= Grønnessegaard =

Manor house and estate in Halsnæs Municipality, Denmark

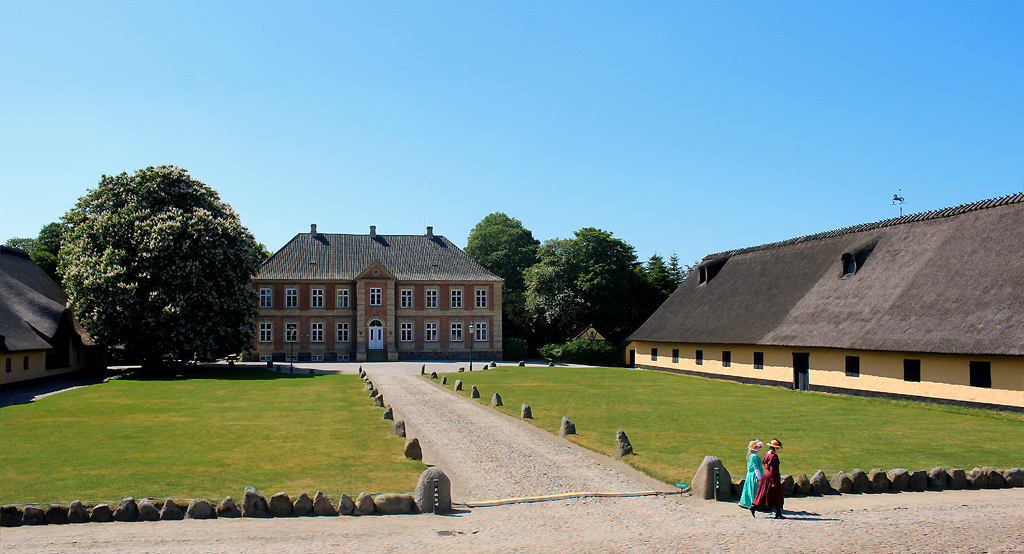
- Interactive map of the Grønnessegaard area

General information
- Architectural style: Neoclassical
- Location: Copenhagen, Denmark
- Coordinates: 55°57′13″N 11°55′20″E
- Completed: 1859

Grønnessegaard is a manor house and estate located just east of Hundested in Halsnæs Municipality, Denmark, some 50 kilometres (31 mi) northwest of Copenhagen. The estate was established by Johan Frederik Classen in 1776. The two-storey main building is from 1859.

== History ==
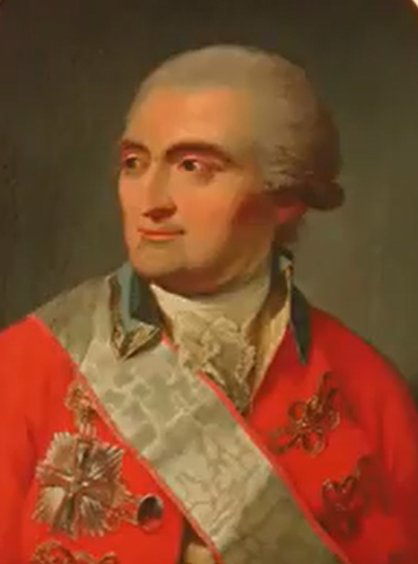
Johan Frederik Classen

Johan Frederik Classen and his partner Just Fabritius had established the nearby Frederick's Works arms factory in 1756. The town of Frederiksværk had formed around the factory. Over the years Classen had also acquired the surrounding land from the crown. He established Arresødal in 1773. In 1776, he also merged the villages of Gryndese, Rorup and Fornerup into another manor named Grønnessegaard. The manors produced food for the workers at his factory and at the same time played an important role as a labour reserve.

Johan Frederik Classen died in 1792. Det Classenske Fideicommis ceded Frederick's Works, Arresødal and Grønnessegaard to Prince Charles of Hesse-Kassel in return for the payment of 7,000 Danish rigsdaler to the foundation. Prince Carl of Hessen-Kassel was married to Princess Louise of Denmark, a sister of Christian VII. He had previously served both as governor of Norway and Slesvig-Holsten. His daughter was married to the future King Frederick VI.

In 1804, Carl of Hessel-Kassel ceded Frederick's Works, Arresødal and Grønnessegaard to Crown Prince Frederick. In 1840, ownership of Grønnessegaard passed from the crown to the government. The copyholds were later converted into freeholds.

The remains of Grønnessegaard were sold to Jørgen and Henrik Jørgen Hellemann, who had already leased the estate for some time, in 1859. From 1879, Henrik Jørgen Hellemann was the sole owner of the estate. In 1897, he sold it to Andreas Chr. Nissen. He was succeeded by his son Andreas Nissen.

In 1921, Nissen's widow sold the estate to Karl Albert Hasselbalch.

== List of owners ==
- (1776-1792) Johan Frederik Classen
- (1792-1804) Prince Charles of Hesse-Kassel
- (1804–1840) The Crown
- (1840–1859) The government
- (1859–1896) Henrik Jørgen Hellemann
- (1859–1879) Jørgen Hellemann
- (1897– ) Andreas Christian Nissen
- ( –1921) Andreas Nissen
- (1921) Andreas Nissen's widow
- (1921–1948) Karl Albert Hasselbalch
- (1948–1967) K.J. Hasselbalch
- (1967–2005) Karsten Hasselbalch
- (2005–present) Ditlev Hasselbalch
