= Listed buildings in Halsnæs Municipality =

This is a list of listed buildings in Halsnæs Municipality, Denmark.

== The list ==
Listing name	Image	Location	Coordinates	Description
Arresødal: Former barracks		Arresødalvej 99A, 3300 Frederiksværk	c. 1800	Former army barracks from c. 1800 situated south of Arresø Canal
Arresødal: Frederick VI's guardhouse		Arresødalvej 65, 3300 Frederiksværk	1705	Former guardhouse
Birkely (4)		Hillerødvej 115, 3300 Frederiksværk	1856	Four-winged farm from 1856 surrounding a courtyard
Grønnessegaard		Amtsvejen 280A, 3390 Hundested		
Hotel Frederiksværk		Torvet 6C, 3300 Frederiksværk	1804	Building from 1804
Melby Church Barn		Tollerupvej 2, 3370 Melby		Barn dating from the Middle Ages associated with Melby Church
Strandgade 12		Strandgade 12, 3300 Frederiksværk	1763	House from 1763
Strandgade 20		Strandgade 20, 3300 Frederiksværk	c. 1770	House from c. 1770
Strandgade 22		Strandgade 22, 3300 Frederiksværk	c. 1770	House from c. 1770
Torvet 1		Torvet 1, 3300 Frederiksværk	c. 1808	House from c. 1808
