= Hesnæs =

- Village
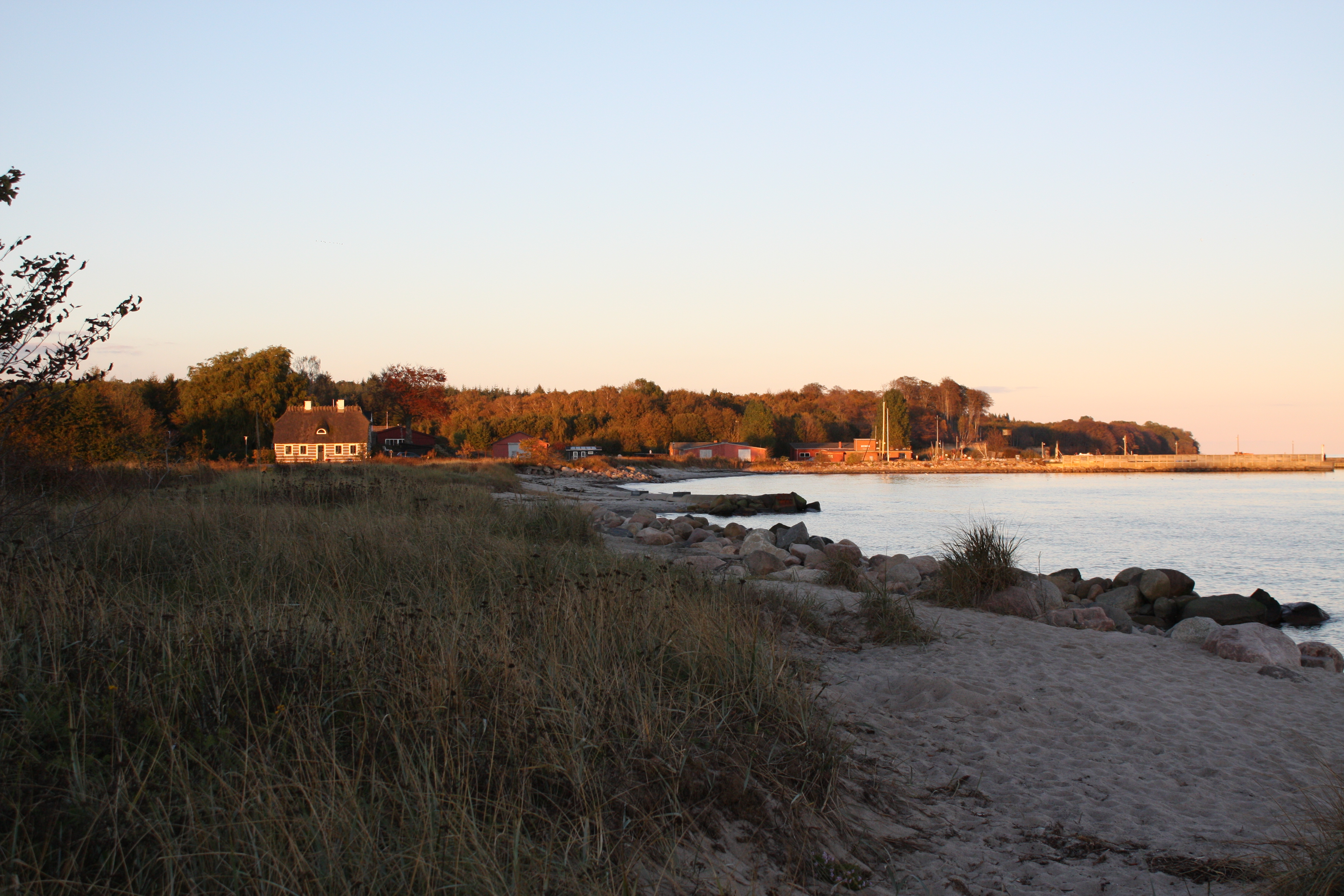
- Hesnæs, Falster

- Location on Falster
- Coordinates: 54°49′27″N 12°08′11″E
- Country: Denmark
- Region: Zealand (Sjælland)
- Municipality: Guldborgsund
- Time zone: UTC+1 (CET)
  - Summer (DST): UTC+2 (CEST)

Hesnæs is a little fishing village located 12 kilometres (7.5 mi) southeast of Stubbekøbing on the Danish island of Falster. Its distance from Copenhagen is 125.4 km. It is best known for its thatched, straw-clad houses, not found elsewhere in Denmark.

== History ==
The first documented reference to Hesnæs (then Hesnes) dates from 1551 when it is mentioned as a fishing village. In 1585, the Crown acquired Hesnæs from Peter Gyldenstjerne of Bønnet. It had 11 fishing huts and five net-making stalls.

In 1771, it was bought by Johan Frederik Classen of Corselitze, founder of Det Classenske Fideicommis.

In 1801, Hesnæs was a small herring fishing community consisting of 18 families in clay-plastered, whitewashed houses set out in rows beside the shore with gardens in the rear. There were fields along the stream known as Hesnæas Bæk. In 1806, Hesnæs was mentioned as the most important fishing community on Falster. In 1801, Classen also constructed a chief forester's house (skovridergård) known as Petersminde in the forest just east of Hesnæs. The estate covered 25 tønder land.

In the 19th century, the layout was upset as lots were sold along what is now Hesnæsvej, including the old gardens. As the population diminished, the empty houses were torn down for replanning. In 1872, the Baltic flood destroyed most of the village.

After the floods, it was decided to rebuild new houses higher up in the village. The architect Vilhelm Tvede (1826–1891) developed a new design, unique in Denmark, for the fishermen's houses, known today as "Hesnæs houses", with half-timbered, straw-clad walls, thatched roofs and horizontal-containing struts along the facade. Their carved window and door frames are also characteristic. After Tvede's death, it was his son, Gotfred Tvede, who completed the work on behalf of Det Classenske Fideicommis, the foundation set up by Classen. It was also Gotfred who gave the houses a straw lining to protect the half-timbered stone walls from the wind and wet sea mist. The houses were built with living quarters at one end and a stall at the other end.

The harbour came in 1878 with a growing need to ship locally-produced timber. The harbour master's house was built on the south side of the village. Exploitation of the surrounding Corselitz forest led to the opening of a sawmill in 1901 which operated until the mid-1980s, at times employing up to 25 workmen. An impressive new house for the manager of the sawmill, designed by Gotfred Tvede, followed. Later, fishing again became the main occupation for the village although it was not as successful as it had been in former times. In 1963, a small company "Hesnæs Fisk" was established with a filetting factory and a retail outlet for fresh fish but it closed again in 2008.

== Hesnæs today ==
The harbour is still used by a few small fishing boats but is mainly a venue for pleasure craft during the summer months. Plans have been drawn up to preserve the village and ensure its careful development but have not yet been implemented. Some 1,500 metres (4,900 ft) to the south of Hesnæs lies Pomle Nakke Traktørsted where a high mound along the shore provides views of the island of Møn. The mound was left by the melting ice some 12,000 years ago at the end of the last ice age. There is a little restaurant there, open in the summer months.

== Gallery ==
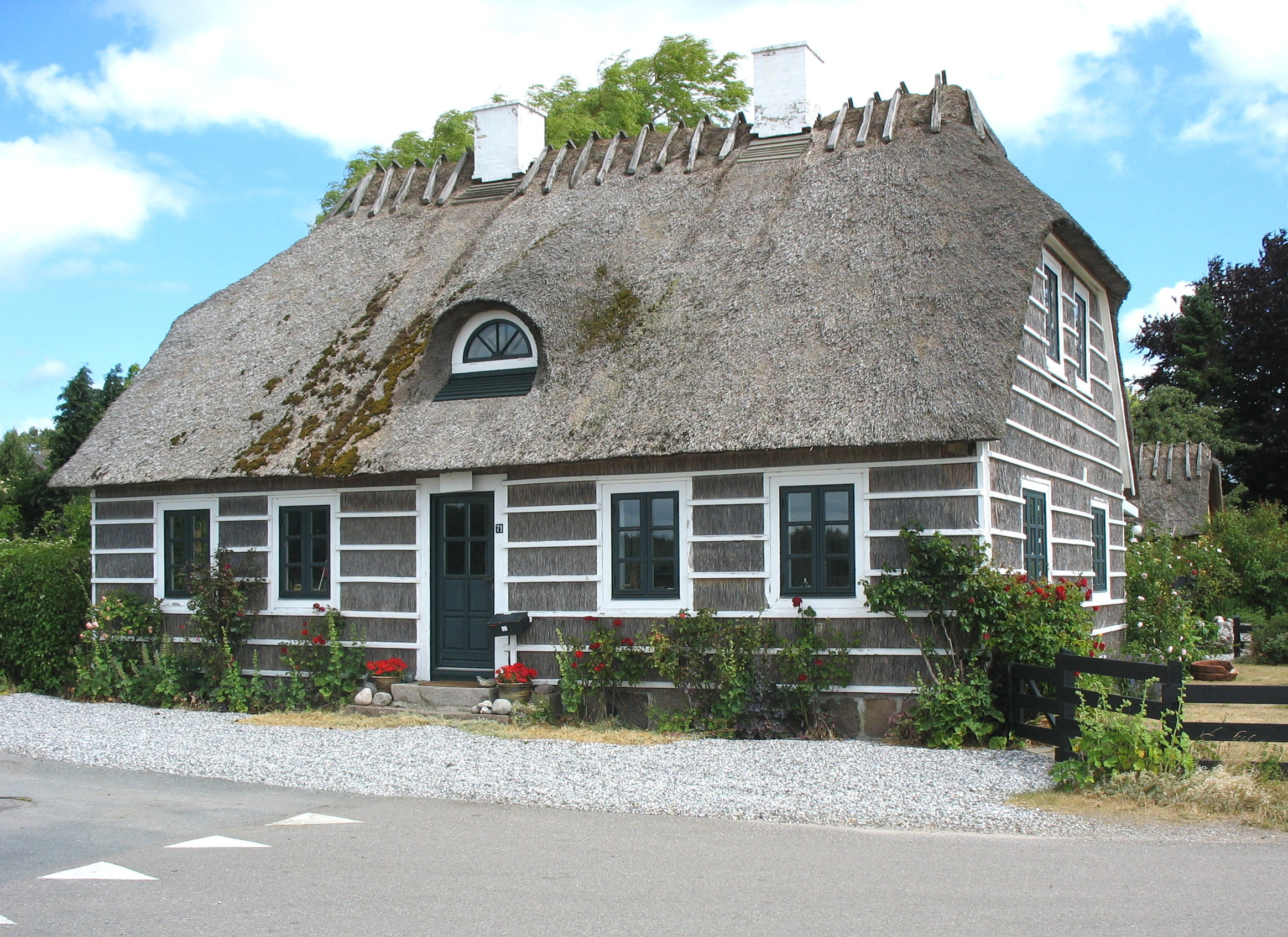
A "Hesnæas house"

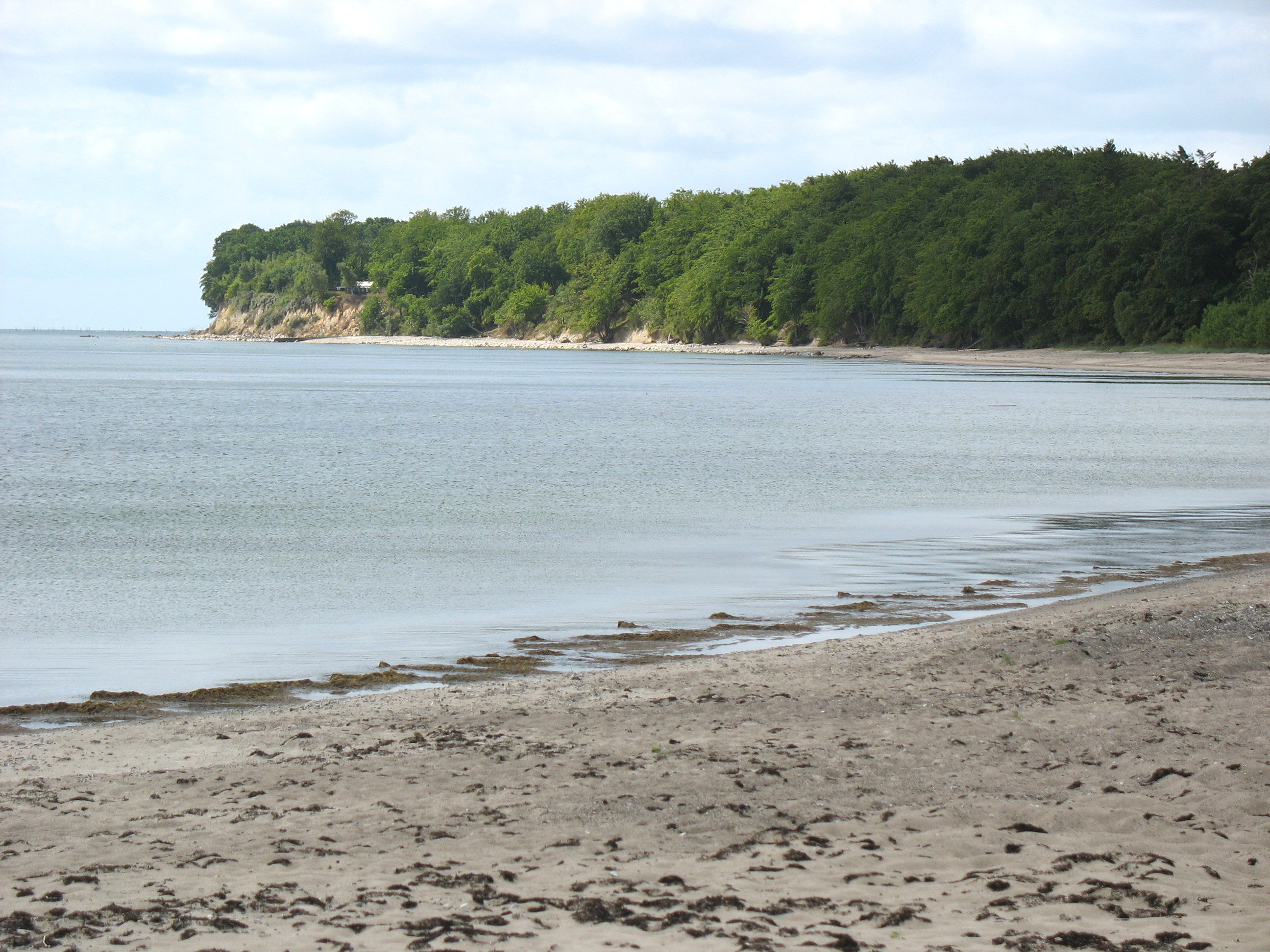
Hesnæs: view to the south
