= Corselitze Forest =

Forest on the Danish island of Falster

Corselitze Forest Corselitze Skov
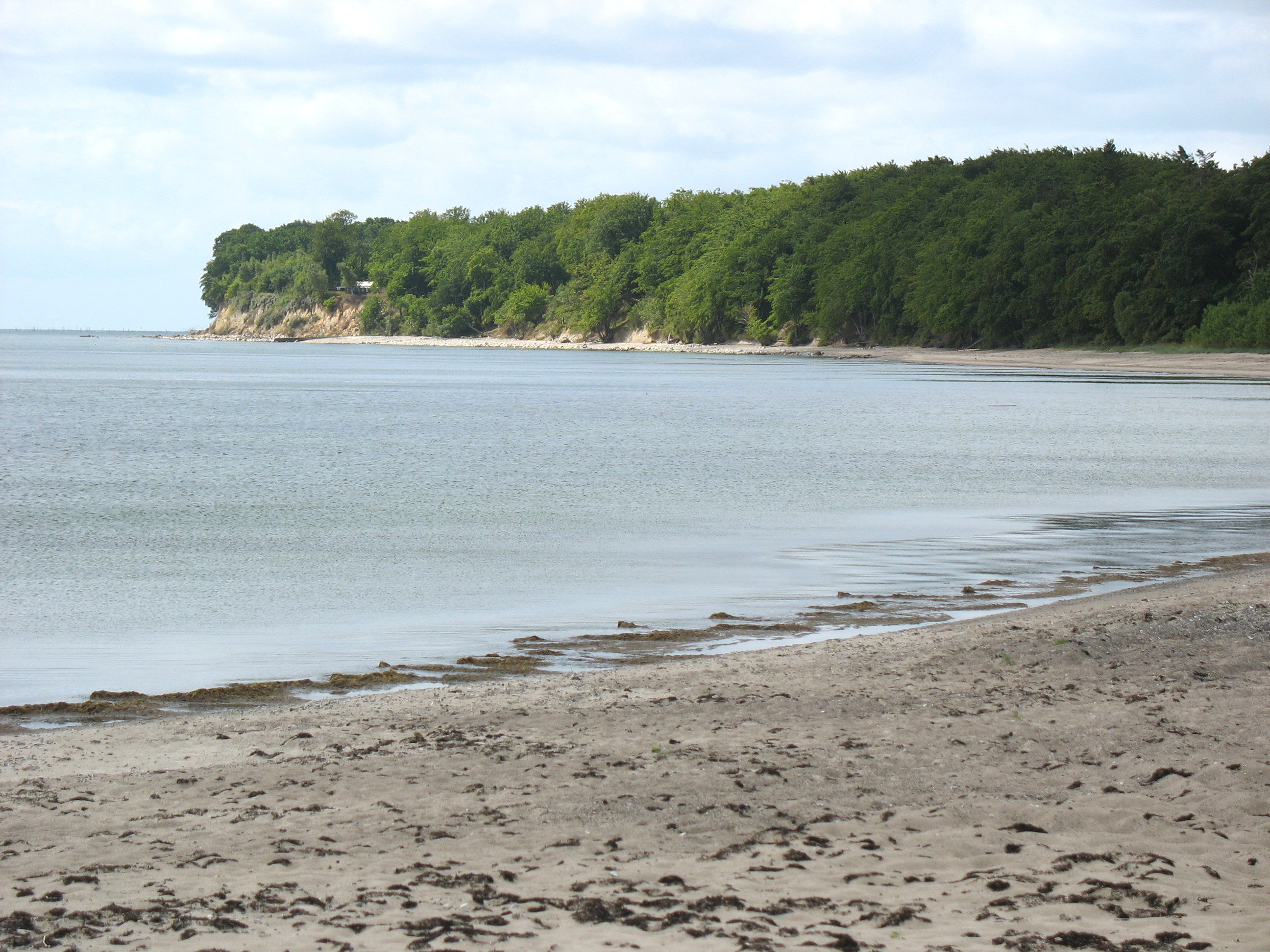
- View of the Corselitz Forest from Hesnæs

- Location within Denmark
- Interactive map of Corselitze Forest

Geography
- Location: Island of Falster, Denmark
- Coordinates: 54°51′00″N 12°08′00″E
- Area: 1,743 ha (4,310 acres)

Administration
- Authority: Det Classenske Fideicommis

Ecology
- WWF Classification: Baltic mixed forests

Corselitze Forest (alternate, Corselitz; Danish: Corselitze skov) is located on the Danish island of Falster. Situated in the northeast of the island, it contains white pine plantations, although beech is the most common tree species.

== History ==
The forest, a manor house also named Corselitze, a summerhouse, an extensive garden, farmland, and additional surrounding forests were developed by Major general Johan Frederik Classen, a successful businessman who made his fortune running a number of companies in Frederiksværk in the north of Zealand. He had acquired the Corselitze estate from the Crown in 1768. When he died in 1792, he left all his possessions to a charitable foundation known as Det Classenske Fideicommis which continues to manage the forest today.

== The forest ==
The forest covers an area of 1,743 hectares (4,310 acres) and consists mainly of deciduous trees including beech and oak although there are also some conifers. It is typical of eastern Denmark with beech the most important type of tree. Oak occupies areas of predominantly clay soil and areas which tend to be marshy. All the principal deciduous trees (beech, oak, ash, sycamore) grow well and are allowed to mature over long periods, up to 110 years for beech. European spruce fills some 20% of the forest, sometimes mixed with Douglas-fir and grand fir. In recent years, felling has produced 8,000–10,000 cubic metres (280,000–350,000 cu ft) per year.

== Access ==
As a result of its location along the coast and its paths, the forest attracts many visitors. It is open all year round to pedestrians and cyclists. Riding is permitted on the specially signposted trails for those who have purchased a riding permit from Riderute Lolland-Falster.
