= Vilhelm Tvede =

Danish architect (1826–1891)

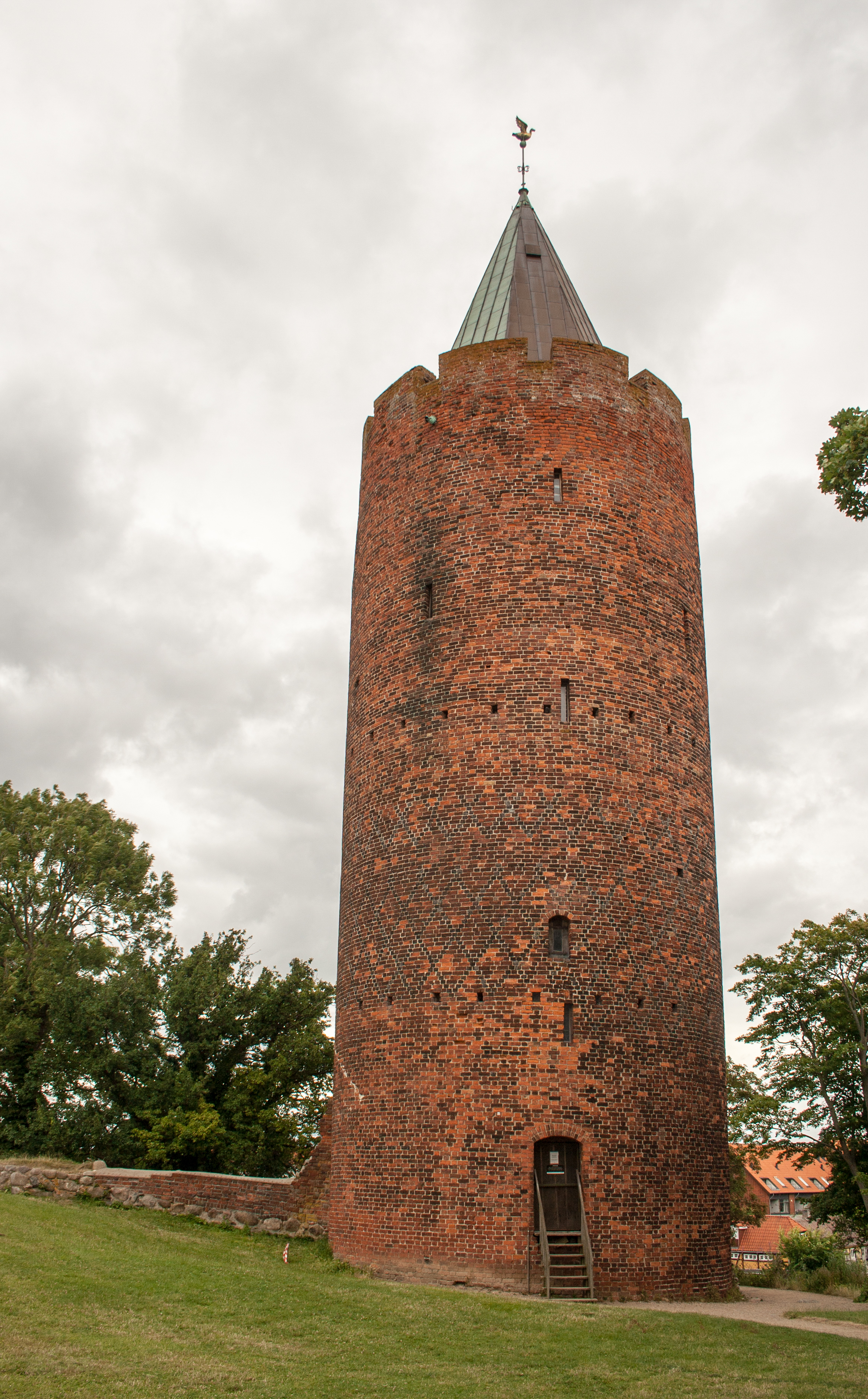
Gåsetårnet at Vordingborg Castle

Frederik Vilhelm Tvede (13 May 1826 – 27 November 1891) was a Danish architect.

== Biography ==
Tvede was born in the parish of Trinitatis in Copenhagen, Denmark. He was the son of Johan Frederik Tvede and Christine f. Norup.

He was a student of Gustav Friedrich Hetsch at the Royal Danish Academy of Fine Arts. He was employed as a drawing teacher at the Technical Institute (Teknologisk Institut) and worked for Det Classenske Fideicommis. His son, Gotfred Tvede was also an architect associated with Det Classenske Fideicommis.

Among other projects, Tvede led the restoration of the Church of Our Lady (Vor Frue Kirke) at Kalundborg (1867-1871) as well as Goose Tower (Gåsetårnet) at Vordingborg Castle (1871). He designed Humlebæk Church (1868) and Vedbæk Church (1870-1871). He was also responsible for the first architect-designed fisherman's cottage in Denmark in the village of Hesnæs; the roofing was later changed by his son in 1919.

== Personal life ==
In 1857, he married Marie Ostermann. He was the father of architect Gotfred Tvede (1863-1947). In 1871 he became Knight of the Order of Dannebrog. He died during 1891 and was buried at Assistens Cemetery in Copenhagen.

== Gallery ==
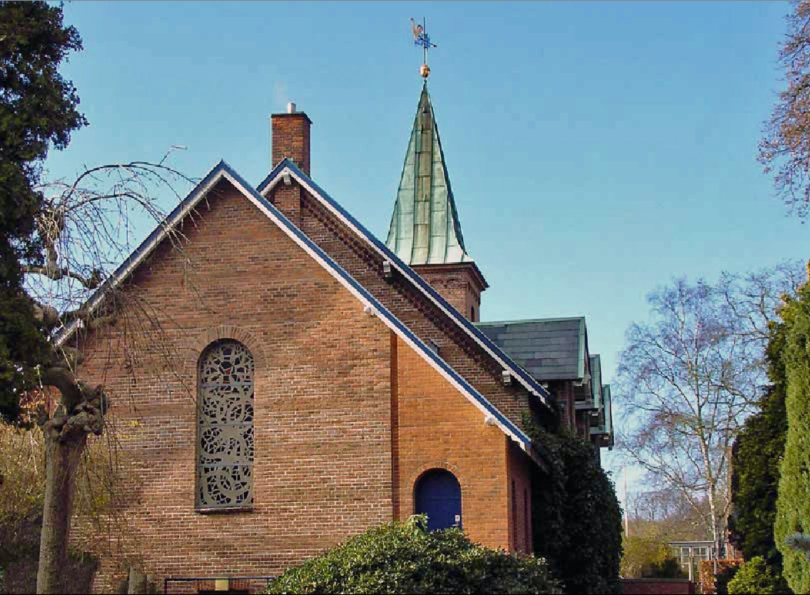
Humlebæk church (Fredensborg)

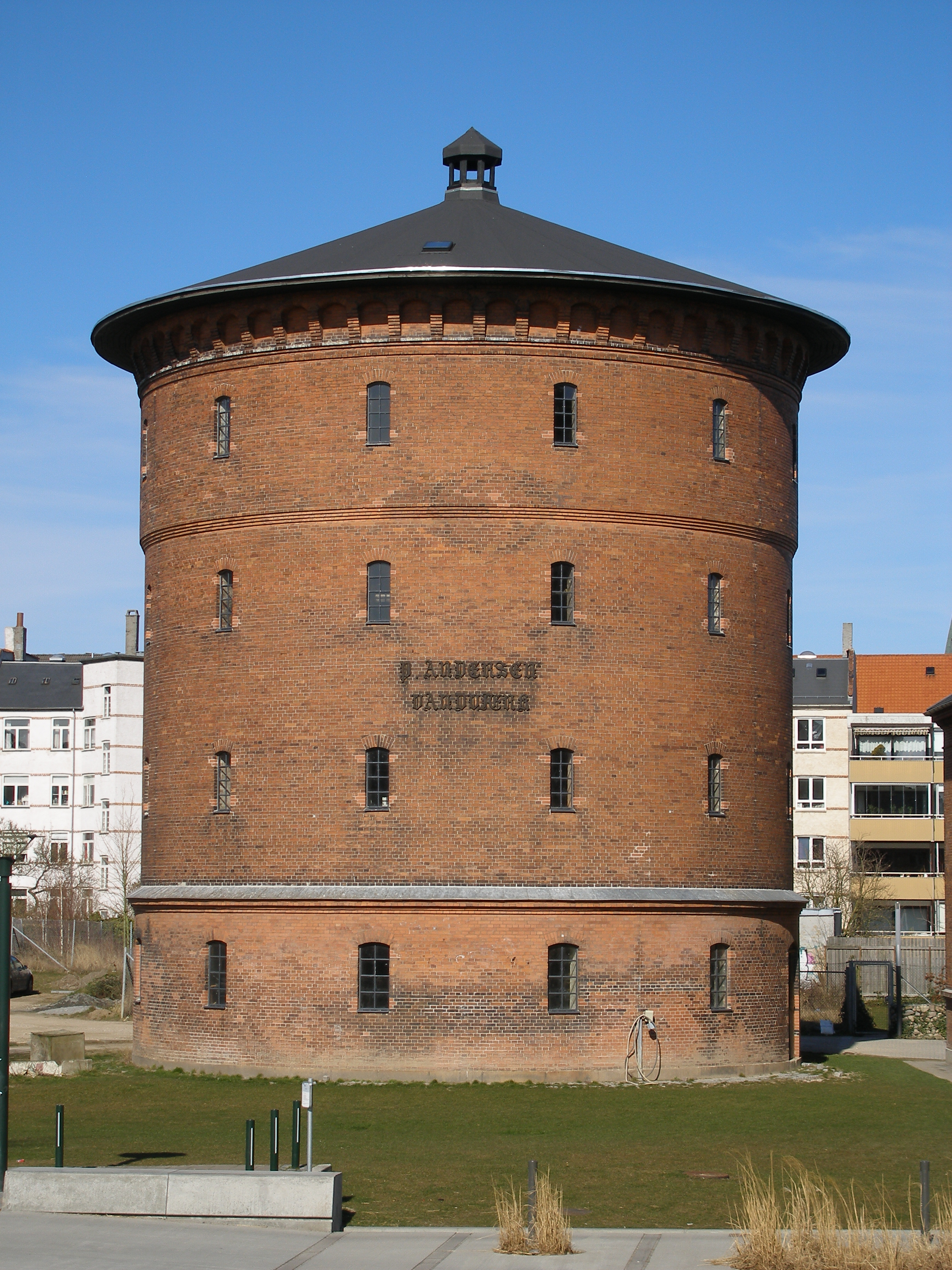
Andersen's Water Tower, (Frederiksberg)

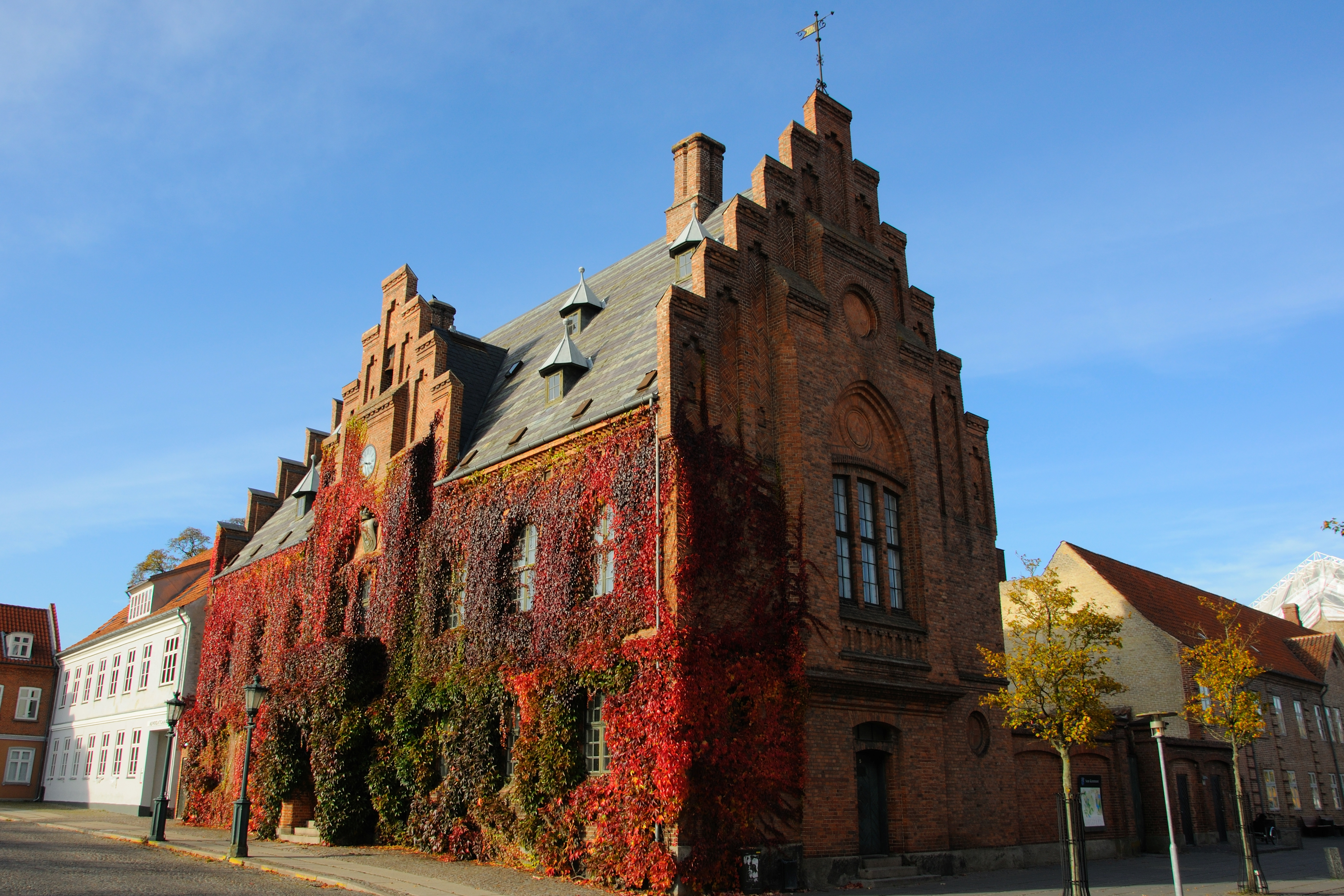
Old Police Station (Sorø)

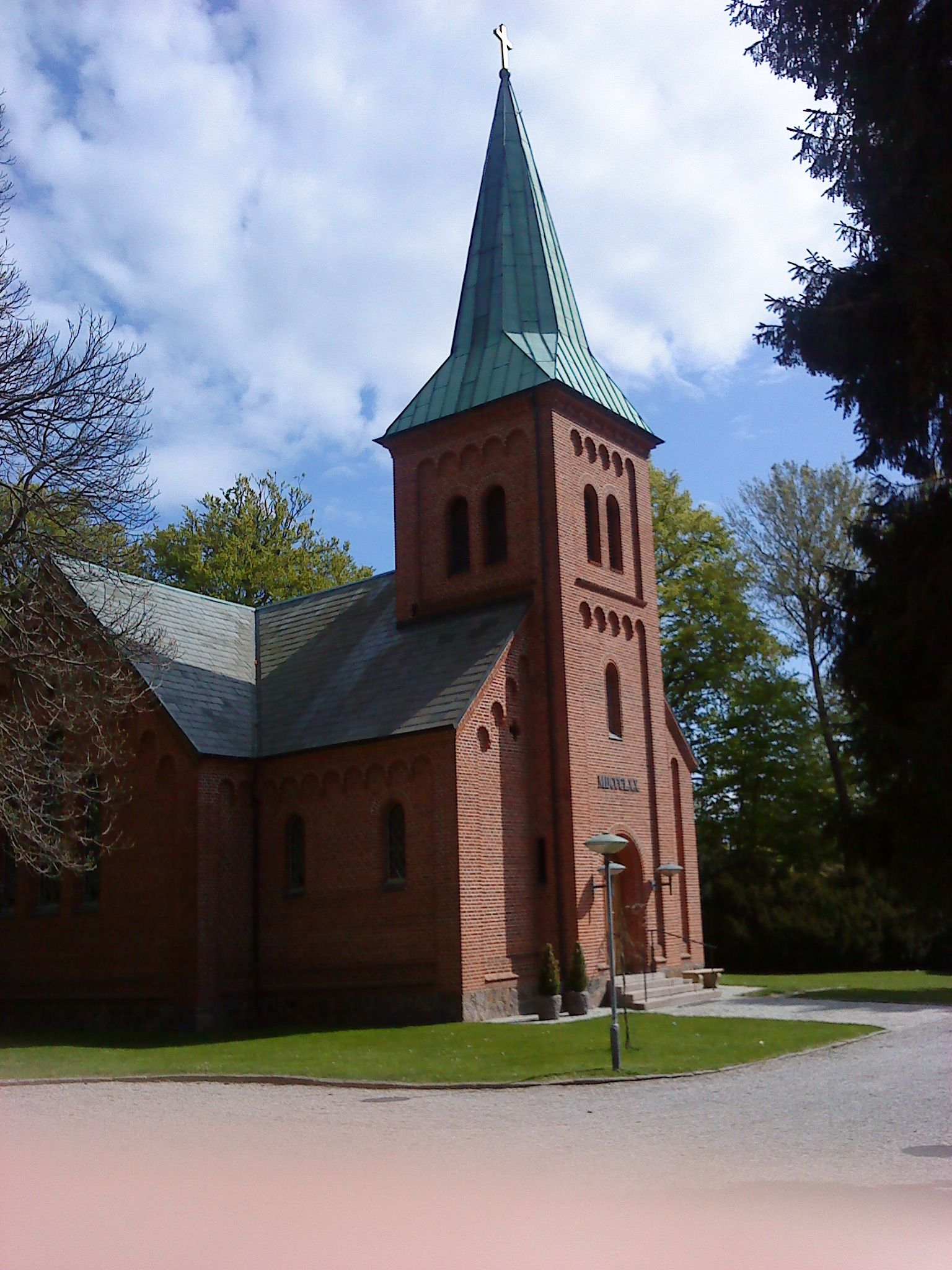
Vedbæk Church (Copenhagen)
