= Classen Library =

Library building in Copenhagen, Denmark

- Det Classenske Bibliotek
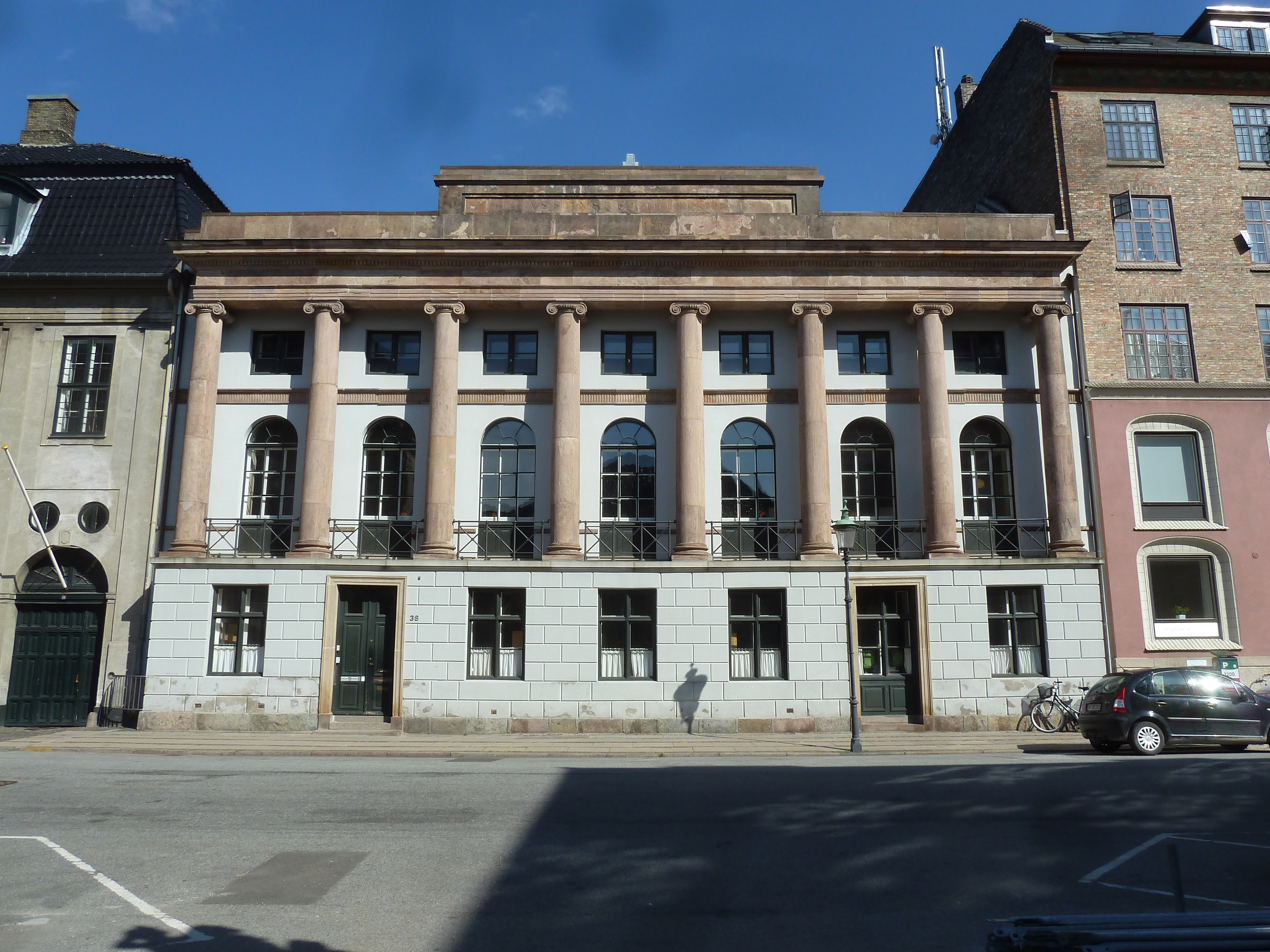
- The façade on Amaliegade =
- Interactive map of the Classen Library area

General information
- Architectural style: Neoclassical
- Location: Denmark
- Coordinates: 55°41′09.6″N 12°35′42.36″E
- Completed: 1802

Design and construction
- Architect: Peter Hersleb Classen/Andreas Kirkerup

The Classen Library (Danish: Det Classenske Bibliotek) was a public library in Copenhagen, Denmark. It was created from the private book collection of Johan Frederik Classen, at the time of his death in 1792. It was the third largest library in the city, surpassed only by the Royal Danish Library and Copenhagen University Library and existed until 1867 when it was merged with the latter.

Its building at 38 Amaliegade now houses Det Konserveringsfaglige Videncenter, a centre for conservation. It was listed in 1918.

== History ==
=== Site history ===
The site was formerly part of the vast Sophie Amalienborg garden. Rgus karge property was listed in Copenhagen's new cadastre of 1756 as No. 61 in St. Ann's East Quarter. The property known as Amaliegade 38 was later referred to as No. 71 B. It was marked as No. 1340 on Christian Gedde's 1756 map of St. Ann's East Quarter.

=== Classen ===
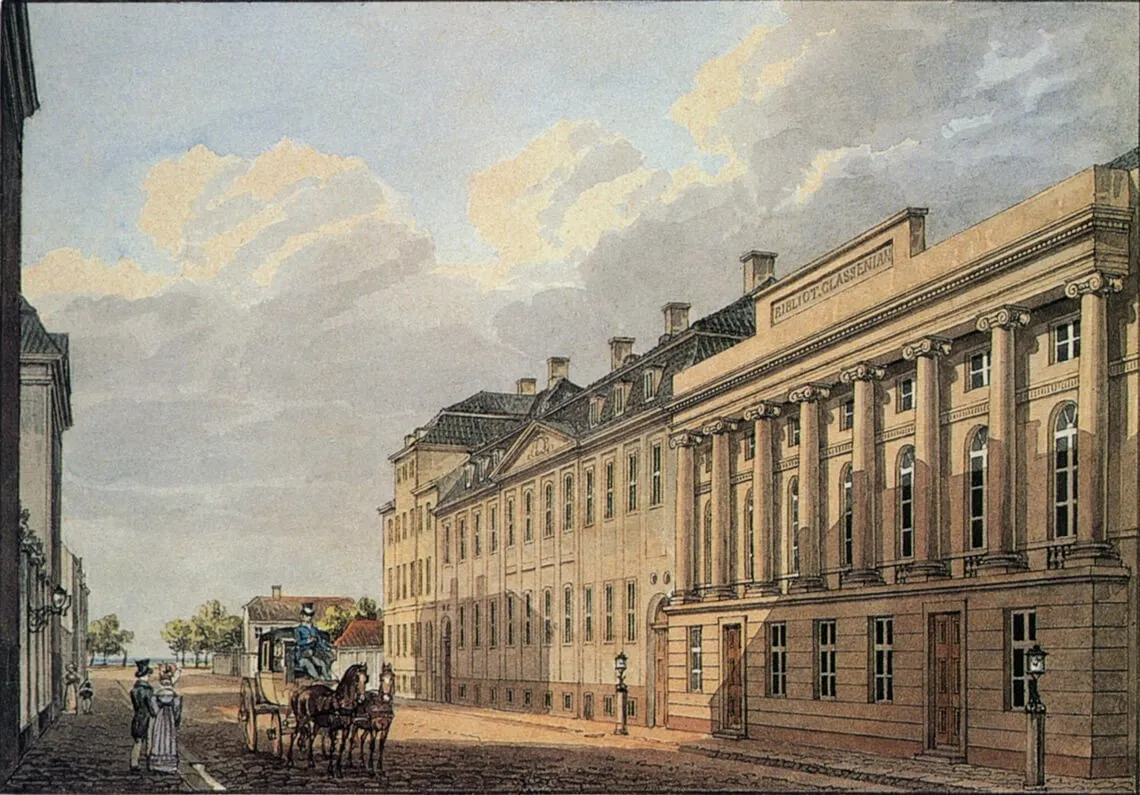
The library seen on a painting from the middle of the 19th century.

The successful industrialist and landowner Johan Frederik Classen was an enthusiastic bibliophile, buying books both at home and abroad, until he had a library. At the time of his death, he left his book collection to the public. It consisted of some 20,000 volumes. The library was to receive an annual sum of 3,000 rigsdaler from the Classenske Fideicommis, a charitable foundation which he set up in his will. Classen's brother, Peter Hersleb Classen, paid for the construction of a library building in Amaliegade, opposite Frederick's Hospital and not far from Amalienborg Palace. The library's collections grew to about 30,000 volumes in the middle of the 19th century.

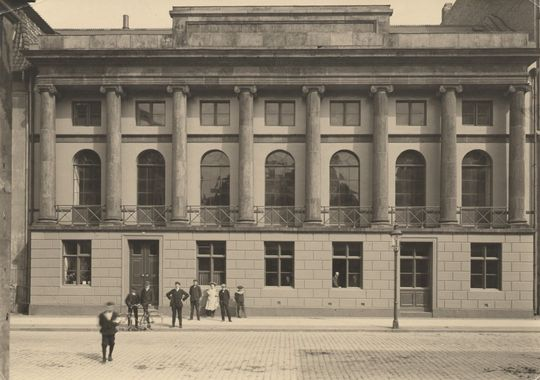
The building of the then closed Classen Library photographed in about 1900

In 1867 the library was merged with Copenhagen University Library which changed its name to Københavns Universitetsbibliotek og det dermed forenede Classenske Bibliotek.

== Architecture ==
The library was built to Peter Hersleb Classen's own design, presumably assisted by Andreas Kirkerup. The facade has rustication on the ground floor and a loggia with eight columns, showing influence from Ancient Roman architecture. The central library hall is two storeys high and surrounded by double galleries. It contains a bust of Classen.

== Today ==
Today the building houses Konserveringsfagligt Videncenter (KViC), the library of the Royal Danish Academy of Fine Arts' School of Conservation.

== See also ==
- Den Classenske Legatskole
- List of libraries in Denmark
