= Generalens Lysthus =

Danish cottage

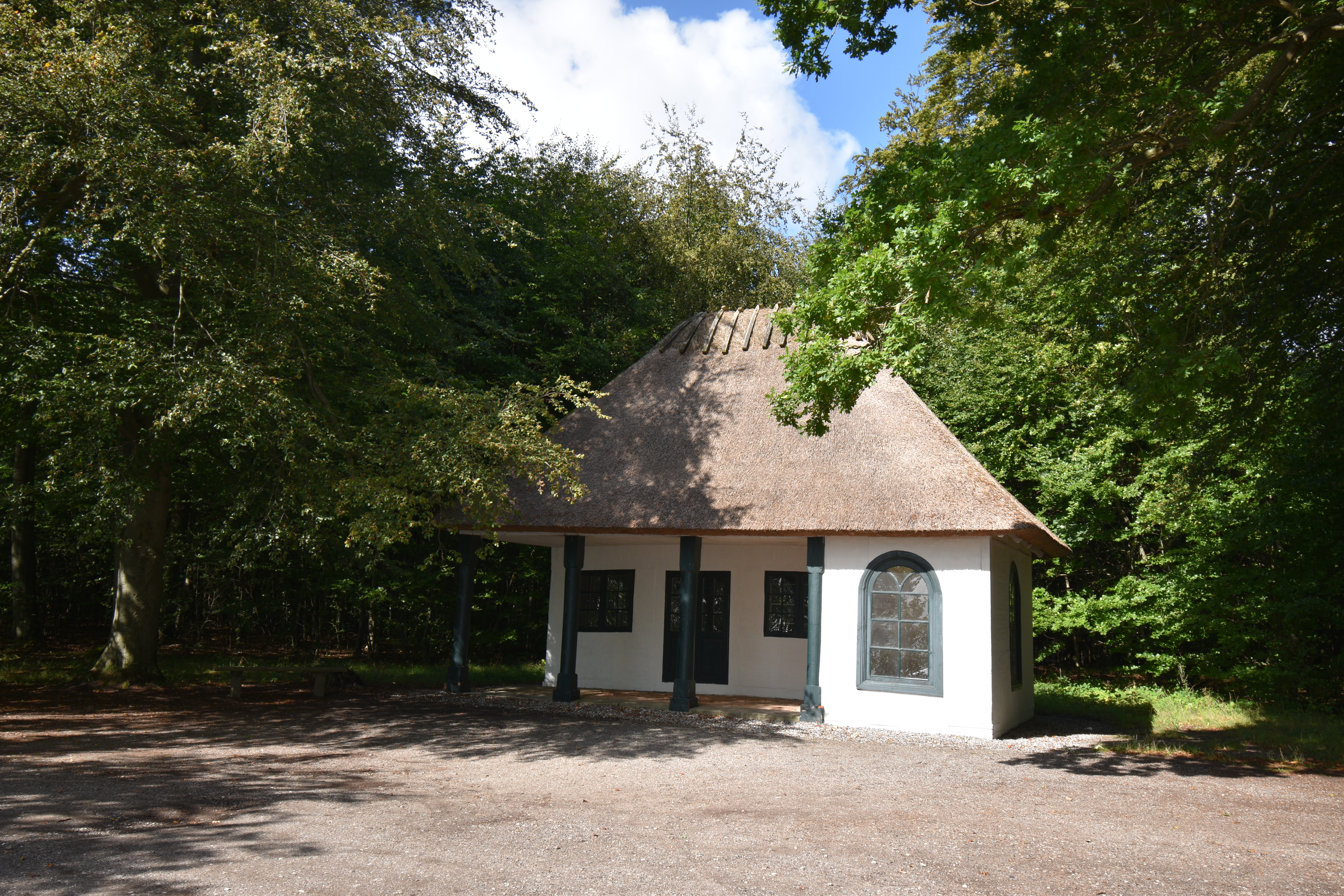
- Interactive map of the Generalens Lysthus area

General information
- Location: Tromnæs Forest, Falster, Denmark
- Coordinates: 54°45′40″N 12°2′42″E
- Completed: 1786

Generalens Lysthus (the General's Summer House) is a small, thatched cottage in Tromnæs Forest on the Danish island of Falster. It was built in 1786 by the industrialist Johan Frederik Classen who also built nearby Corselitze.

== Architecture ==
The house is located near the sea at the end of the road from Corselitze manor which lies to the west. It bears a close resemblance to the larger thatched country home at Liselund on the island of Møn. Designed by Andreas Kirkerup and completed in 1786 in the Neoclassical style, the one-storey, half-timbered whitewashed building has a covered veranda and a living room. The hipped thatched roof has wooden thatching supports along the ridge. In addition to the cottages's small-paned casement windows on all sides, the veranda has larger round-arched windows while the tops of the double doors are also glazed. As a result, the interior has a pleasantly bright look. The windows, doors and woodwork are painted green. The veranda is supported by four round wooden columns in front of the living room with a lateral section outside the half-timbering. The ceiling consists of white-painted boards while the floor is of red and yellow hexagonal tiles. The cottage looks out over the Baltic Sea.

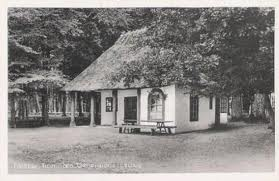
Generalens Lysthus, Tromnæs, Falster (old photograph)

The Rococo interior consists of a large rectangular room with a domed ceiling fringed with garlands and medallions. The centre of the ceiling is decorated with a rosette and a floral wreath. An inscription on the door reads: "Wer Ruhe hat Der findt sie her" (he who has peace finds it here). The walls are panelled and a cupboard stands in one corner. The window sills are fitted with iron bars.

The building was listed in 1918.

== See also ==
- Corselitze
- Johan Frederik Classen
