= Corselitze =

Manor house in Denmark

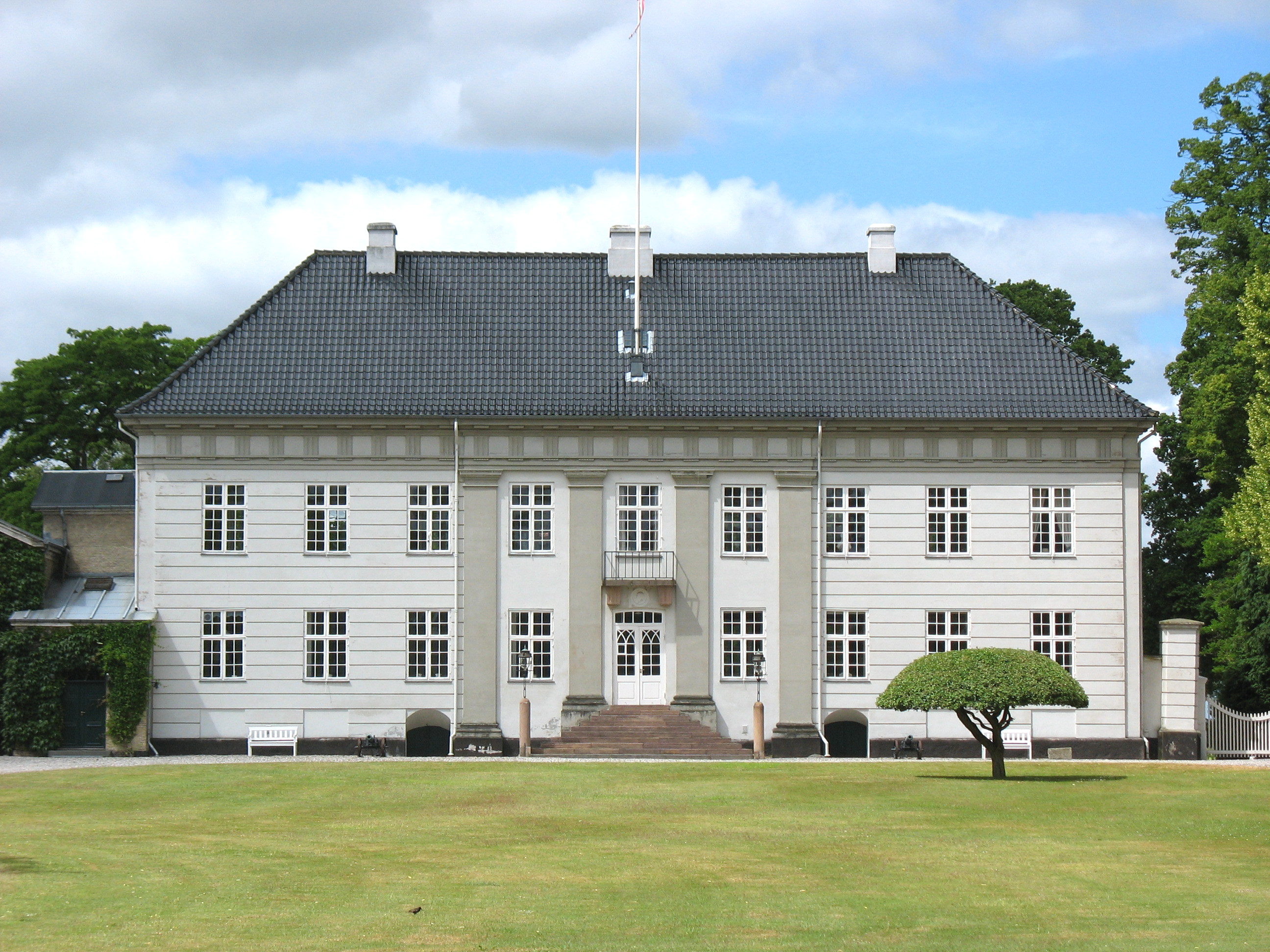
- Corselitze Manor House, Falster
- Interactive map of the Corselitze area

General information
- Architectural style: Neoclassical
- Location: Guldborgsund Municipality, Denmark
- Coordinates: 54°46′3″N 12°1′15″E
- Construction started: 1775
- Completed: 1777
- Client: Johan Frederik Classen

Design and construction
- Architect: Andreas Kirkerup

Corselitze, or Korselitse, is a manor house on the island of Falster in the south-east of Denmark. The Neoclassical house was built in 1777 by Johan Frederik Classen, who at the time of his death founded Det Classenske Fideicommis, which owns the estate today.

== History ==
=== Early history ===
Corselitze derives from Wendish and means 'settlement of Chotel's heirs'. The estate shares much of its early history with the island of Falster. Like most of the island, it belonged to the Crown in the 13th century and is mentioned in King Valdemar II's Danish Census Book which dates from about 1231. In 1354 Corselitze was acquired by Jens Falster, a member of the local nobility, and it remained in the possession of his family until 1600 when it was sold to Axel Brahe.

A few years later, in 1603, it was reacquired by the Crown in exchange for Eskebjerg on Funen. Between 1560 and 1650 the entire island of Falster once again came under the Crown through such transactions.

Initially it was used as a livgeding, a Danish term for land put at the disposal of the dowager queen for her support (a dower estate), but in 1718 it was converted into a cavalry district.

=== Classen and his trust ===
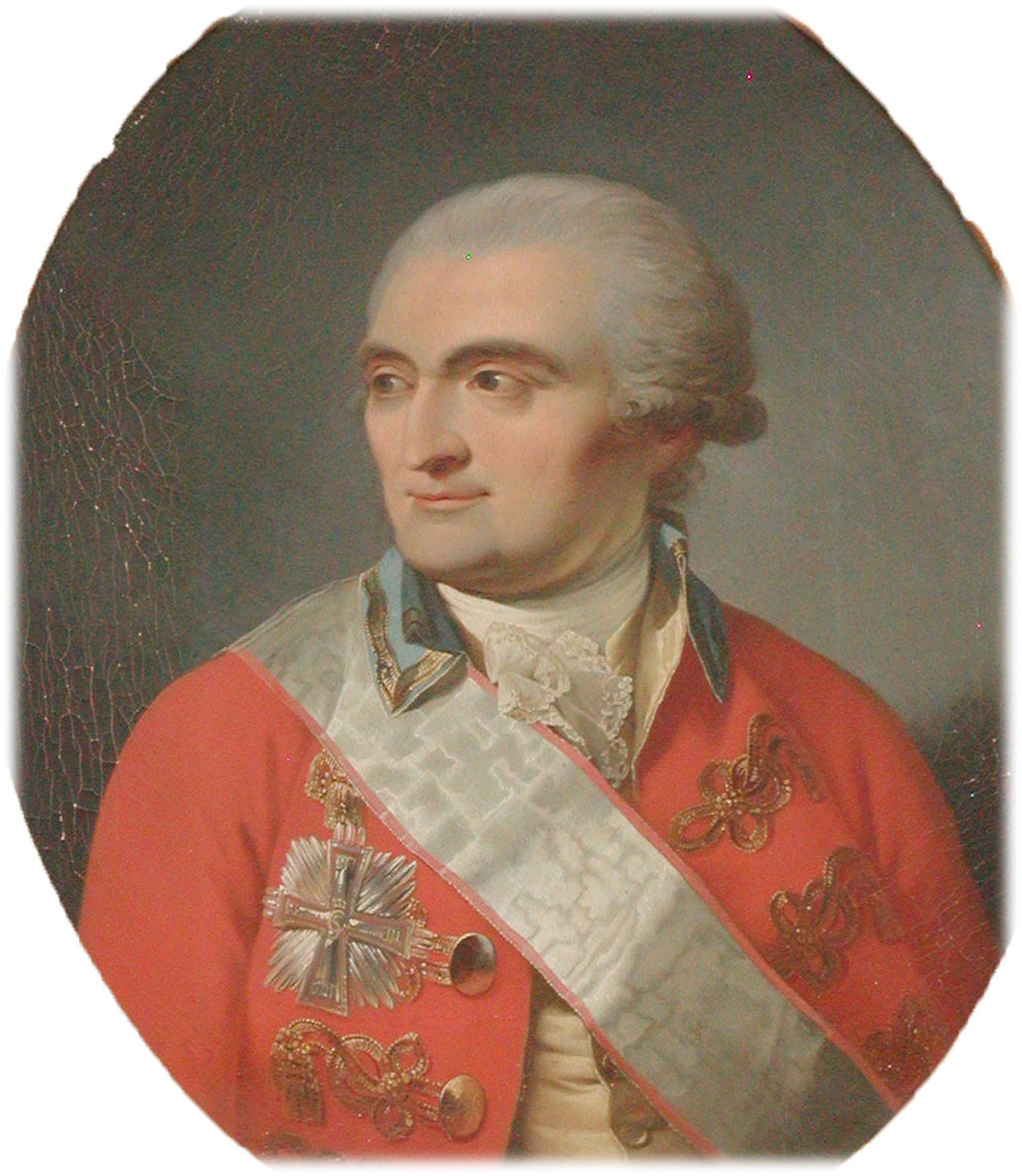
Johan Frederik Classen

The cavalry district was dissolved in 1766 and split up into ten manors which were sold by auction. Prince Charles of Hesse-Kassel bought Corselitze and nearby Carlsfelt, probably acting as a straw man for his friend and colleague Major General Johan Frederik Classen who took over the properties two years later. Classen was a wealthy industrialist with close ties to the king and the political elite. He had just reacquired Frederiksværk, a foundry in the north of Zealand, which he had co-founded and then sold to the king in 1761.

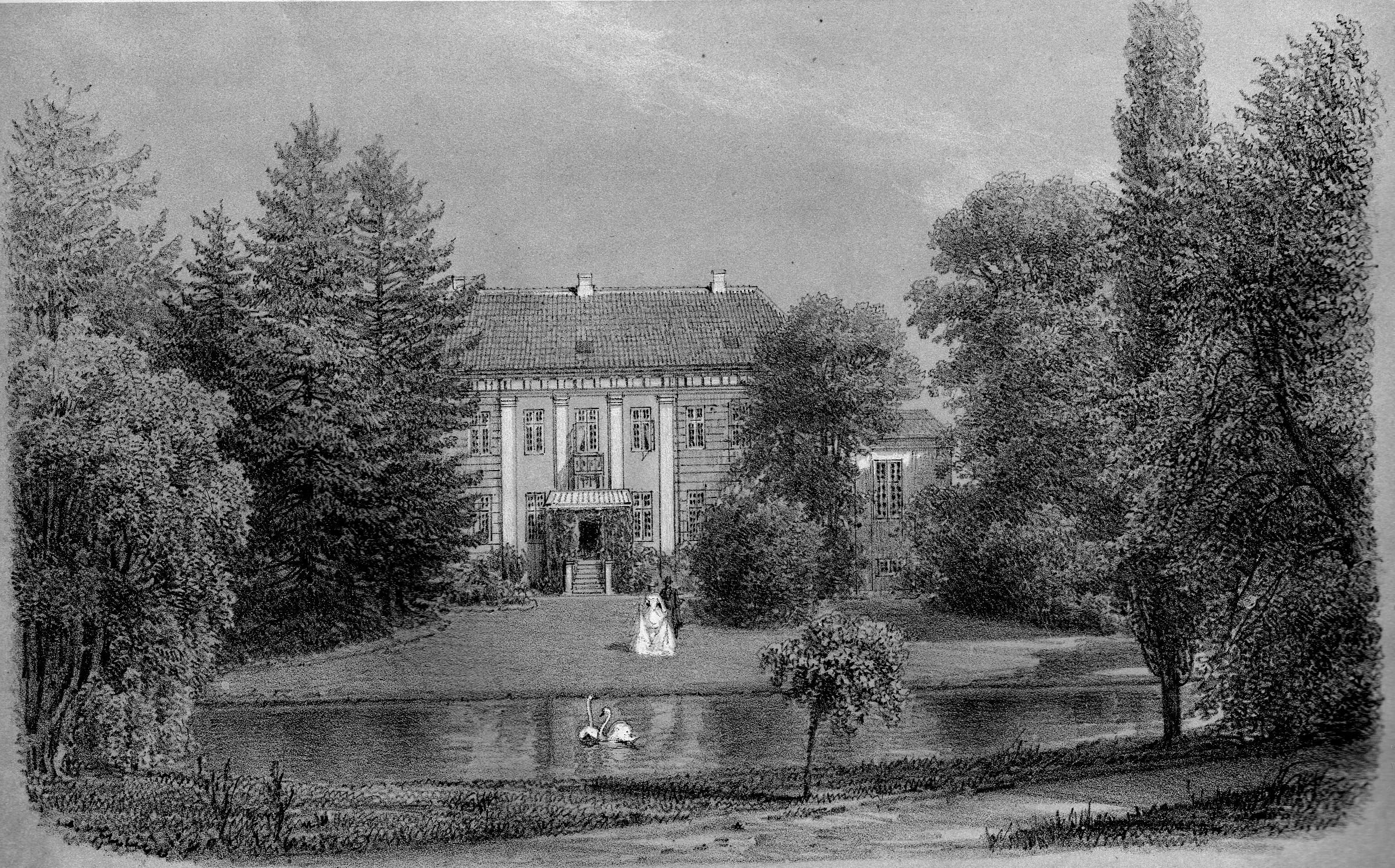
Corselitze in 1867

After Classen's death in 1792 the property, along with the rest of his estate, was passed on to Det Classenske Fideicommis, a philanthropic trust which he created and still owns today. In 1947 the trust also acquired Fuglsang and Priorskov on the neighbouring island of Lolland.

== Architecture ==
The Corselitze seen today was built by Classen from 1775 to 1777 to the design of the architect Andreas Kirkerup. It is an adaption of the old house which dated from the 17th century. Built in the Neoclassical style, it consists of two floors under a black tile roof. The front is nine bays long and decorated with pilasters. The fine interiors with decorations by the sculptor Johannes Wiedewelt have partly been preserved.

== Surroundings ==
Classen also founded an English-style landscape garden with orchards, a nursery and tree-lined avenues which has partly been preserved. At the edge of Corselitze Forest towards the sea, Classen also built the General's summerhouse (Danish: Generalens Lysthus), a thatched cottage which is a miniature version of Liselund on the island of Møn. The site also includes a farm which was designed by Vilhelm Tvede and built in 1866.

Near the mansion lies the small fishing village of Hesnæs. It is notable for its characteristic reed-clad houses which were built after the 1872 Baltic Sea flood. The harbour is home to a small fleet of fishing vessels and is popular with leisure boats throughout the summer.

== Corselitze today ==
The estate covers 2,792 hectares with Næsgård, Bjerregård, Bellinge and Herslebslund. Of these, 645 hectares are farm land. With Fuglsang and Priorskov on Lolland, its holdings in the area amount to 2,600 hectares of forest and 1,700 hectares of farmland. Since 1999, the farmland has been managed directly by Det Classenske Fideicommis after previously having been leased.

== Owners ==
- (1231–1354) The Crown
- (1354–1421) Jens Falster
- (1421–1460) Laurids Falster
- (1460–1500) Peder Falster
- (1500–1529) Oluf Falster
- (1529–1556) Peder Falster
- (1556–1600) Jens Falster
- (1600–1603) Axel Brahe
- (1603–1766) The Crown
- (1766–1792) Johan Frederik Classen
- (1792–) Det Classenske Fideicommis

== See also ==
- Valnæsgård
