= Asserbo Charterhouse =

Coordinates: 56°1′26″N 12°3′10″E

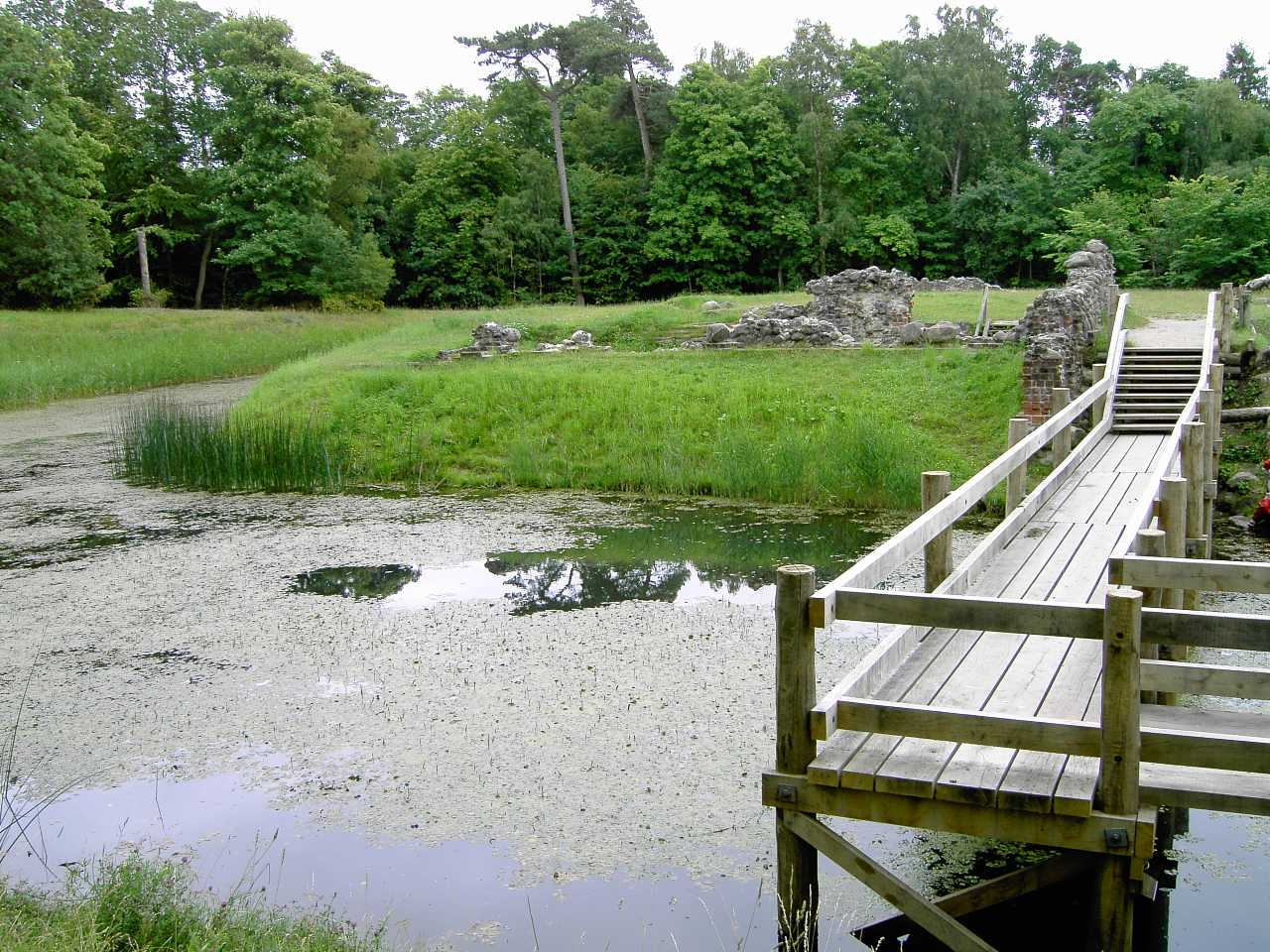
Access to the ruins of Asserbo Charterhouse, across the moat.

Asserbo Charterhouse is a fortress and Carthusian monastery ruin in the small town of Asserbo north of Frederiksværk on North Zealand in Denmark.

The monastery was founded by Bishop Absalon in the later part of the 12th century and functioned as a short-lived Carthusian monastery. It later came under Sorø Abbey and parts of it under Esrum Abbey and remained so until the end of the Middle Ages. In that period the buildings were used as a farmhouse or small manor and administered as a so-called Grangier (farmhouse and nearby buildings) by the monks of Sorø Abbey. Originally it comprised a main building, a tower with a cellar, various cellars and some half-timbered houses. The buildings were founded on a structure of large bricks, known as monk bricks. The site was surrounded by an embankment and access was only possible by a drawbridge from the north side. By 1248, as is known from written sources, Asserbo Chartehouse had developed into a small village, the village now known as Asserbo.

From the 15th century Asserbo charterhouse was leased to various noble families, until Steward of the Realm Poul Laxmand took ownership in 1490. From then on, the ownership shifted between The Crown and various noble families until the start of the 18th century, when it was left to the devastating drifting sands of the time.

The drifting sands and dunes were eventually stopped in the 1730s and covered by the plantation of Tisvilde Hegn (English: Tisvilde Fence). The charterhouse was dug free in 1849 and the embankments were restored in 1972.

== The Carthusian charterhouse ==
While Eskil, archbishop of Lund, was in exile in France he came into contact in 1156 with the Carthusians, either at the Grande Chartreuse or at Mont-Dieu Charterhouse, and was inspired to attempt a Carthusian foundation in Denmark.

Asserbo Charterhouse, in his diocese, was the result, and appears to have been founded in 1163, although there is evidence of a Carthusian presence there from 1162. The site however proved unsuitable, and the monastery was abandoned in 1169.

== Sources ==
- Aigner, Thomas, 2004: Monasticon cartusiense, vol. 2 (eds. Gerhard Schlegel and James Hogg). Analecta cartusiana, n° 185.2. Salzburg: Institut für Anglistik und Amerikanistik (in German)
- Asserbo Danish Nature Agency (in Danish)
- Asserbo Castle-ruin - ruins from the 11th century Frederiksværk Guide (in Danish)
- A failed monastery foundation Gyldendals' Open Encyclopedia (in Danish)
- Asserbo - Absalon's gift swallowed by sand 1001 stories of Denmark. Danish Agency for Culture.
