= Arresødal =

Manor estate in northeastern Denmark

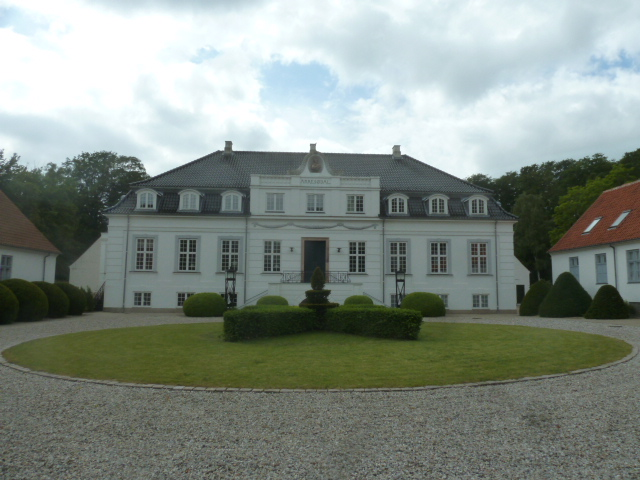
- Interactive map of the Arresødal area

General information
- Architectural style: Neo-classical
- Location: Frederiksværk, Frederiksværk-Vinderød Parish, Halsnæs Municipality, Region Hovedstaden, Denmark
- Coordinates: 55°58′37″N 12°1′57″E
- Construction started: 1776-78
- Renovated: 1908-1909, 2004

Arresødal is a manor estate situated in Frederiksværk, in Halsnæs Municipality on the island of Zealand in Region Hovedstaden, northeastern Denmark. Surrounded by forest to the west of lake Arresø, it now functions as a private hospice.

== History ==
Arresødal was created as a manor in 1773 by Major General Johan Frederik Classen. He ordered the building of the main house in 1786–88. Upon his death, Classen bequeathed Arresødal to Prince Charles of Hesse-Kassel, who owned the property until Crown Prince Frederik (later King Frederick VI of Denmark) bought the property in 1804.

In 1883 the property was purchased by the Classen Fideicommis. It was then a convalescent home for women until 1944 when it was taken over during the Nazi Germany occupation. Later it was taken over by the freedom fighters who used the buildings as a prison. It once again became a convalescent home until 1984 when Arresødal was sold to KMD.

In subsequent years, Arresødal became a training centre and functioned as such until 2002 when the Indian Sai Baba movement bought the building from Kommunedata and took it over on 1 April. The plan was to establish an international school there. But in the light of a pending case against the movement's Indian guru Sai Baba, there was so much opposition from the mayor and local politicians that those responsible chose to withdraw. Frederiksværk Municipality bought the property and had to pay compensation for losses incurred by the movement.

The municipality sold Arresødal to Anette and Carsten Følsgaard who converted it into a private hospital and hospice. The couple took it over on 1 January 2003. The scenic park extending down to Arresø was not part of the sale and the park is now open to the public. Arresødal Private Hospital closed in 2011. The building was sold to the non-profit foundation OK_Fonden in 2017.

== Architecture ==
The main building is designed in the Neoclassical style. It was rebuilt in 1908–09 and partly in 2004. Two other buildings on the estate are protected.

== Owners ==
- (1773–92) Johan Frederik Classen
- (1792–1804) Prince Charles of Hesse-Kassel
- (1804–08) Christian VII
- (1808–39) Frederik VI
- (1839–46) Christian VIII
- (1846–55) Den Danske Stat
- (1855–65) K.A. Larssen
- (1865–83) Laurentse Thodberg
- (1883–1984) Det Classenske Fideicommis
- (1984–2002) Kommunedata
- (2002–2002) Sathya Sai Baba Landsforeningen i Danmark
- (2002–03) Frederiksværk Kommune
- (2003– ) Anette Følsgaard / Carsten Følsgaard
