= Jan Friis-Mikkelsen =

Danish chef and restaurateur (born 1963)

Jan Friis-Mikkelsen (born 26 February 1963) is a Danish chef and restaurateur. He was also judge on DR1's Den Store Bagedyst, the Danish version of The Great British Bake Off.

== Career ==
Jan Friis Mikkelsen was born in the Frederiksberg district of Copenhagen. He trained as a chef in France. In 1987, he opened Restaurant Tinggården in Asserbo outside Frederiksværk. The restaurant is based in a three-winged farmhouse from 1702.

Friis-Mikkelsen first appeared on television as Claus Meyer's co-host in the DR1 cooking show Meyers Køkken ("Meyer's Cuisine") in the 1990s. In 2012-2016 he has appeared as judge alongside Mette Blomsterberg on Den Store Bagedyst.

He is also involved in the production of cherry wines on the Frederiksdal Estate on Lolland.

== Written works ==
- Desserter
- Caféretter
- Grill fra panden
- Jans Kogebog (2004)
