= Peter Hersleb Classen =

Norwegian-Danish statesman

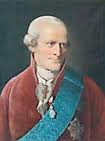
Peter Hersleb Classen

Peter Hersleb Classen, frequently also P. H. Classen, (10 March 1738 – 19 May 1825) was a Norwegian-Danish statesman and director of Det Classenske Fideicommis.

== Career ==
Classen was born in Christiania, Norway. After completing schooling in Christiania in 1756, Classen attended the University of Copenhagen. From 1764 to 1787, he occupied a range of posts in the high-level college of commercial advisors known as Kommercekollegiet and also received increasingly high-ranking appointments as konferensråd (royal councillor), etatsråd (state councillor) and gehejmekonferenceråd (privy councillor).

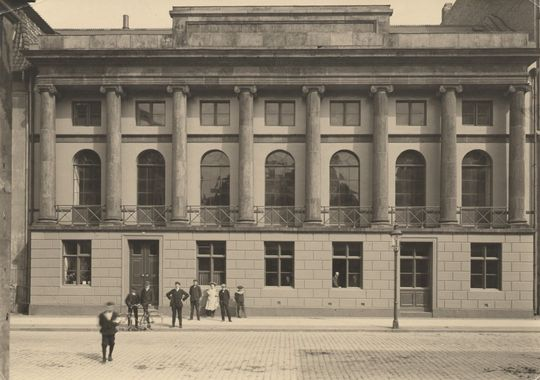
The library building at 38 Amaliegade, Copenhagen (c. 1900)

Classen had shown special interest in the cotton factory on Blegdamsvej in Copenhagen's Østerbro district. When it came into private ownership in 1782, despite the fact that he was one of its shareholders, he was charged with its supervision on behalf of the state, contributing significantly to its expansion. However, when on one occasion he supported the factory's position rather than that of the State, he was severely reprimanded, losing the support of the king. In 1784, he received a further disappointment when he was moved from second to third place in Kommercecollegiet so that Johan Ludvig Reventlow could move into his position. From that time on, on the grounds of poor health, he no longer participated in the college's deliberations, instead spending most of his time in Paris.

In 1792, on the death of his brother, the enterprising industrialist Johan Frederik Classen, he returned to Denmark, where he untiringly strove to implement his will which had laid out terms for establishing Det Classenske Fideicommis, a charitable foundation. When the foundation built a library at 38 Amaliegade in Copenhagen, it was by a design of Classen, an amateur architect, who was probably assisted by Andreas Kirkerup. Until his death, Classen devoted all his time and energy to the management of the estate and the fideicommiss, living at the Corselitze manor on the island of Falster where he took special care of the local workers and their families. He in turn also left a considerable fortune to the foundation when he died in Copenhagen in 1825.

== Personal life ==
Classen had at least one son, Peter Hersleb Classen the Younger.

== Awards ==
Classen became a Knight of the Dannebrog in 1793 and was awarded the Order of the Elephant in 1823. He also became an honorary member of the Royal Danish Academy of Sciences and Letters (1815).
