= Frederiksværk-Vinderød Parish =

Parish in Halsnæs Municipality, Denmark

Frederiksværk-Vinderød Parish Frederiksværk-Vinderød Sogn
- Parish
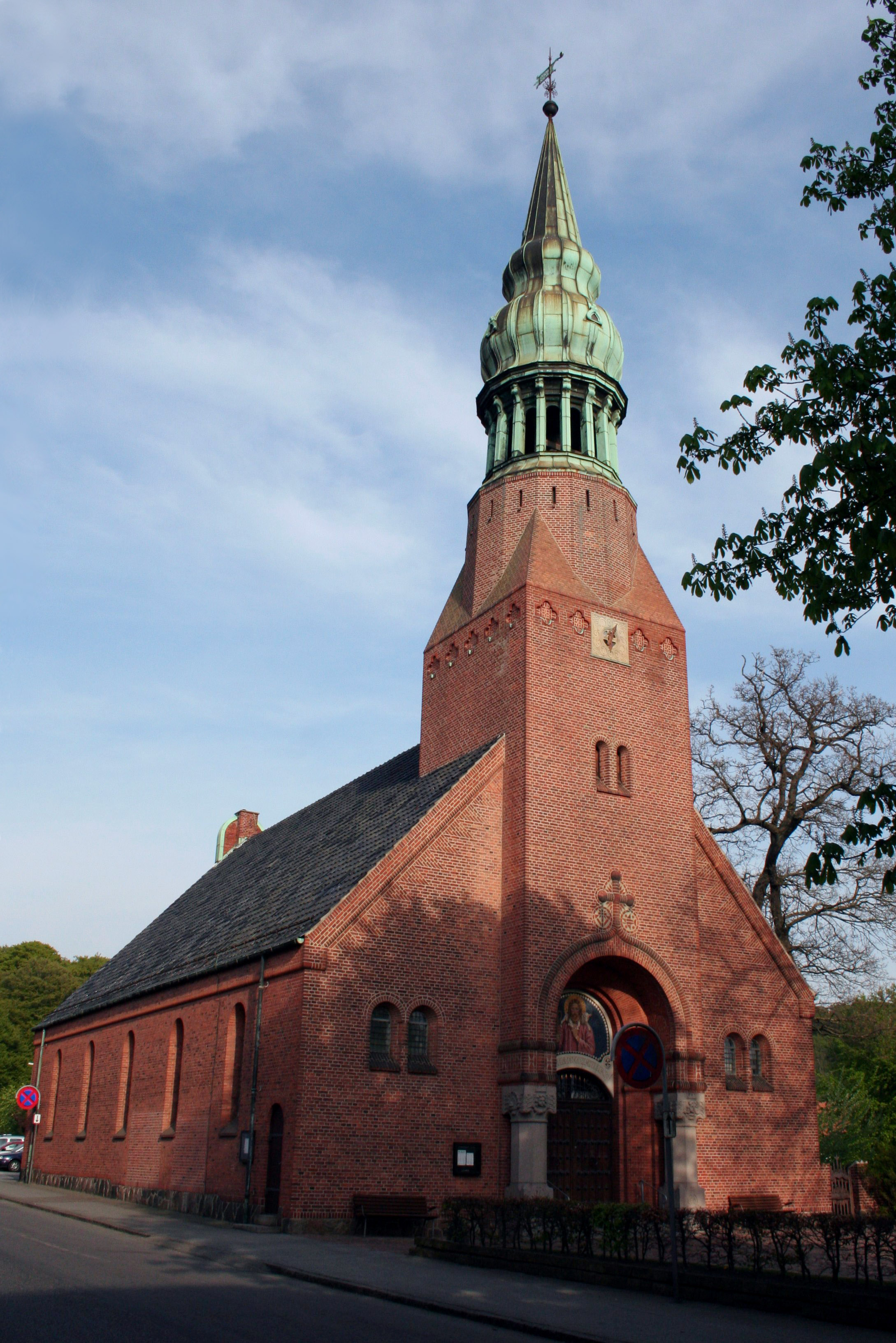
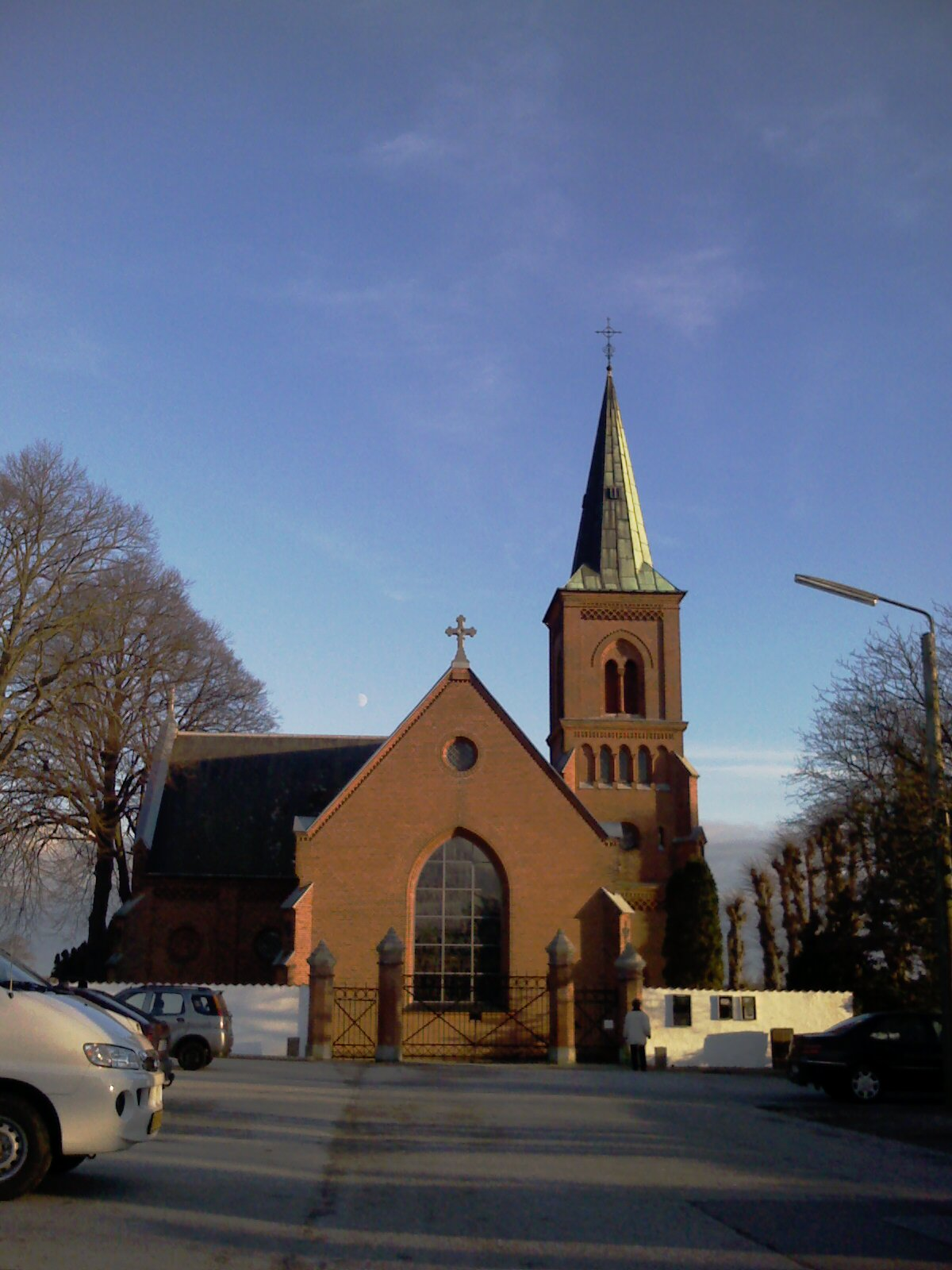
- Frederiksværk Church (left), Vinderød Church (right)
- Country: Denmark
- Region: Capital
- Municipality: Halsnæs Municipality
- Diocese: Helsingør
- Established: 1 July 2014

Population (2025)
  - Total: 9,326
- Parish number: 9186
- Website: www.frederiksvaerk-vinderoed.dk

Frederiksværk-Vinderød Parish (Danish: Frederiksværk-Vinderød Sogn) is a parish in the Diocese of Helsingør in Halsnæs Municipality, Denmark. The parish contains the town of Frederiksværk and the satellite town of Vinderød.

The parish was formed on 1 July 2014 by a merger of Frederiksværk Parish (Frederiksværk Sogn) and Vinderød Parish (Vinderød Sogn). Prior to the merger, Frederiksværk Parish had been parish number 7397, and Vinderød Parish had been 7398.
