= Asserbohus =

Demolished building in Denmark

Coordinates: 56°0′27″N 12°0′36″E

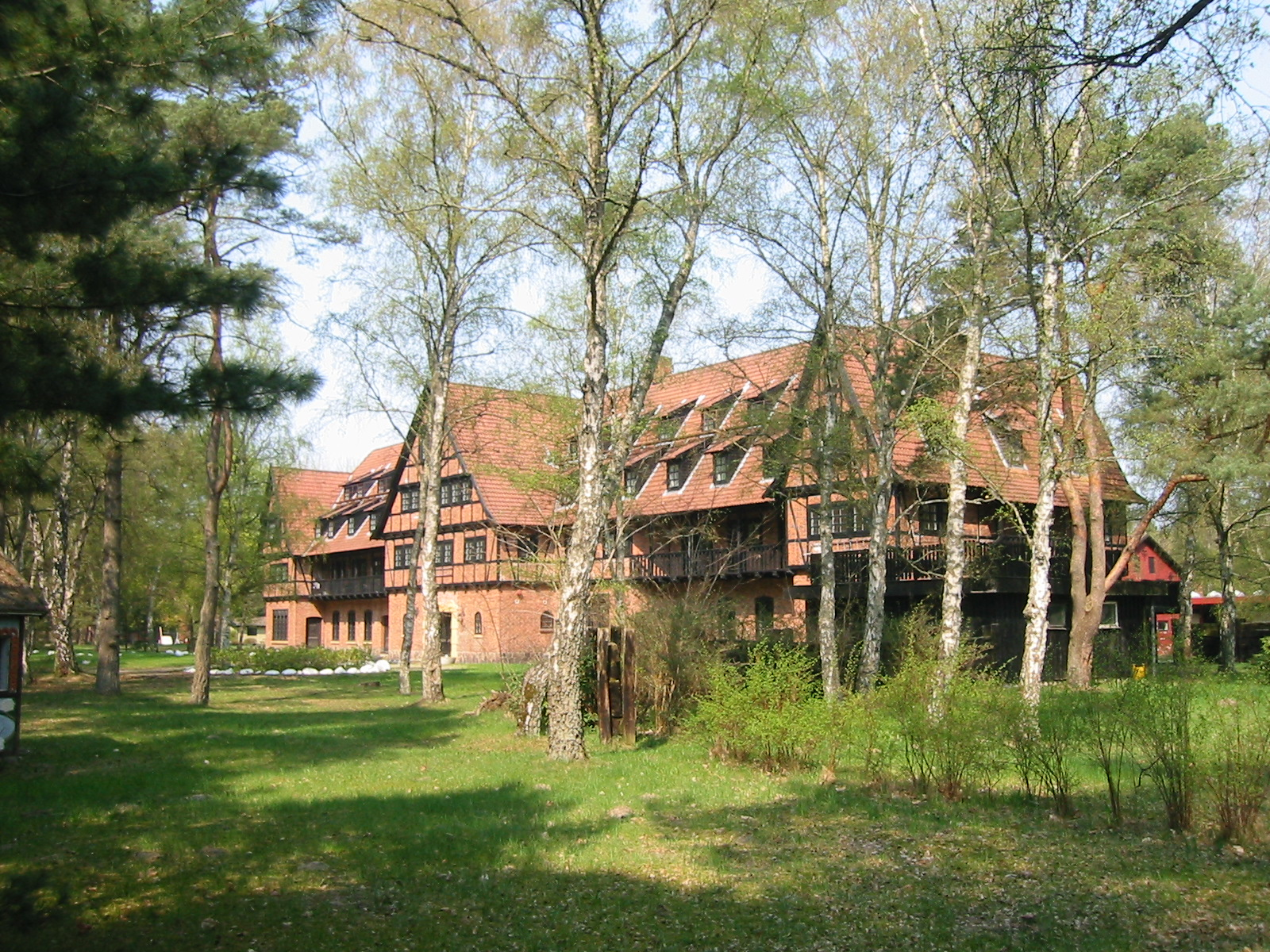
Asserbohus

Asserbohus was a former hotel at Asserbo in Halsnæs Municipality, Denmark.

== History ==
Asserbohus was built by antique dealer Henry Skaanström in 1933 as a luxury hotel, not far from the northern beach of Asserbo. The main building is a total of 2306 m². For the most part, Asserbohus is built from recycled materials, including columns from a large sailing ship.

From 1957 to 1978, Asserbohus was a boarding school. From 1978 Asserbohus has been owned by Tvind, which ran another school between 1978 and 2004. In January 2012 a fire broke out. The buildings were later demolished to make way for the construction of vacation homes.

In 2014, Asserbohus sold for DKK 5.25 million despite it was originally set for sale for DKK 25 million.
