= Johan Frederik Classen =

Danish-Norwegian industrialist, major general and landowner

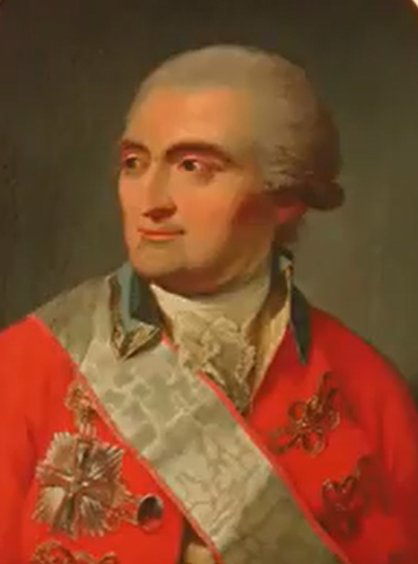
- Born: 11 February 1725; Christiania, Norway
- Died: 24 March 1792 (aged 67); Arresødal, Denmark
- Military career
- Allegiance: Denmark–Norway
- Rank: Major General

Johan Frederik Classen, frequently also J. F. Classen, (11 February 1725 – 24 March 1792) was a Danish-Norwegian industrialist, major general, landowner and founder of Det Classenske Fideicommis. He served as chancellery adviser to King Frederik V. Classen built the manor house Arresødal in 1773, he renovated the Neoclassical manor house Corselitze in 1777, and built the General's Summerhouse by the Corselitze Forest.

== Early years ==
Classen was born in Oslo (then called Christiania), where his father (from Sønderborg on the Danish island of Als), was an organist. The father, who had the same name as his son, was born 1697 and died 1775; his mother, Maria, born Walter (1702-1768 ), was from a Norwegian farmer family. After having gone through grammar school in his hometown, he became a theology candidate at University of Copenhagen in 1741, taking his examinations three years later.

== Career ==
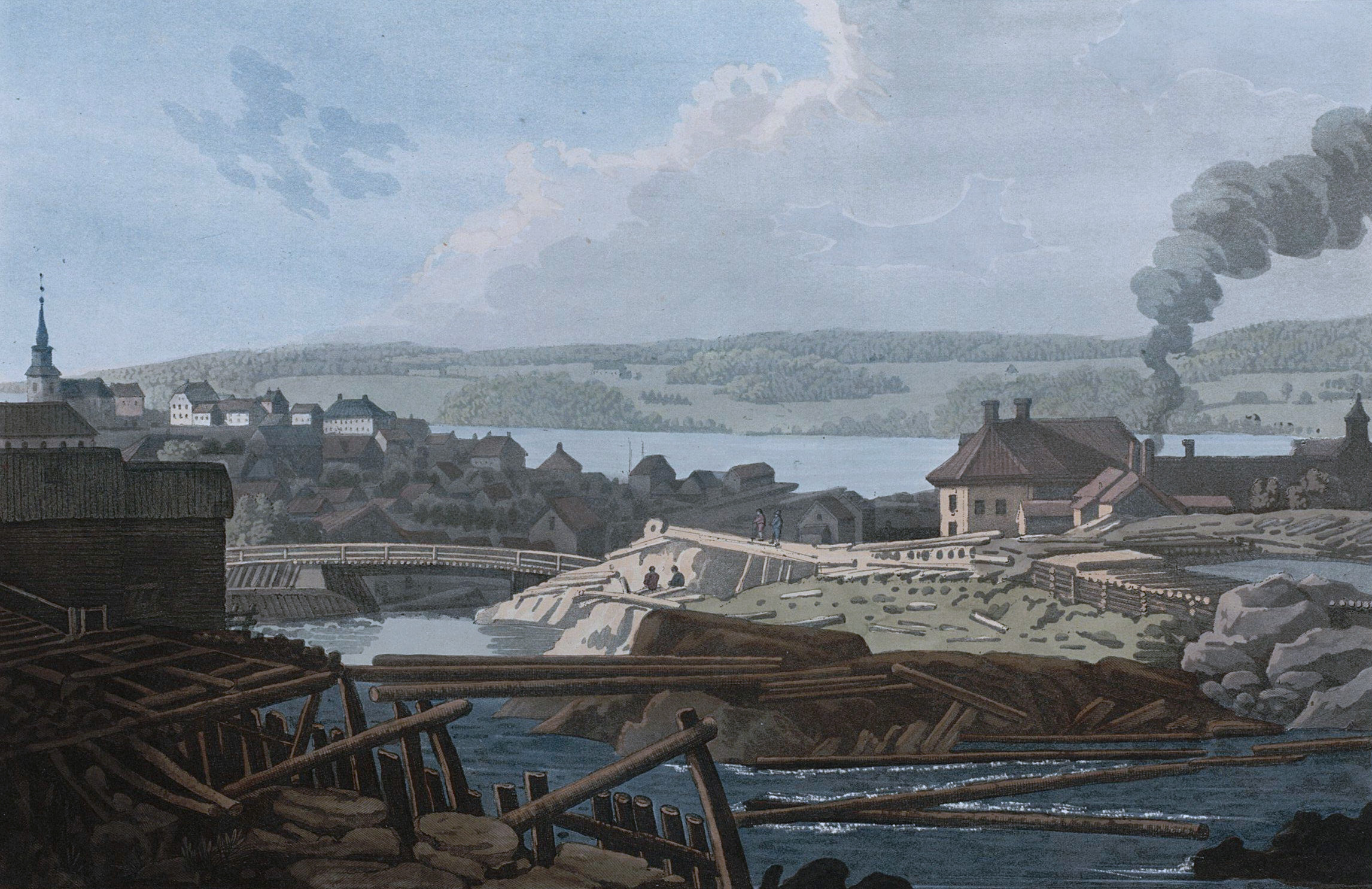
Classen was a commissioner of the Moss Cannon Foundry.

Despite his studies, it was not Classen's intention to make a theological career. He seems immediately to have thrown himself into other activities after coming into contact with Norwegian businessmen, possibly also participating in the high-level college of commercial advisors known as Kommercekollegiet of which a relative, Counsellor Christian Walter, was a member. When Frederik V visited Norway in 1749, Classen accompanied Admiral Andreas Rosenpalm, who was associated with various Norwegian businessmen including Erik Anker and Matthias Wærn of Norway's Moss Cannon Foundry. When only 24, Classen became a supplier of munitions to the State, in particular as commissioner for the Moss foundry, a post he held until c. 1759. As such, he conducted negotiations with army headquarters. He seems to have had influential friends in the king's immediate circle. In 1751, he received the title of Chancellry Counsellor and in 1753, was appointed Secretary of Kommercekollegiet.

Immediately after the 1750 death of the Danish merchant, Andreas Bjørn, Classen became involved in the annual delivery of munitions to the Berbers in Algiers. He began by delivering 8,000 cannonballs, followed by gunpowder (500 centner), rope and timber, soon receiving a permanent contract to provide the delivery annually. His international trading ties developed through his connection with the former Spanish ambassador in Copenhagen, Marqués de Puente Fuerte. The work brought him into contact with a variety of industrialists, inciting him to become a businessman himself.

In 1754, Classen unsuccessfully sought to establish a glassworks; the following year, he bought a ceramic kiln factory outside Copenhagen's Østerport. In 1756, a dispute arose between Classen and the directors of the Moss foundry, and by 1759, Classen ceased to be an agent there.

The same year, Frederik V entrusted Classen and another businessman, Just Fabritius, with land at Agatmølle, the point where the Arresø runs into Isefjorden, on which to develop a cannon and munitions factory. De Peyrembert, a Frenchman, had unsuccessfully attempted to produce cannons there. Responding to the king's wishes, Classen and Fabritius embarked not only on the production of cannons and gunpowder but on all types of weaponry. As the land had been allocated by Frederik V, Classen named the foundry "Frederiksværk"; it became Denmark's first factory town. Fabritius provided the capital but it was Classen who became the active leader of the Frederiksværk operations, receiving the appointment of Commissioner General for War and Munitions with the title of chancellor. The business did well, benefitting from supplies for the Seven Years' War from 1756. Although he was interested in the technical side of the enterprise, it was above all Classen's abilities as an administrator and businessman which led to the factory's success.

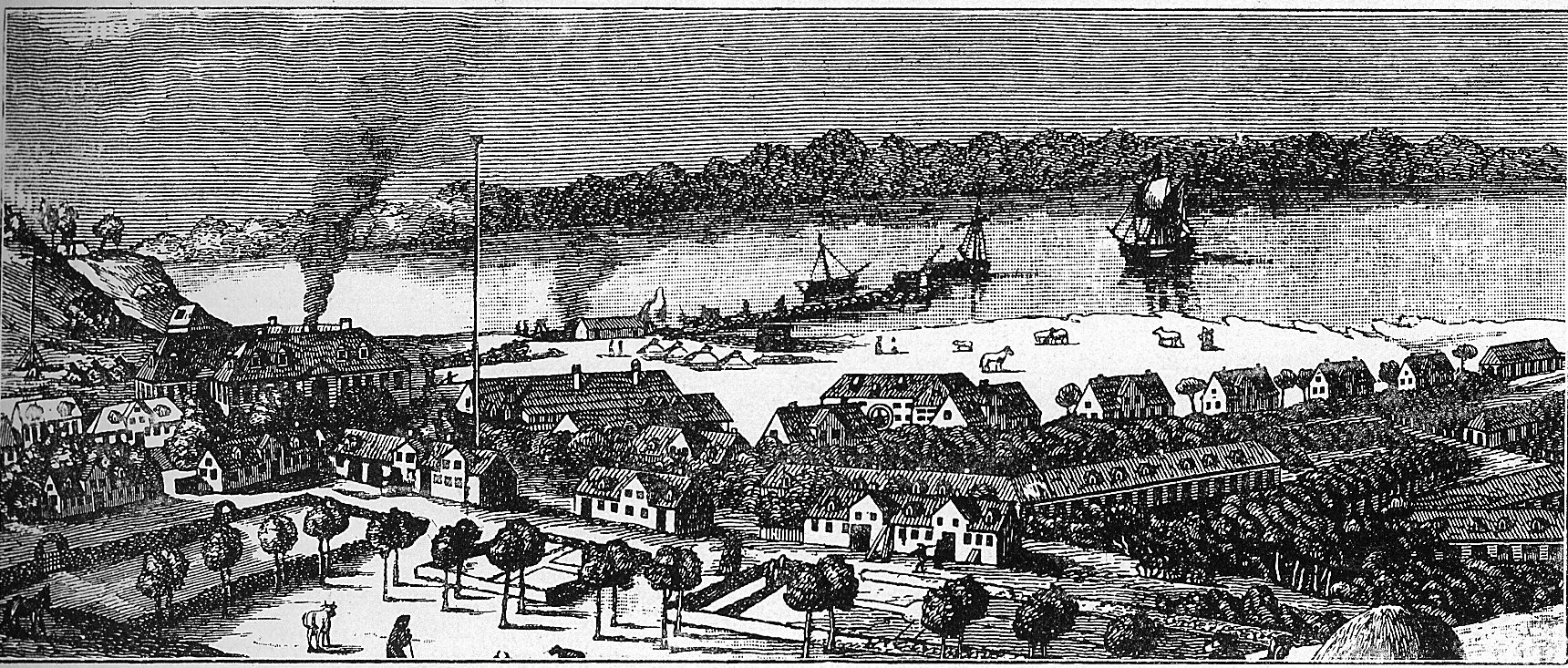
Depiction of Frederiksværk at the time of Classen.

Within a few years, Frederiksværk became Denmark's one and only industrial town. Thanks to the quality of both its gunpowder and cannons, the factory quickly became competitive. By 1765, the number of workers had increased to some 400. While there were later minor reductions in the workforce, the factory was able to support the development of a small town as the facilities expanded to include a watermill, a brickyard, an oven foundry, a candle factory, a decorative iron works, a goldsmiths and a rope walk. Classen's enterprise also received support from the State. In 1760, to supplement the workforce a number of tenant farms were transferred to the enterprise and in 1764 all the tenant farms in the surrounding parishes of Kregme, Vinderød, Melby and Torup were included, as well as Halsnæs, Rorup and Havelse Skove came under its jurisdiction. In 1757, as commissioner for war and munitions, Classen earned 800 rigsdaler a year while in 1760, he received the position of commissioner general of the army commissariat, the body with which he signed contracts for army supplies. When Fabritius said he wished to withdraw from Frederiksværk, the king bought the factory for 130,000 rigsdaler, but Classen was allowed to remain in control so that "on his own account he can pick and choose as he wishes."

One of Classen's patrons was Saint-Germain who was striving to improve Danish artillery. In 1767, with the agreement of the king, this led to a contract whereby Frederiksværk and its only real competitor, the Kronborg rifle factory, were to support Classen while the State committed an annual sum of 120,000 rigsdaler over the next 30 years for the purchase of arms and munitions from the two factories. Shortly afterwards, however, Saint-Germain was dismissed and in April 1768, an investigative committee was set up with Classen's opponent, Ditlev Reventlow (1712–1783) as chairman. The committee found that the arrangements had all been set up in favour of Classen with the result that he had to give up the Kronborg rifle factory, which was transferred to Heinrich Carl von Schimmelmann, and pay 100,000 rigsdaler for Frederiksværk without any guarantee of contracts from the state. After an attempt to reestablish Copenhagen's Gjethuset as a cannon foundry proved unsuccessful, Classen concluded a contract with the army in 1770 which guaranteed that he was to be its sole supplier of gunpowder and cannons. The contract, which also specified an annual subsidy for operating the factory in addition to payments for the supplies, was renewed every year until Classen died. Furthermore, Frederiksværk concluded contracts for supplying weapons and munitions to large trading companies and to the navy. In 1769, the business was extended to produce stoves and cooking pots although not all Classen's attempts to bring other industries to the town were successful.

== Other occupations ==
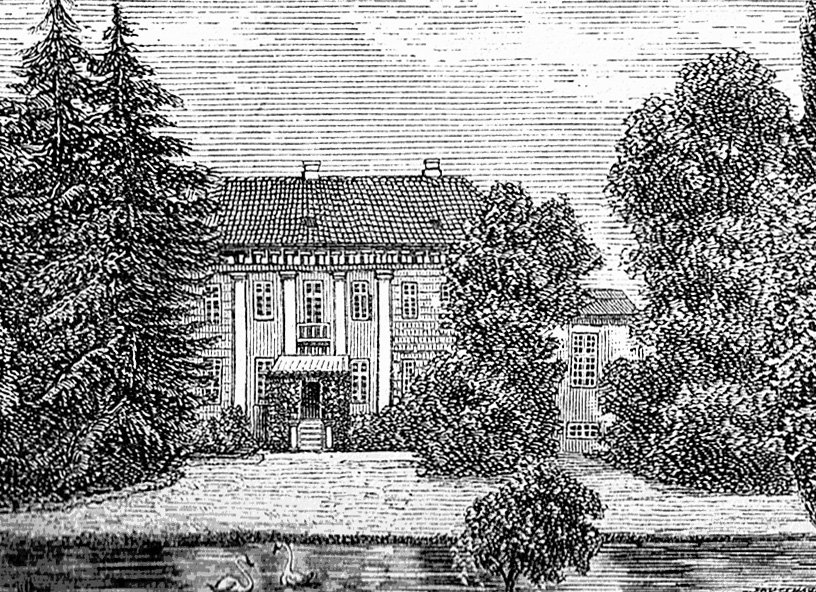
Classen built the manor house of Corselitze during the period of 1775-1777.

In addition to his industrial and trading activities, Classen was also interested in agriculture and forestry. In 1768, he bought the Corselitze and Carlsfeldt estates on Falster from Prince Charles of Hesse-Kassel and, in 1773 and 1776, established Arresødal and Grønnesøgård on the Frederiksværk estate. His powers of initiative and administration also benefitted his agricultural ventures. He established the fishing communities of Sølager and Liseleje and developed large-scale plantations around Frederiksværk although his eagerness to persuade farmers to adopt better production methods does not appear to have led to meaningful results.

In 1756, he bought a summer residence with a large garden near Østerport from the Danneskjold-Laurwigenske heirs. He increased its size in 1765 when he bought an adjacent property known as Fiskerhuset from Hans von Ahlefeldt. Today it is known as Classens Have (Classen's Garden). A patron of literature, Classen bought books at home and abroad until he had amassed a large library.

== Recognition ==
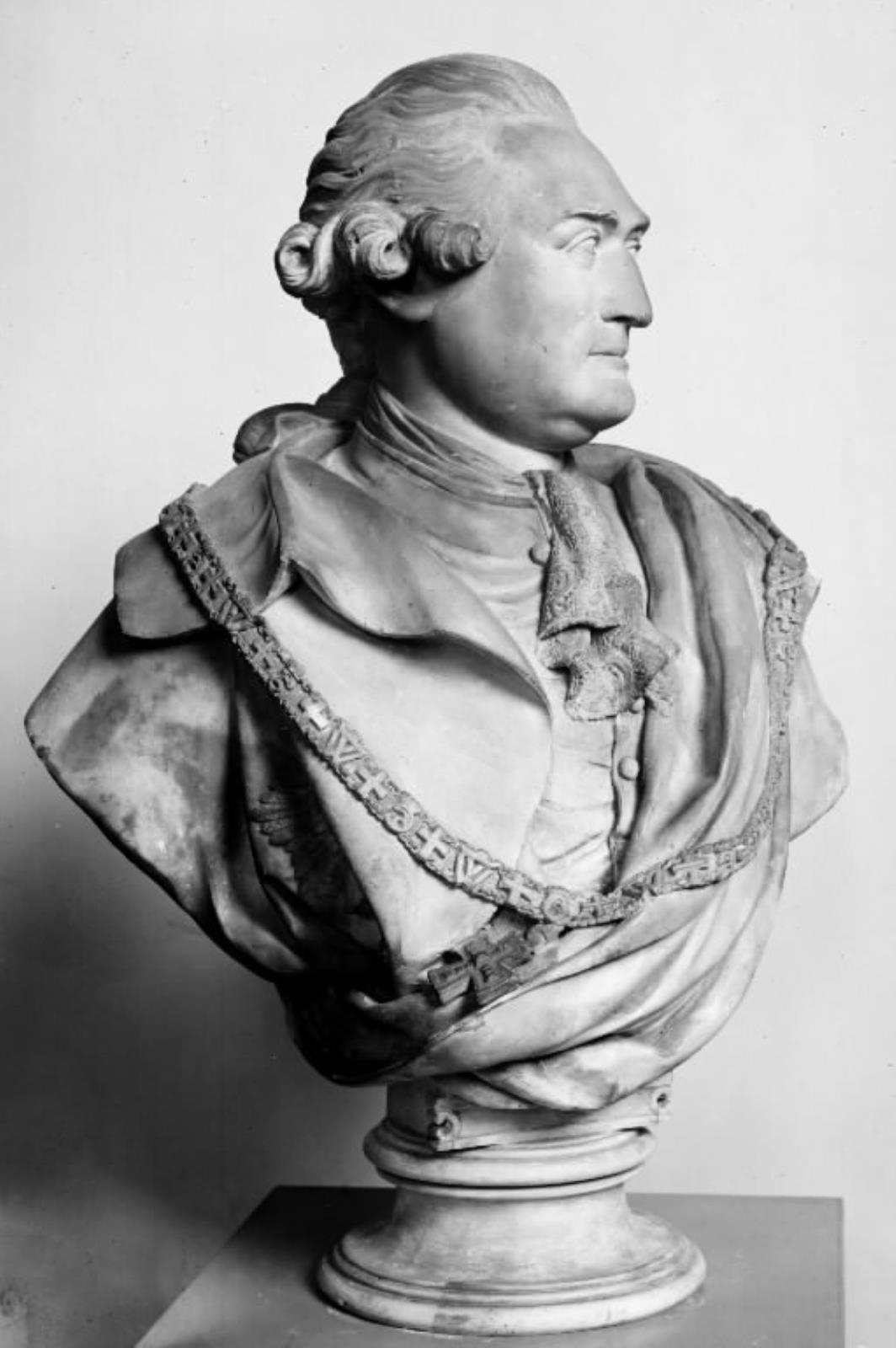
Bust of Classen by Johannes Wiedewelt, 1803.

Classen's extensive business operations brought him both wealth and recognition. In 1775, he was given the title of major-general and was awarded the Order of the Dannebrog while in 1783 he received the status of excellency. He also enjoyed friendships with the most influential figures of the times including Adam Gottlob Moltke, Hans Ahlefeldt, the Bernstorffs, Saint-Germain, Ove Høegh-Guldberg, General Heinrich Wilhelm von Huth and General Peter Elias von Gähler.

== Legacy ==
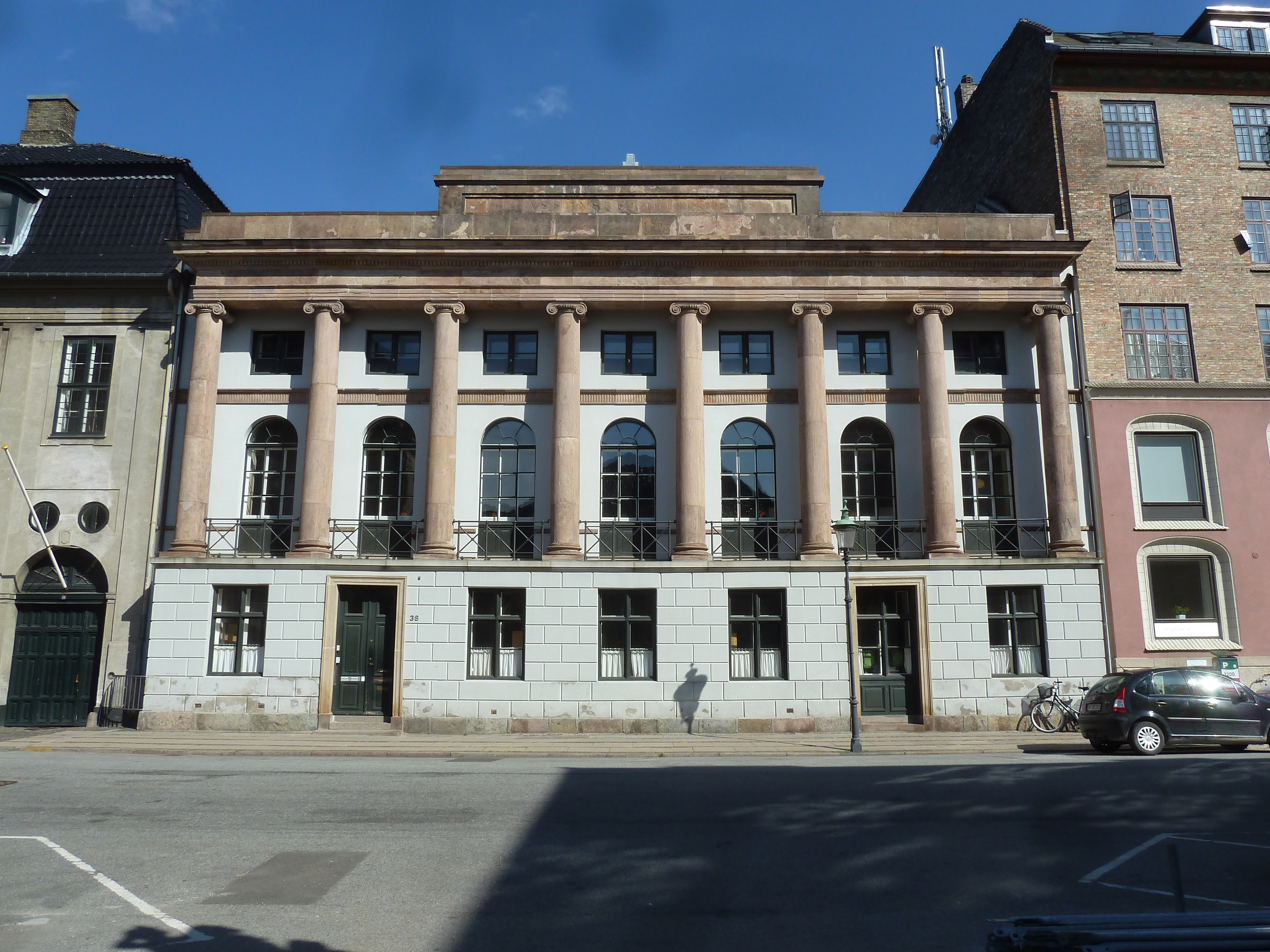
The Classen Library in Copenhagen

In his will, with the exception of Frederiksværk, Classen left all his assets and possessions to a charitable foundation, Det Classenske Fideicommis. It was to be used "to educate good people to become the best in the State, to support and promote industriousness and diligence in the areas most necessary for the country's well-being, and to help to alleviate poverty and misery." The fund, still with considerable assets today, has been used to establish Næsgaard Agerbrugsskole, a farming school in Stubbekøbing, Falster (now Næsgaard Efterskole). The Classen Library in Amaliegade in Copenhagen was built for his extensive library of some 20,000 volumes, with significant collections in the areas of economics, geography and science. In 1867, it was shared between the Agricultural University and the University Library in Copenhagen.

== Personal life ==
Classen married Anna Elisabeth Fabritius de Tengnagels (1735-1786). She had two daughters from her first marriage, Marie Margarethe Baroness Iselin (1756-1814) and Anna Elisabeth Baroness Iselin (1760-1805). His brother, Peter Hersleb Classen (1738–1825), a high-level State official, later became director of Det Classenske Fideicommis.
