= Frederiksværk =

- Town
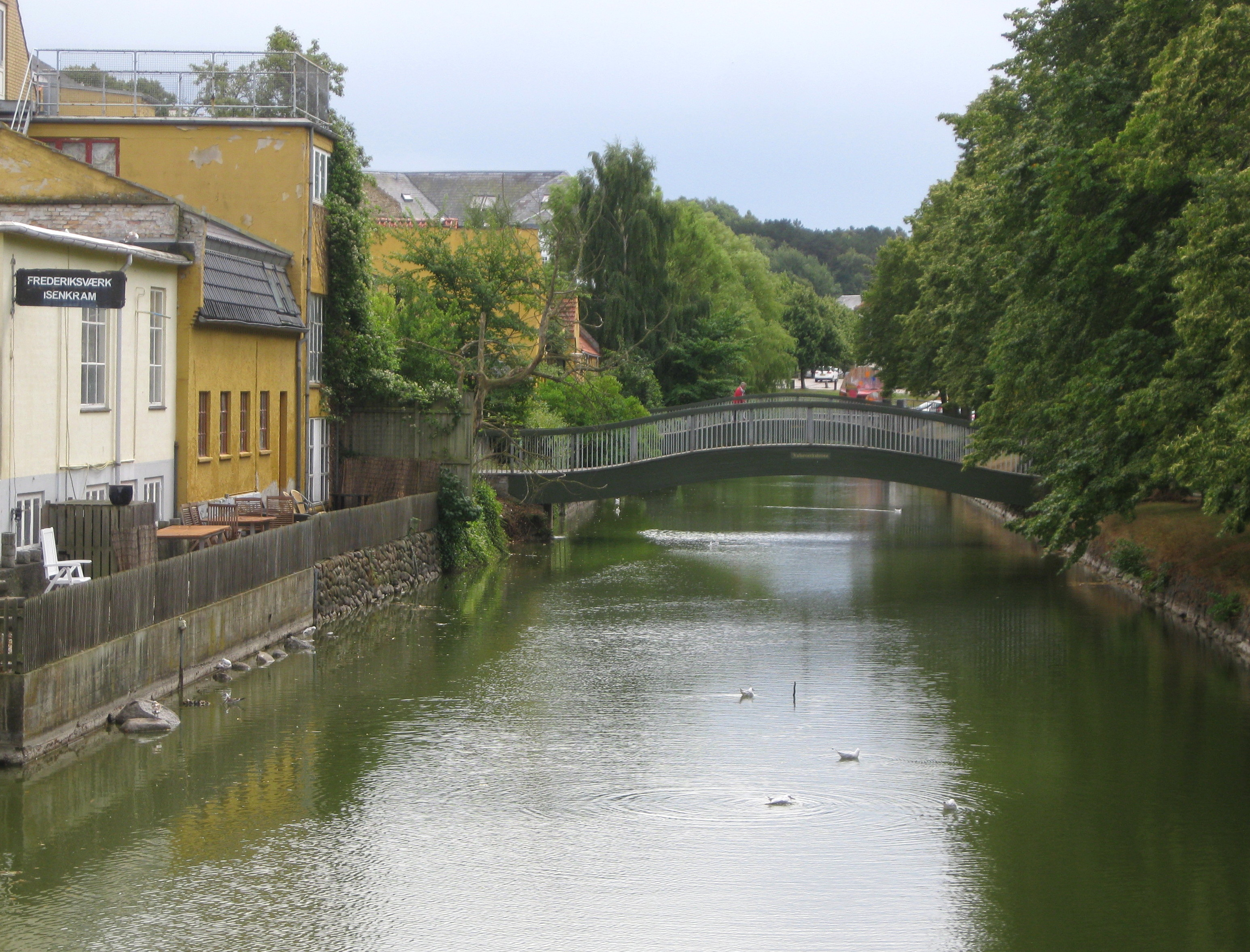
- View of the canal

- Coat of arms

- Location within Denmark Location within Capital Region
- Coordinates: 55°58′00″N 12°01′00″E
- Country: Denmark
- Region: Capital Region
- Municipality: Halsnæs
- Parish: Frederiksværk-Vinderød

Area
  - Urban: 8.3 km^{2} (3.2 sq mi)

Population (2026)
  - Urban: 12,884
  - Urban density: 1,600/km^{2} (4,000/sq mi)
  - Gender: 6,409 males and 6,475 females
- Demonym: Frederiksværker
- Time zone: UTC+1 (GMT)
- Postal code: 3300 Frederiksværk

Frederiksværk is a town with a population of 12,884 (1 January 2026) in Halsnæs Municipality on Zealand in Region Hovedstaden in Denmark.

== History ==
A French cannon founder, Peyrembert, received permission to build a cannon factory here. Having gotten into difficulties, King Frederik V requested that his chancellery advisor, Johan Frederik Classen, take over the operation of the foundry. Under Classen's management the town blossomed, and there came a gunpowder mill, as well as light industry and handicrafts to the town. This resulted in Classen's being appointed major general. On 25 August 1756 the king issued a document permitting Classen to call the town "Friederichswerk".

Classen was allowed to build a new foundry, Gjethuset, and it was constructed between 1761 and 1767. It has been used as a cannon foundry until 1928, and has been used for heavy industry until 1976. The building has been restored and reopened on 12 June 1996. It is now used as an art and culture center with theatre, music and art exhibitions. The original architect was either Lauritz de Thurah or Nicolai Eigtved. The word Gjethus comes from Low German Gethus and means "foundry house".

Classen's home in the neoclassical style, Arresødal, is still standing. It is in private ownership, but can be viewed from the outside.

== Attractions ==
There are a number of churches from the Middle Ages in the villages near Frederiksværk. Vinderød Church, in the town of Frederiksværk, houses the sarcophagus of General Classen and has a view towards the Arresø.

=== Town Museum ===
The Town Museum is established in the old Arsenal, which was used as a storehouse for the cannons cast in Gjethuset. Displays in the museum concern weapon fabrication, gunpowder production and copper rolling during the years 1750 to 1900. There is also a restored grocery store from 1900.

=== The Gunpowder Mill Museum ===
The small open-air museum, part of the Industrial Museum Frederiks Værk, contains one of the world's best-preserved powder mills with buildings and working machines from 1800. There is also a working watermill on the premises.

=== Castle ruins ===
The ruins of Dronningholm Castle lie near the Arresø. It was started by Valdemar the Great, and continued by his son Valdemar the Victorious. The castle was one of the largest in the country. but burned down in 1525. According to legend the castle was given as a gift to Queen Dagmar.

The ruins of Asserbo Castle are also open to the public for viewing and touring. Asserbo Castle, which lies in the woods of Tisvilde Hegn, was founded by Bishop Absalon in the 12th century and was used as a monastery for monks of the Cistercian Order, originally invited from France. The King took claim of the castle c. 1560, and then by drifting sands. The castle was reclaimed from the sands, first by King Frederik VII in 1849, and then by the National Museum of Denmark excavations in 1972.

=== GeoArt: art gallery & crystalmuseum ===
GeoArt is located at the northern tip of Lake Arre, between Frederiksværk and Helsinge. It has an art gallery with changing exhibitions and a permanent exhibition of gems and minerals including 225 million year old petrified wood from Arizona, amethyst from Brazil and fluorite from China.

== Frederiksværk municipality ==
Until 1 January 2007 Frederiksværk was also a municipality (Danish; kommune) in Frederiksborg County on the island of Zealand (Sjælland) in eastern Denmark, located between Lake Arre (Arresø) and Roskilde Fjord. The municipality covered an area of 90 km², and had a total population of 20,340 (2005). Its last mayor was Helge Friis, a member of the Social Democrats (Socialdemokraterne) political party.

Frederiksværk municipality ceased to exist due to Kommunalreformen ("The Municipality Reform" of 2007). It was merged with existing Hundested municipality to form the new Frederiksværk-Hundested municipality. The name was changed to Halsnæs Municipality on 1 January 2008. This created a municipality with an area of 120 km² and a total population of c. 30,253.

=== Municipal information ===
The municipal Frederiksværk contained many small towns and villages besides the city of Frederiksværk, including Ølsted, Kregme, Liseleje, Asserbo and Melby.

== See also ==
- Asserbo Charterhouse
- Asserbohus
- Frederiksværk Gymnasium
- Frederiksværk railway station

== Notable people ==
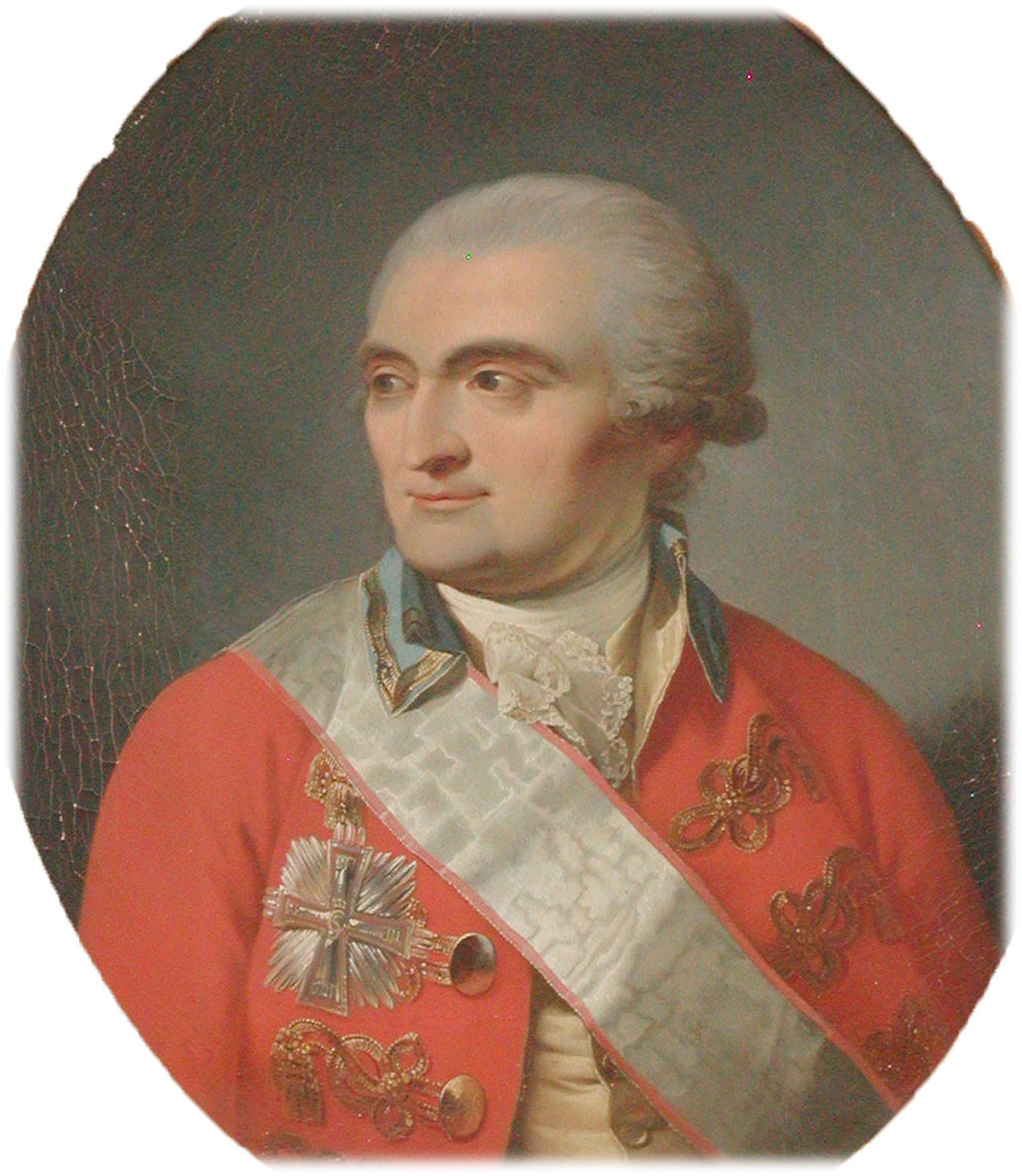
Johan Frederik Classen

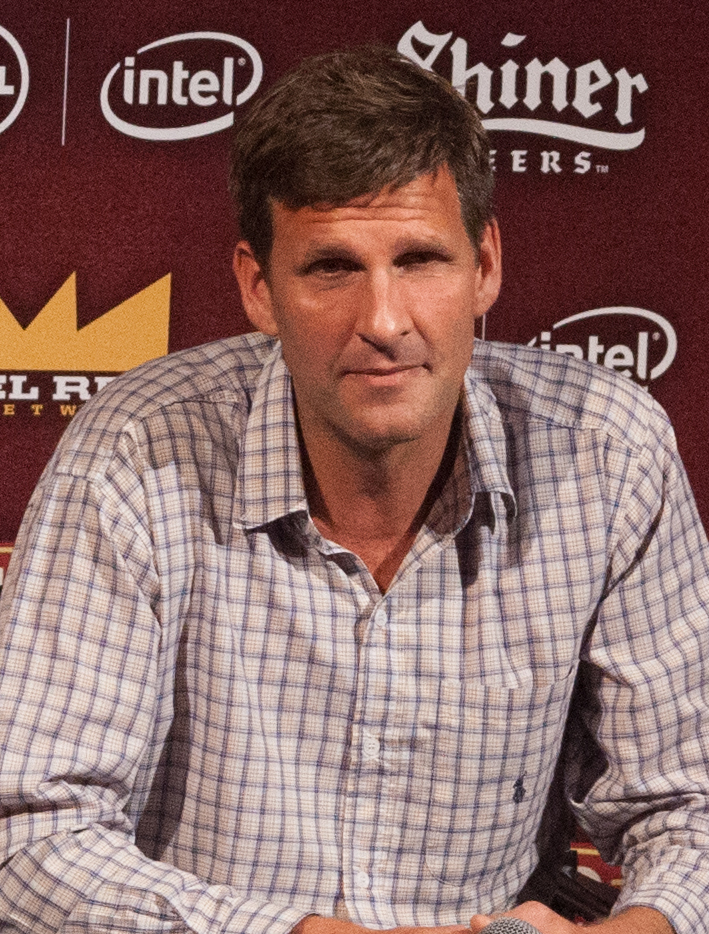
Anders Thomas Jensen, 2015

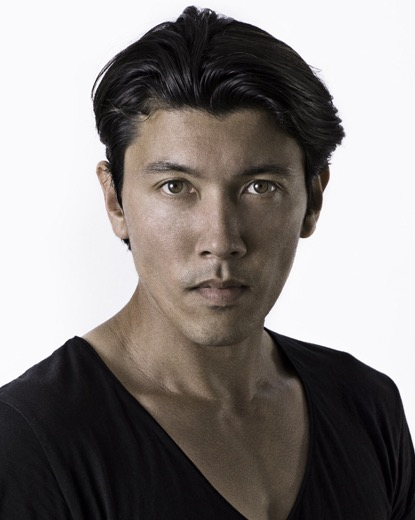
David Sakurai, 2013

- Johan Frederik Classen (1725–1792) a Danish-Norwegian industrialist, major general, landowner and founder of Det Classenske Fideicommis
- Anton Frederik Tscherning (1795–1874) a Danish army officer who became a politician
- Arnold Krog (1856–1931) a Danish architect, painter, designer and artistic director of Royal Copenhagen 1884–1916
- Knud Larsen (1865 in Vinderød – 1922) a Danish painter of landscapes and later portraiture
- Aase Hansen (1893–1981) a Danish educator, translator and award-winning writer
- Knut Ansgar Nelson (1906—1990) convert to Roman Catholicism, served as Bishop of Stockholm 1957–1962
- Francis Cardenau (born 1957) a Denmark-based French chef and restaurateur, lives on a small farm close to Frederiksværk
- Thomas Blom Hansen (born 1958) an anthropologist and commentator on violence in India
- Jan Friis-Mikkelsen (born 1963) a Danish chef and restaurateur, runs Restaurant Tinggården in Asserbo since 1987
- Anders Thomas Jensen (born 1972) a Danish screenwriter and film director
- David Sakurai (born 1979) a Japanese-Danish actor, director, scriptwriter and martial artist; brought up in Frederiksværk

=== Sport ===
- Henrik Hansen (1920–2010) a wrestler, bronze medallist at the 1948 Summer Olympics
- Svend Ove Pedersen (1920–2009) a rower, team bronze medallist at 1952 Summer Olympics
- Leif Hermansen (born 1925) a Danish rower, competed at the 1952 Summer Olympics
- Tage Juhl Weirum (born 1949) a Danish wrestler, competed at the 1972 Summer Olympics
- Benny Nielsen (born 1951) a Danish former football player, played 28 matches for Denmark
- Thomas Frank (born 1973) a Danish football manager, in charge of Crystal Palace F. C.
- Kim Christensen (born 1980) a Danish football coach of Frederiksværk FK, former player with over 200 club caps
