= Det Classenske Fideicommis =

Danish charitable foundation

Det Classenske Fideicommis (literally "The Classen Fideicommiss") is a Danish charitable foundation. By testament in 1789 and his codicil of March 23, 1792, the industrialist Major General Johan Frederik Classen left behind his wealth and possessions as a fund, among other things, to "alleviate poverty and misery". It grants about 2 million kroner ($340,000) annually.

== Background ==
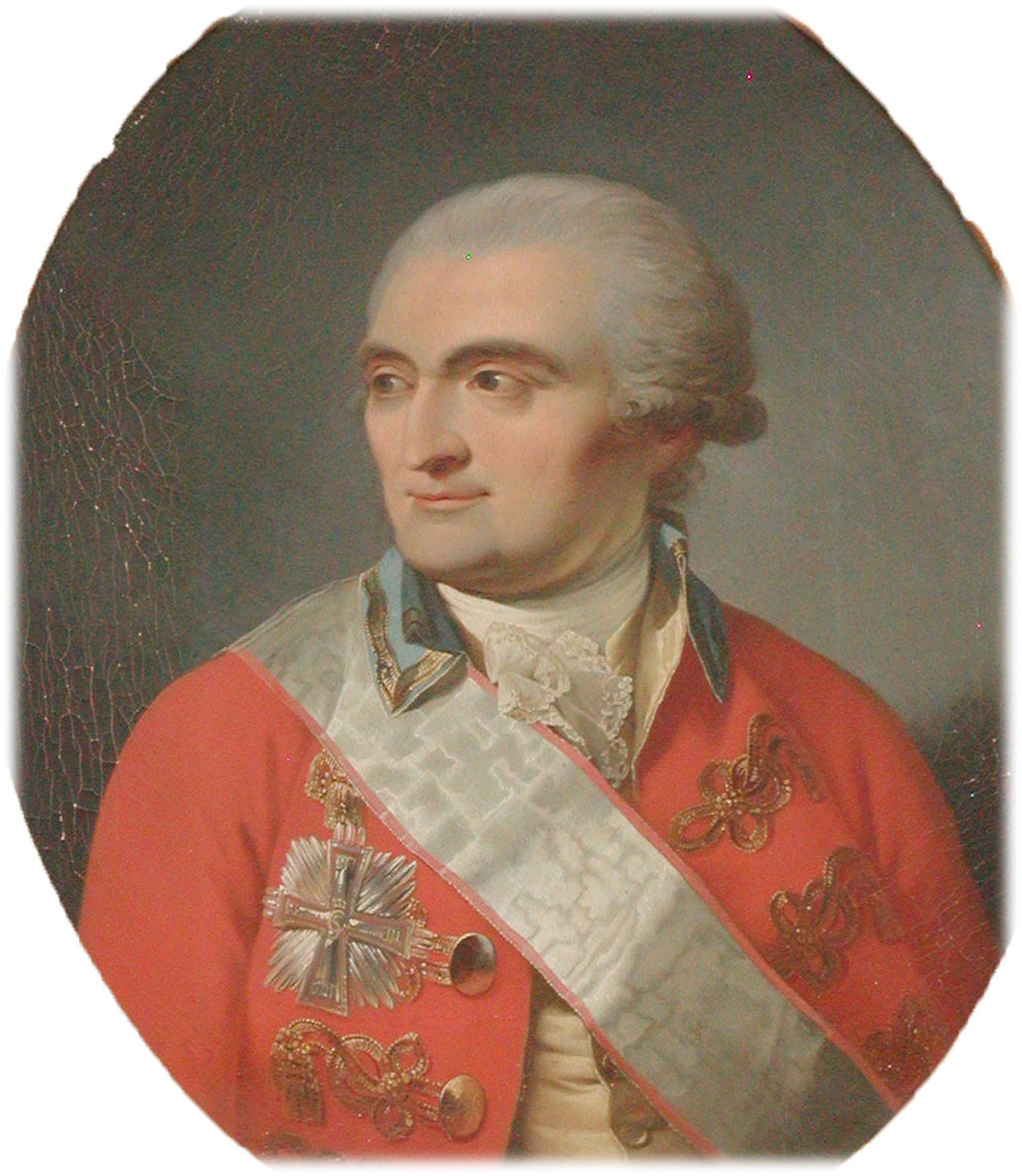
Det Classenske Fideicommis was founded by Johan Frederik Classen.

Classen (1725–1792) was an enterprising businessman and industrialist who developed an armaments and munitions factory in northwest Zealand. He called it Frederiksværk (Frederik's factory) in honour of King Frederik V who had provided land and incentives for its establishment. Thanks to the profits he made as sole supplier to the Danish army, especially during the Seven Years' War (1756–1763), Classen was able to expand his production facilities and attract other industries to Frederiksværk which quickly became a thriving town and major industrial centre. In addition to his business activities, Classen was adept at farming and forestry. In 1768, he bought land on Falster, where he comprehensively renovated Corselitze, a large manor house, and in 1773 he developed large-scale plantations in the Frederiksværk area. Major General Classen built himself a summerhouse by the Corselitze Forest.

== Classen's legacy ==
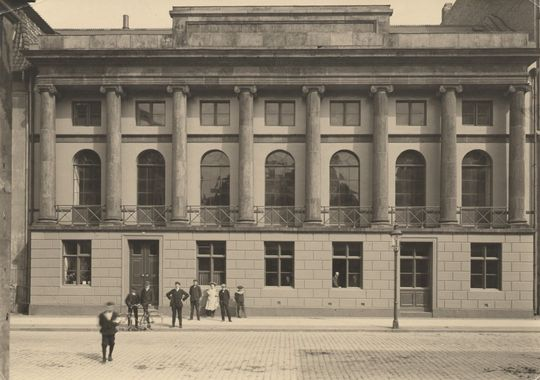
The Classen Library building at 38 Amaliegade in Copenhagen

Classen had built up a library of some 20,000 volumes as well as a large collection of minerals, instruments, and sheet music. For many years he had suffered from gout which was particularly painful towards the end. By the time of his death, he had become one of the most important figures in the country with titles of major general and knight of the Dannebrog and the style of excellency.

In his will, he made specific provisions for grants to hospitals and schools as well as assistance for the tenants on his estates. He also left a sum specifically for establishing a farming school. With the exception of Frederiksværk, all his other assets and possessions were left to a charitable foundation known as Det Classenske Fideicommis. The will clearly defined its scope, stating it was to be used:

to educate good people to become the best in the State,
to support and promote industriousness and diligence in the areas most necessary for the country's well-being, and
to help to alleviate poverty and misery.

It took almost four years to draw up an inventory of Classen's estate which proved to have a value of 1 million rigsdaler.

Classen's brother, Peter Hersleb Classen, a high-ranking government official, became the principal administrator of Det Classenske Fideicommis until his death in 1825. P. H. Classen was also instrumental in establishing Næsgaard Agerbrugsskole, a farming school in Stubbekøbing, Falster (now Næsgaard Efterskole). Classen's cousin, Michael Classen, also participated in the administration of the fund, together with his son, P. H. Classen junior, who lived at Corselitze and did much to improve conditions for the local population. In the 19th century, a total of 161 farms and 242 other building were sold when the copyhold farms came into private ownership. The cannon foundry together with the other businesses and farms, including Arresødal near Frederiksværk were also sold off in line with the terms of the will. The last significant sale on Falster took place in 1917 with the disposal of Carlsfeldt, Vestergård and Kongsnæs.
