= List of windmills in Denmark =

This is a list of windmills in Denmark.

== Bornholm ==
See List of windmills on Bornholm

== Funen and South Funen Archipelago ==
Location	Name of mill	Type	Built	Notes	Photograph
Aarup	Aarup Mølle	Smock			
Faaborg	Grubbe Mølle	Smock			
Faaborg	Åstrup Mølle	Tower			
Faaborg	Dorthebjerg Mølle		1879		
Kerteminde	Kerteminde Mølle	Smock		Windmill World	
Langeland	Tranekær Slotsmølle	Smock	1846	Source	
Odense	Maderup Mølle, Den Fynske Landsby	Smock	1832	Windmill World	
Odense	Lumby Mølle	Smock	1820		
Otterup	Uggerslev Mølle	Smock			
Ulbølle	Ulbølle Mølle	Tower			
Ærø	Søby Mølle	Smock			
Ærø	Vester Mølle	Smock			

== Lolland-Falster and surrounding islands ==
Location	Name of mill	Type	Built	Notes	Photograph
Bogø	Bogø Mølle	Smock			
Bogø	Bogø Mølle	Tower			
Ejegod	Ejegod Mølle	Smock	1876		
Majbølle	Majbølle Mølle	Post	1612	1624	
Majbølle	Majbølle Mølle	Post	1664	Demolished 1760	
Majbølle	Majbølle Mølle	Post	1760	Demolished 1895	
Majbølle	Majbølle Mølle	Smock	1896		
Nakskov	Kappel Mølle	Post	1790		
Nakskov	Nakskov Mølle	Post			

== Zealand ==
Location	Name of mill	Type	Built	Notes	Photograph
Agersø	Agersø Mølle	Smock	1892		
Albertslund	Røde Vejrmølle	Smock		Original mill burned down in 1973. Replaced with Fristrup Mill, a mill of similar appearance moved from Tølløse.	
Christianshavn	Lille Mølle	Post	1669	Demolished 1783	
Christianshavn	Lille Mølle	Smock	1783	Demolished 1916, base converted to residential accommodation.	
Copenhagen				Blown down 1847.	
Copenhagen	Kastellet Mølle	Smock	1847		
Dorthebjerg	Dorthebjerg Mølle	Smock			
Nørre Jernløse	Nørre Jernløse Windmill	Smock			
Faxe	Blåbæk Mølle	Smock			
Hørsholm	Hørsholm Windmill	Smock	1890-1	The mill is now owned by Hørsholm Municipality and is open to the public on Saturdays in the summer.	
Jægerspris	Jægerspris Mølle	Smock	C. 1854		
Kongens Lyngby	Karlstrup Stubmølle; Frilandsmuseet	Post	1662	Post mill, originally from Karlstrup, Zealand, now relocated to the Danish National Open Air Museum	
Kongens Lyngby	Laesø Stubmølle; Frilandsmuseet	Post		Post mill, originally from the island of Laesø, now relocated to the Danish National Open Air Museum as part of the Laesø Farm	
Kongens Lyngby	Fuglevad Mølle	Post			
Kongens Lyngby	Fuglevad Vindmølle; Frilandsmuseet	Smock	1832	Smock mill, the only building in the Danish National Open Air Museum still in its original location. Windmill World	
Lille Egbjerg	Lille Egbjerg Mølle	Smock		Danish windmills	
Lille Skensted	Lille Mølle	Smock		Windmill World	
Love	Løve Windmill	Smock		Windmill World	
Lumsås	Lumsås Mølle	Smock	1834	Danish Windmills	
Melby	Melby Windmill	Smock	1876		
Ramløse	Ramløse Mølle	Smock			
Rørvig	Rørvig Mølle	Smock		Danish windmills	
Slagelse	Mariendals Mølle	Smock		Mill is situated in an area of housing near to western ring road	
Tibberup	Tibberup Mølle	Smock	c. 1870	Now converted into a house and workshop.	

== Other ==
Location	Name of mill	Type	Built	Notes	Photograph
Aarhus	Aarhus Mølle	Post			
Agernæs	Agernæs Mølle	Tower			
Børglum	Kloster Mølle	Smock			
Dybbøl	Dybbøl Mølle	Tower	1864		
Ebeltoft	Ebeltoft Mølle	Smock		Panoramio	
Em	Em Mølle	Smock			
Fjerritslev	Lyngmøllen	Smock	1886		
Grenaa	Baunhøj Mølle	Smock	1849		
Gylling	Gylling Mølle	Smock			
Hadsund	Havnø Mølle	Smock			
Hjerl Hede	Hjerl Hede Mølle	Post			
Højer	Højer Mølle	Smock			
Jels	Jels Mølle	Tower			
Kandestederne	Kandestederne Mølle	Smock	1850		
Kerteminde	Kerteminde Mølle	Smock		Windmill World	
Kongens Lyngby	Lyngby Mølle; Frilandsmuseet	Smock		Windmill World	
Lille Egbjerg	Lille Egbjerg Mølle	Smock		Danish windmills	
Lille Skensted	Lille Mølle	Smock		Windmill World	
Lønstrup	Lønstrup Mølle	Smock			
Nørre Jernløse	Nørre Jernløse Mølle	Smock			
Nørre-Snede	Nørre-Snede Mølle	Smock	1848	Dismantled 1975, re-erected at Elk Horn, Iowa in 1976.	
Odense	Landsby Mølle, Den Fynske Landsby	Smock		Windmill World	
Odense	Lumby Mølle	Smock			
Pandrup	Klostergårds Mølle				
Sindal	Sindal Mølle	Tower		House conversion	
Skagen	Skagen Mølle	Smock		Windmill World	
Sønderho	Sønderho Mølle	Smock			
Ulbølle	Ulbølle Mølle	Tower			
Ulsted	Ulsted Mølle	Smock			
Vejle	Vejle Mølle	Tower			
Vendsyssel	Vennebjerg Mølle	Smock			

== See also ==
- Lists of wind turbines in Denmark

== Notes ==
Surviving mills are in bold. Known building dates are in bold text. Non-bold text denotes first known date.
