= Melby =

Melby can refer to the following:

== People ==
- Bob Melby (1928–2019), American optometrist and politician from Florida
- Ernest O. Melby (1891–1987), professor, dean, and university president
- Gaute Melby Gundersen (born 1972), Norwegian hurdler
- Guri Melby (born 1981), Norwegian politician
- James C. Melby (1949–2007), wrestling historian
- John Melby (born 1941), American composer
- John F. Melby (1913–1992), American diplomat
- Michael Melby (born 1969), Swedish politician

== Places ==
- Melby, Halsnæs Municipality, a village in Halsnæs municipality in the Capital Region of Denmark
  - Melby Windmill, a smock mill located at Melby in Halsnæs Municipality, Denmark
- Melby, Funen, a village in Funen, Denmark
- Melby, Shetland, a village in the Shetland islands in Scotland
- Melby, Norway, a village in the municipality of Skaun in Trøndelag county, Norway
- Melby, Minnesota, an unincorporated community in the United States

== See also ==
- Melbury (disambiguation)
- Medelby
- Mejlby
- Melmerby (disambiguation)
