= Karlstrup Windmill =

Windmill in Denmark

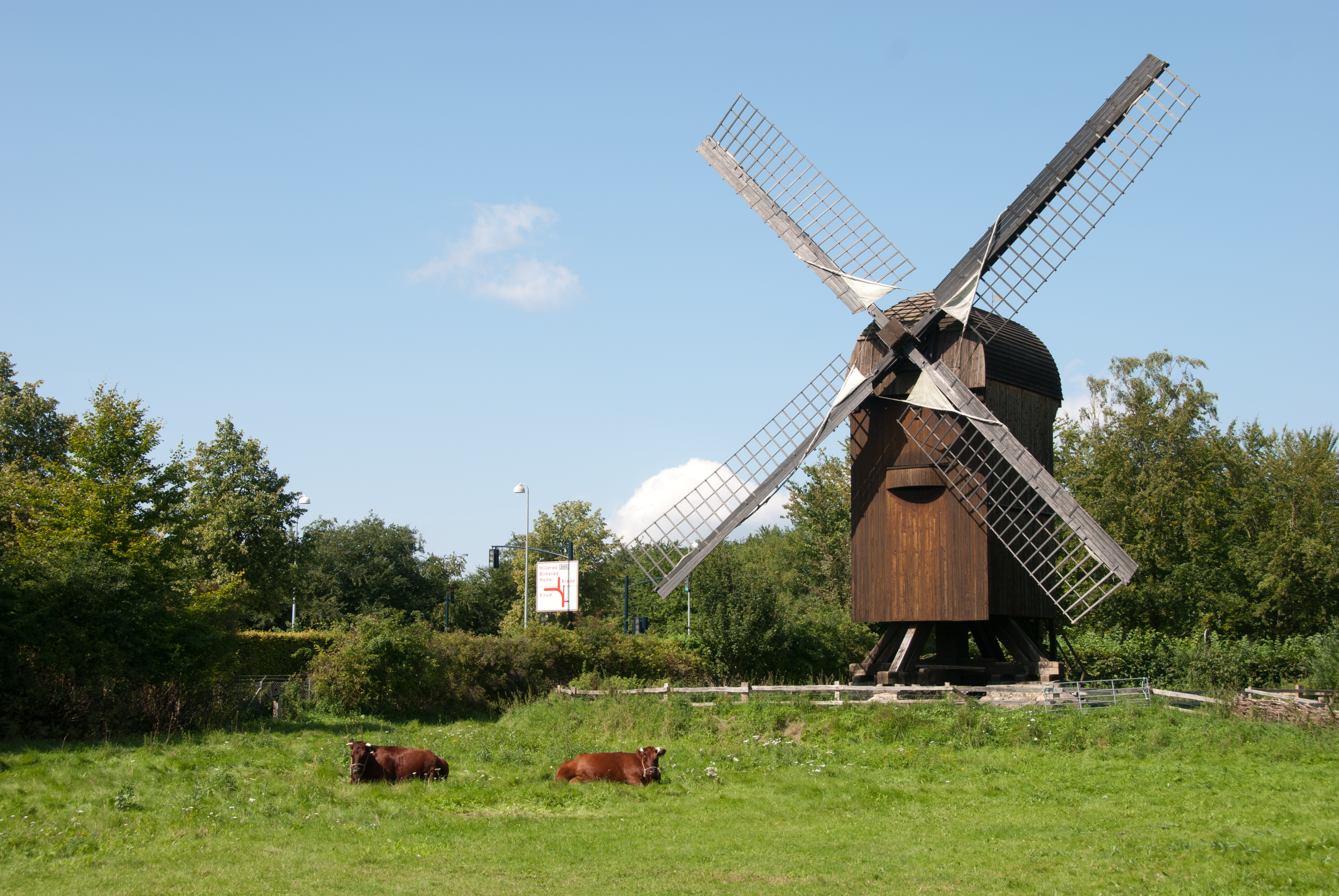
- Karlstrup Windmill in the Frilandsmuseet
- Interactive map of Karlstrup Windmill

Origin
- Mill name: Karlstrup Windmill
- Mill location: Kongens Lyngby, Denmark
- Coordinates: 55°47′11.2″N 12°29′21.8″E
- Year built: 1662

Information
- Type: Post mill

The Karlstrup Windmill (Danish: Karlstrup Stubmølle) is a post mill in the Sorgenfri neighborhood of Kongens Lyngby in Denmark.

== Description ==
The three-storey post mill sits on a stump that allows the mill to rotate and capture wind. The windmill then power a millstone to produce flour.

== History ==
The Karlstrup Windmill was built in 1662 in Karlstrup, a village southwest of Copenhagen, in the Solrød Municipality and was rebuilt in 1793. The windmill primarily produced flour but was modified in 1798 to also peel barley. The mill had a local monopoly on milling flour within a two-mile radius of the mill until 1849, when the first Danish constitution abolished monopolies. In 1921, the windmill was acquired by the Frilandsmuseet and moved to the open-air museum's grounds a year later.

== In popular culture ==
In 2011, the Karlstrup Windmill appeared on the eighth episode of The Amazing Race 19.

== See also ==
List of windmills in Denmark
