= Vagn Holmboe =

Danish composer (1909–1996)

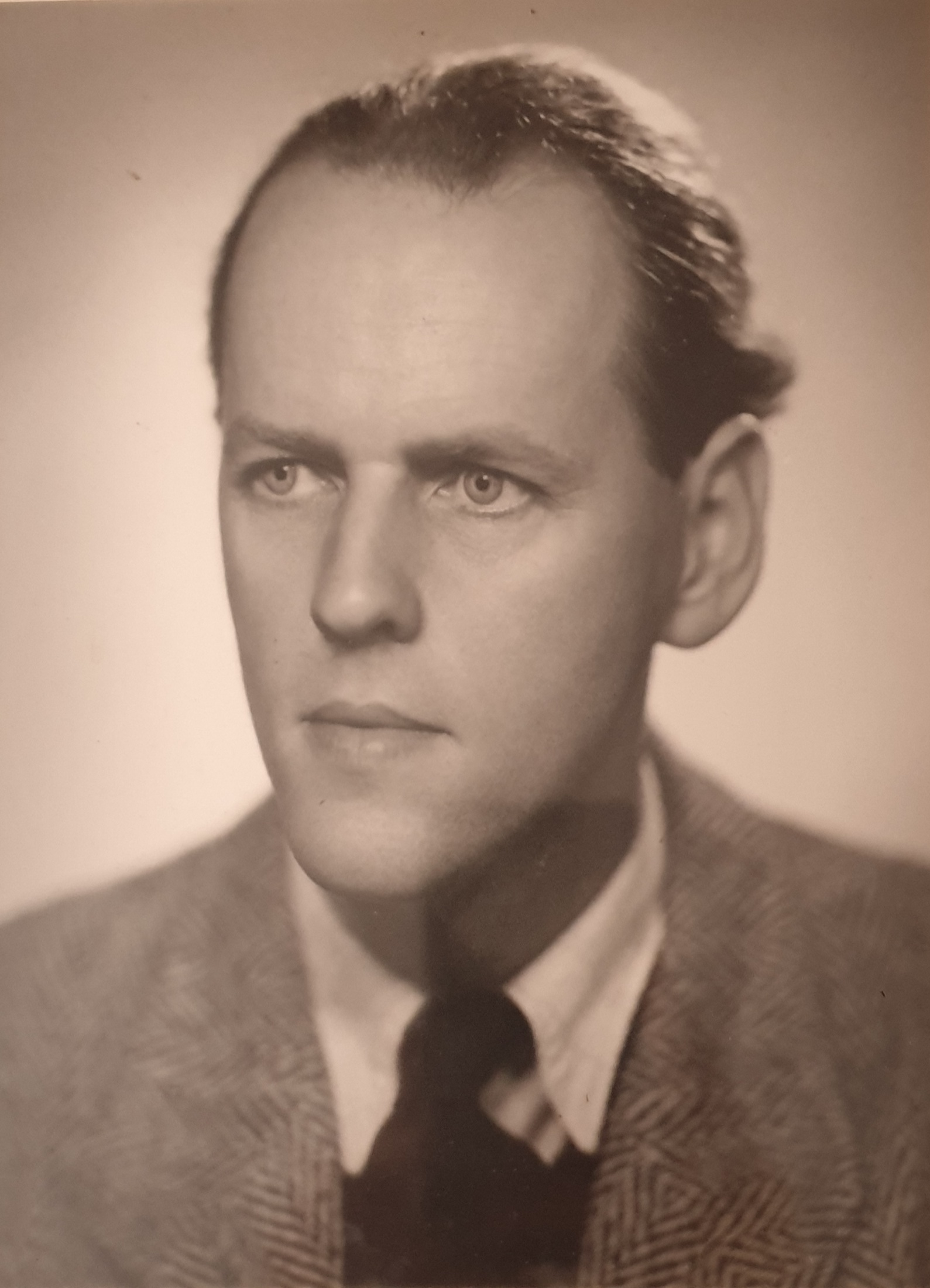
- Holmboe c. 1950
- Born: 20 December 1909; Horsens, Jutland, Denmark
- Died: 1 September 1996 (aged 86); Ramløse, Zealand, Denmark
- Education: Royal Danish Academy of Music
- Occupations: Composer; music critic; teacher
- Spouse: Meta May Graf (m. 1933; died 2003)

Vagn Gylding Holmboe (Danish pronunciation: [ˈvɑwˀn ˈhʌlmˌpoˀ]; 20 December 1909 – 1 September 1996) was a Danish composer and teacher.

== Early life and education ==
Vagn Holmboe was born in Horsens, Jutland, into a merchant family of dedicated amateur musicians. Both parents played the piano. His father earned his living as a maker of colours and lacquers at Horsens. The Danish journalist Knud Holmboe was his elder brother.

From the age of 14 Vagn Holmboe took violin lessons. In 1926, at the age of 16, he began formal music training at the Royal Danish Academy of Music in Copenhagen on the recommendation of Carl Nielsen. He studied under Knud Jeppesen (theory) and Finn Høffding (composition).

== Career ==
After finishing his studies in 1929 he moved to Berlin where for a short period Ernst Toch became his teacher. During his time in the German capital he met the Romanian-born pianist and visual artist Meta May Graf (1910–2003) from Sibiu/Hermannstadt. She had studied at the Musikhochschule Berlin since 1929, with Paul Hindemith as one of her teachers. The couple married in 1933 and left Berlin for Romania, where they visited obscure and remote villages and studied Transylvanian folk-song. Subsequently, they moved to Denmark, settling in the capital, Copenhagen, in 1934. While his wife Meta gave up her musical career to pursue her passions in the visual arts, photography in particular, Vagn gave music lessons privately and began composing during this period. Many of the early compositions have never been performed. Similar to the research he had already done in Romania, he pursued his studies of folk-song with much field-work throughout Denmark including the Faroes and Greenland. Many overtly folk-linked compositions, including the Inuit Songs, are a result of these activities.

From 1941 to 1949 he was a teacher at the Royal Institute for the Blind, and from 1950 to 1965 he taught at the Royal Conservatory in Copenhagen, being appointed a Professor there in 1955. Prior to that, he had also worked as a music critic for the Danish daily Politiken from 1947 to 1955.

Vagn Holmboe's students included Per Nørgård, Ib Nørholm, Bent Lorentzen, Arne Nordheim, Egil Hovland and Alan Stout. See: List of music students by teacher: G to J#Vagn Holmboe.

Vagn and his wife Meta had bought a piece of land at Lake Arresø in Ramløse/Zealand in 1940, where they set up a farm, "Arre Boreale" (Latin for Northern Arresø), in the 1950s and spent the rest of their lives together there. Vagn Holmboe was a keen nature-lover who lived in the countryside until his death in 1996 and over the years personally planted 3000 trees on his land.

== Music ==
Holmboe composed about 370 works, including 13 symphonies, three chamber symphonies, four symphonies for strings, 20 string quartets, numerous concertos, one opera, and the late series of 10 Preludes for chamber orchestra, as well as much choral and other music, in addition to some early works that never received opus numbers. His last work, the 21st string quartet, Quartetto sereno, was completed by his pupil Per Nørgård.

Musical metamorphosis of thematic or motivic fragments characterize most of his works between the years 1950 and 1970; in this regard his music is similar to that written by Jean Sibelius earlier in the twentieth century. His earlier works show the influence of East European composers such as Béla Bartók; his work also shows the influence of Igor Stravinsky, Carl Nielsen and Dmitri Shostakovich.

== Major works ==
(M.—Meta number—for Metamorphosis. Might also be said to be named after his wife, Meta May Holmboe... numbering system assembled by Professor Paul Rapoport.

Symphonies:

- Symphony No. 1, 1935, for chamber orchestra, M. 85
- Symphony No. 2, 1938–9, M. 107
- Symphony No. 3, 1941, Sinfonia rustica, M. 126
- Symphony No. 4, 1941, Sinfonia sacra for chorus and orchestra, M. 132
- Symphony No. 5, 1944, M. 145
- Symphony No. 6, 1947, M. 155
- Symphony No. 7, 1950, M. 167
- Symphony No. 8, 1952, Sinfonia boreale, M. 175
- Symphony No. 9, 1967–9, M. 235
- Symphony No. 10, 1970–2, M. 250 (premiered by the Detroit Symphony Orchestra under Sixten Ehrling)
- Symphony No. 11, 1980–1, M. 304
- Symphony No. 12, 1988, M. 338
- Symphony No. 13, 1993–4, M. 362
- Chamber Symphony No. 1, 1951, M. 171
- Chamber Symphony No. 2, 1968, M. 240
- Chamber Symphony No. 3, 1969–70, M. 246
- Sinfonia in memoriam, 1954–5, M. 185
- Sinfonia I for strings, M. 194
- Sinfonia II for strings, M. 196
- Sinfonia III for strings, M. 200
- Sinfonia IV for strings, M. 215 (Kairos)
- Symphonic metamorphoses for orchestra:
  - Epitaph, 1956, M. 189 (premiered by the BBC Symphony Orchestra)
  - Monolith, 1960, M. 207
  - Epilog, 1961–2, M. 213
  - Tempo variabile (Changeable weather), 1971–2, M. 254

Ten Preludes for Sinfonietta

- No. 1: To a Pine Tree, Op 164, No 1 (1986)
- No. 2: To a Dolphin (1986)
- No. 3: To a Maple Tree (1986)
- No. 4: To a Willow Tree, Op 170, No 4 (1987)
- No. 5: To a Living Stone (1987)
- No. 6: To the Seagulls and the Cormorants, Op 174, No 6 (1987)
- No. 7: To the Pollution of Nature, Op 180, No 7 (1989)
- No. 8: To the Victoria Embankment (1990)
- No. 9: To the Calm Sea, Op 187, No 9 (1991)
- No. 10: To the Unsettled Weather (1991)

Concertos: (about twenty, including especially):

- Concerto for Trumpet and Chamber Orchestra, 1948, M. 157. Eleventh of a series of 13 concertos with chamber orchestra originally called "chamber concertos"
- Cello Concerto, 1974–9, M. 273
- Recorder Concerto, 1974, M. 275
- Flute Concerto No. 1, 1975–6, M. 279
- Tuba Concerto, 1976, M. 280
- Flute Concerto No. 2, 1981–2, M. 307

Choral

- Liber Canticorum, motet series (1951–1984): 34 movements, contained in 17 opus numbers and five volumes
- Requiem for Nietzsche for tenor, baritone, chorus, and orchestra, 1963–4, M. 219

Chamber:

- String Quartets: 21 written, excluding numerous un-numbered student works
  - From No. 1, 1948–9, M. 159 to No. 20, 1985, M. 322 (this the last of four works representing the times of the day) (also a twenty-first, Quartetto sereno, completed by Per Nørgård)
- Notturno for wind quintet, 1940, M. 118
- Brass Quintets No. 1, 1961–2, M. 212, and No. 2, 1978, M.293
- Two Sonatas for guitar, Opp. 141–2
- Music with Horn, Op 148 (1981)
- Five Intermezzi for guitar, Op. 149
- Sonata for Trombone and Piano, Op 172a (1987)

Commercial recordings of his symphonies by Owain Arwel Hughes are still available, as are recordings of his Ten Preludes for Sinfonietta (1986–1991), string quartets, chamber concertos, and some other works. His choral or brass music, or his wind Notturno from 1940 may be performed more often than his works for full or chamber orchestra.

Private tapes exist of performances of Holmboe's music; these were made by Fritz Mahler, Nikolai Malko, among others.

== Bibliography ==
- Holmboe wrote several books, including Danish Street Cries: A Study of Their Musical Structure and a Complete Edition of Tunes with Words Collected before 1960, translated by Anne Lockhart for Kragen, ISBN 87-980636-9-3, published 1988.
- Another is Experiencing Music. An English translation of this by Professor Paul Rapoport, formerly of McMaster University, published by Toccata Press in 1991 has ISBN 0-907689-16-7 in its paperback release.
