= Melby Windmill =

Smock mill in Denmark

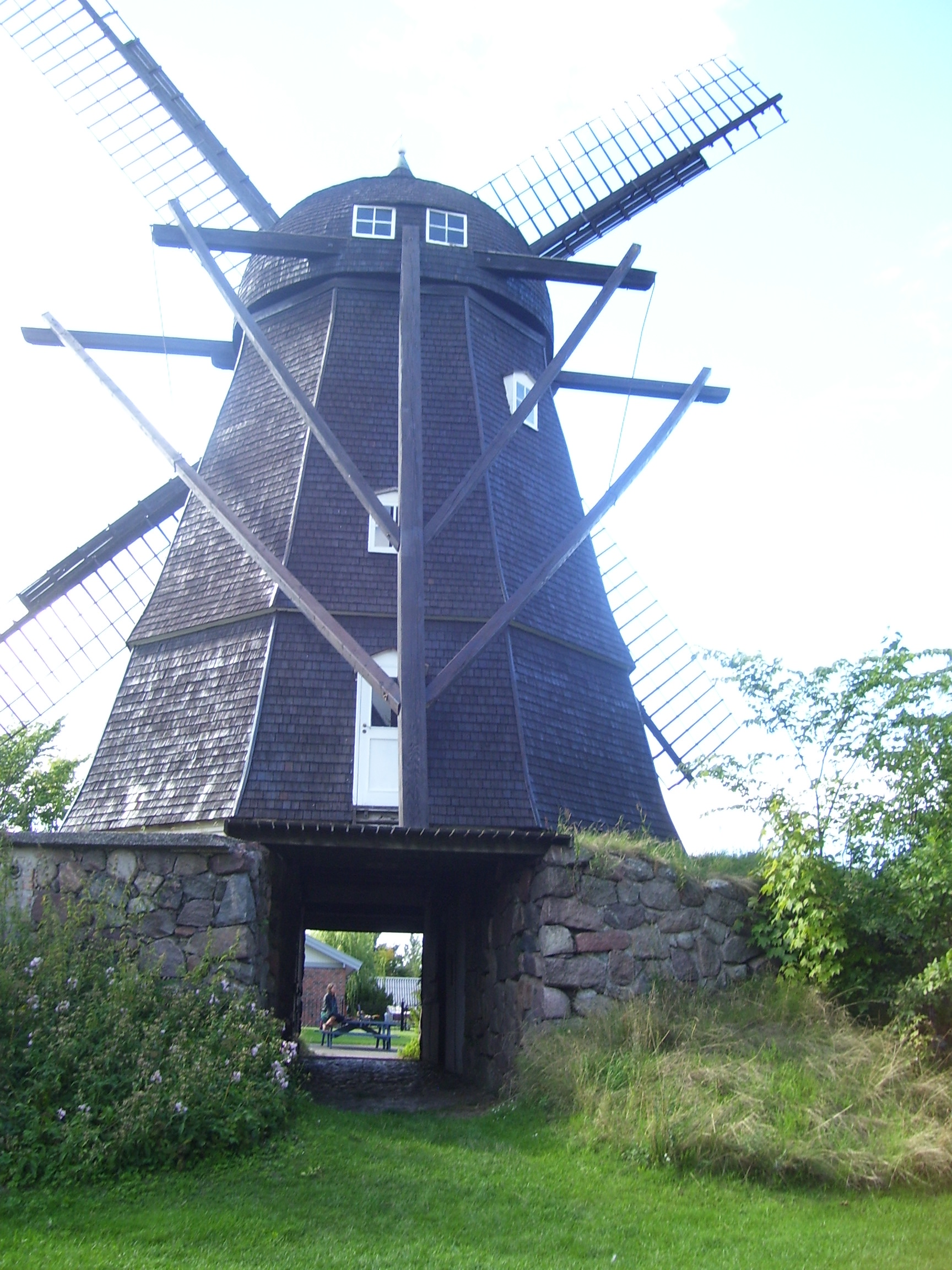
- Interactive map of Melby Windmill

Origin
- Mill name: Melby Windmill
- Mill location: Melby, Denmark
- Coordinates: 55°59′46″N 11°57′59″E
- Year built: 1878

Information
- Purpose: Corn mill and sawmill
- Type: Smock mill
- Storeys: Three storey smock
- Base storeys: Single storey base
- Smock sides: Eight sides
- No. of sails: Four sails
- Type of sails: Common Sails
- Winding: Tailpole

Melby Windmill (Danish: Melby Mølle) is a smock mill located at Melby, Halsnæs Municipality, North Zealand, some 60 kilometres (37 mi) north west of Copenhagen, Denmark.

== History ==
The windmill was built in 1878 for Hans Petersen, a sailor born in 1846 at Sjællands Odde. He operated it and a bakery until 1907. It has later been used as a sawmill. It was taken out of service in 1946 after the tailpole had been destroyed in a storm.

== Description ==
The windmill consists of an octagonal tower clad in shingles and topped by an ogee cap. The cap carries the four Common sails. It is winded by a tailpole. The mill stands on a stone case, which has an underpass for wagons.

== Today ==
The windmill is owned by Halsnæs Municipality. It has been restored, but not to working order. It is open to visitors. A key can be obtained in one of the neighbouring houses.

== See also ==
- List of windmills in Denmark
- Ramløse Windmill
- Hørsholm Windmill
