= Institute for the Blind, Copenhagen =

Institute for the Blind
- Blindeinstituttet
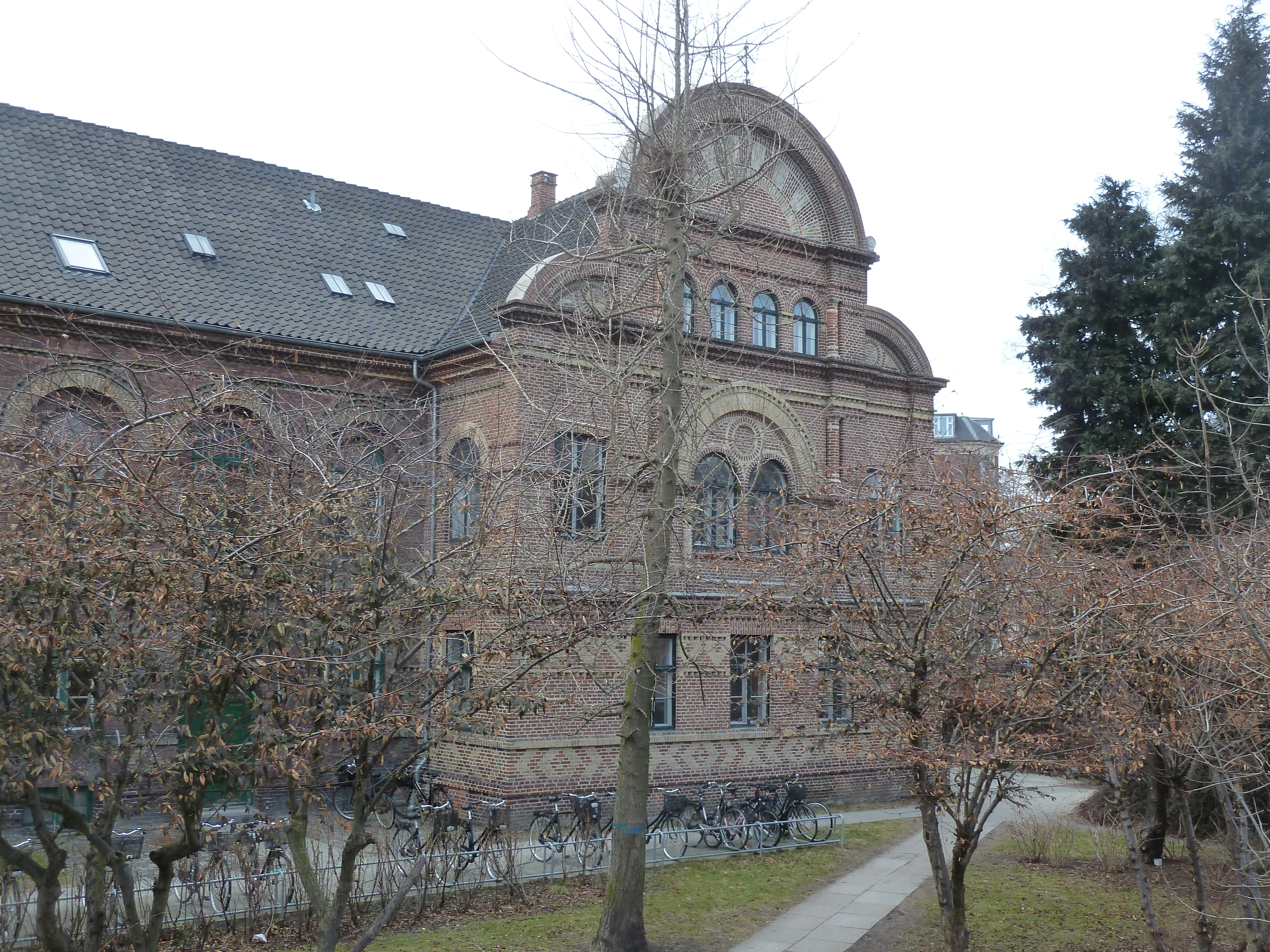
- Interactive map of the Institute for the Blind area

General information
- Architectural style: Historicism
- Location: Copenhagen, Denmark
- Coordinates: 55°41′45.7″N 12°35′15.6″E
- Completed: 1858
- Owner: Copenhagen Municipality

Design and construction
- Architect: Ferdinand Meldahl

The (Royal) Institute for the Blind (Danish: Blindeinstituttet) is a listed, Historicist building on Kastelsvej in the Østerbro district of Copenhagen, Denmark. Built in two stages in 1858 and 1880 to a design by Ferdinand Meldahl, it was the first special school for blind students in Denmark and was listed in 1977. The institution relocated to new premises in Hellerup in the 1960s and is now known as the Danish Institute for the Blind and Partially Sighted . The Østerbro building is now home to Copenhagen Municipality's Children's Centre.

== History ==
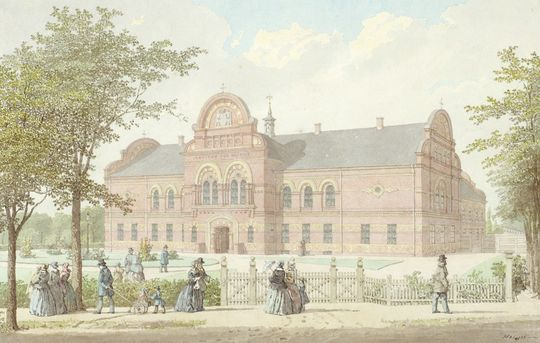
The Institute for the Blind in 1858, watercolour by H.G.F. Holm

The first Institute for the Blind was established by the Order of the Chain (Danish: Kjædeordenen)) on 10 June 1811 on Kastelsvej in Østerbro in 1857-58: Known as the Royal Institute for the Blind, it was ceded to the Danish State when it was completed. The building was one of the first civilian brick buildings to be constructed outside Copenhagen's old East Rampart when the city's fortifications were decommissioned in the 1850s. It was built next to the Institute for the Deaf which had already been completed on the glacis in front of Kastellet in 1838. The Institute for the Deaf had been built as an arrowhead-shaped revelin which could easily be converted into a defensive structure in the event of a hostile attack. Ferdinand Meldahl was charged with the design of the building. Construction began in 1857 and was completed in 1858. The three-winged complex had room for 60 students, 30 boys and 30 girls, each housed in their lateral wing. The main wing contained various workshops and activity rooms. The institution opened in 1858 with 25 students and with J. Moldenhawer as its first principal.

The building was expanded with a new rear wing in 1880. Rooms for 40 new students were created in the main wing while most of the workshops and activity rooms were moved to the new wing.

A new institution was built in the 1960s in Hellerup's Ryvangen neighbourhood. The foundation stone was set on 25 May 1966.

== Architecture ==
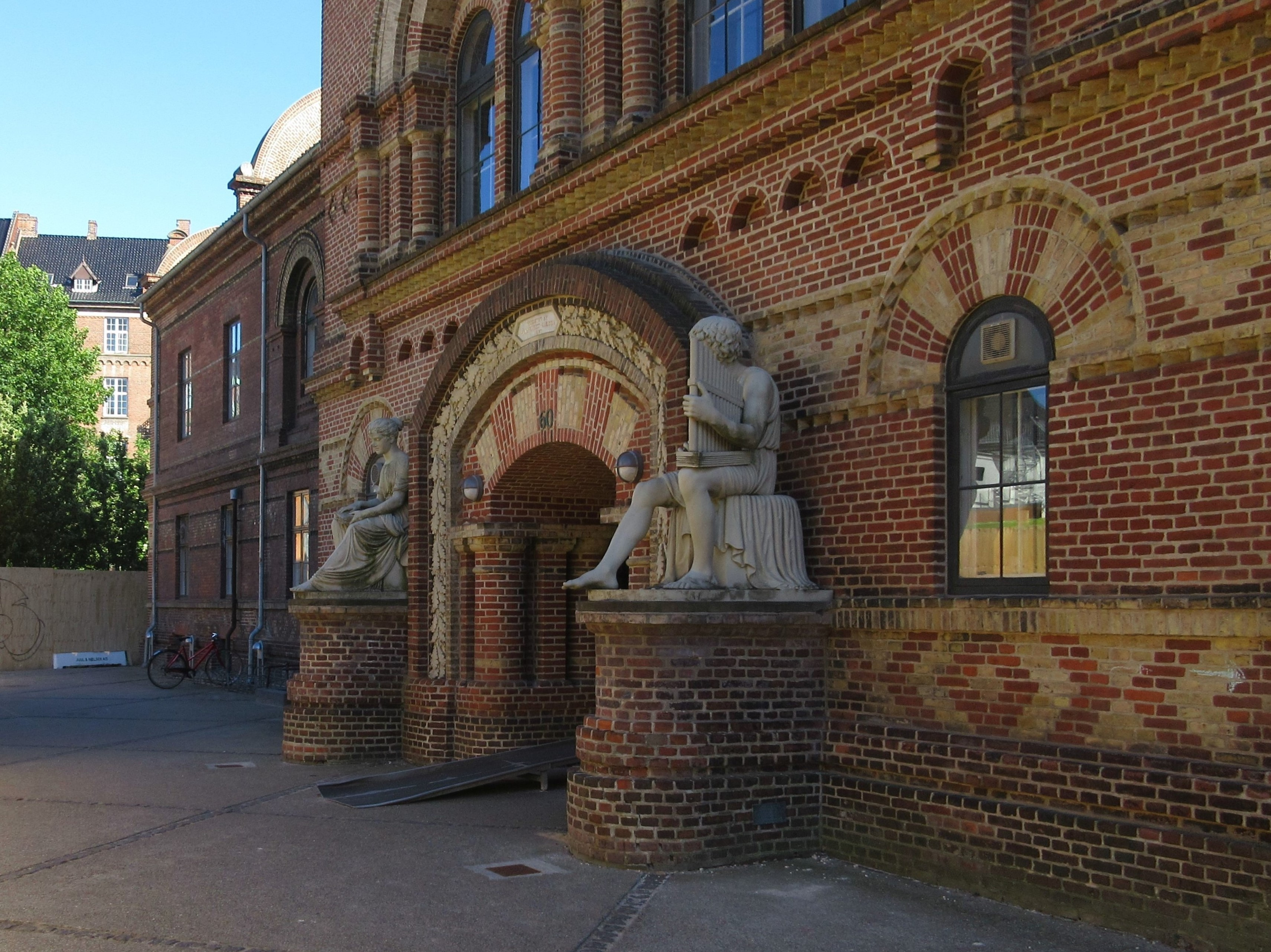
The main entrance with the two statues

The building is designed in a Historicist style which combines influence from Venetian Renaissance architecture such as San Zaccaria in Venice with inspiration from Danish buildings such as Hesselagergård.

The four-winged complex is built in red brick and has a grey tile roof. The two-storey main wing faces Kastelsvej to the northeast. The younger southwest-facing rear wing is attached to the two lateral wings by a couple of low, narrow connectors. The front and rear wings feature median ricilits, the front wing on both sides, all three of which are tipped by rounded pediments.

The main entrance is located in the central axis of the main wing and is surrounded by a low portal with columns and lesenes. The portal is flanked by two zinc statues by Peter Daniel depicting a blind boys and a blind girl.

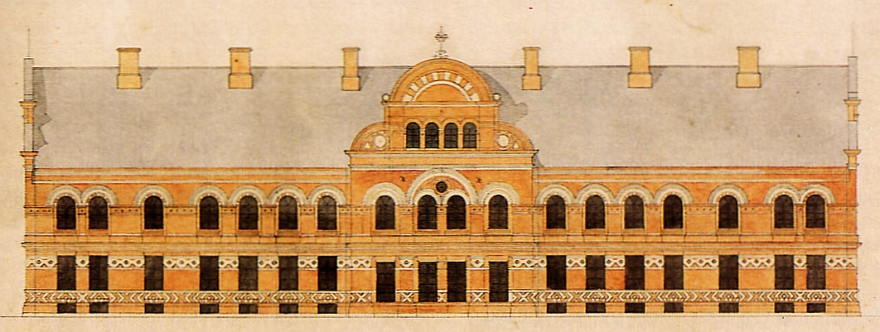
The 1880 wingGardens

== See also ==
- Blindness and education
