= Melbury =

Melbury may refer to:

== Dorset, England ==
- Melbury Abbas, village and civil parish in north Dorset, between Shaftesbury and Blandford Forum on the edge of Cranborne Chase
- Melbury Bubb, small village and civil parish in Dorset, approximately 7 miles south of the town of Sherborne
- Melbury Down, area of downland in northern Dorset
- Melbury Hill and summit Melbury Beacon is a prominent hill, 263 metres high, on the North Dorset Downs above the village of Melbury Abbas
- Melbury House in Melbury Sampford near Evershot, Dorset, the seat of the Strangways family of Dorset since 1500
- Melbury Osmond, village and civil parish in the county of Dorset in southern England
- Melbury Sampford, ditto

== Melbury Road, Holland Park, London ==
Melbury Road includes a number of houses of historic interest, some former homes of the Holland Park Circle of Victorian era artists:

- 2b Melbury Road, Grade II listed house built in 1877 by Sir John Belcher
- 8 Melbury Road, Queen Anne-style house by architect Richard Norman Shaw
- 18 Melbury Road, former home and studio of the Pre-Raphaelite painter William Holman Hunt
- 29 Melbury Road, or The Tower House, a late-Victorian townhouse built by the architect and designer William Burges as his home
- 31 Melbury Road, or Woodland House, Queen Anne-style House by architect Richard Norman Shaw

== Fiction ==
- Melbury, a fictional London suburb in Random Harvest, a novel by James Hilton
- A small village in the novel The vanishing point, by Patricia Wentworth (1953)
- Lord Melbury, a character in "A Touch of Class", a 1975 episode of BBC sitcom Fawlty Towers

== See also ==
- Melby (disambiguation)
