= Lønstrup Mølle =

Smock mill in Lønstrup, Denmark

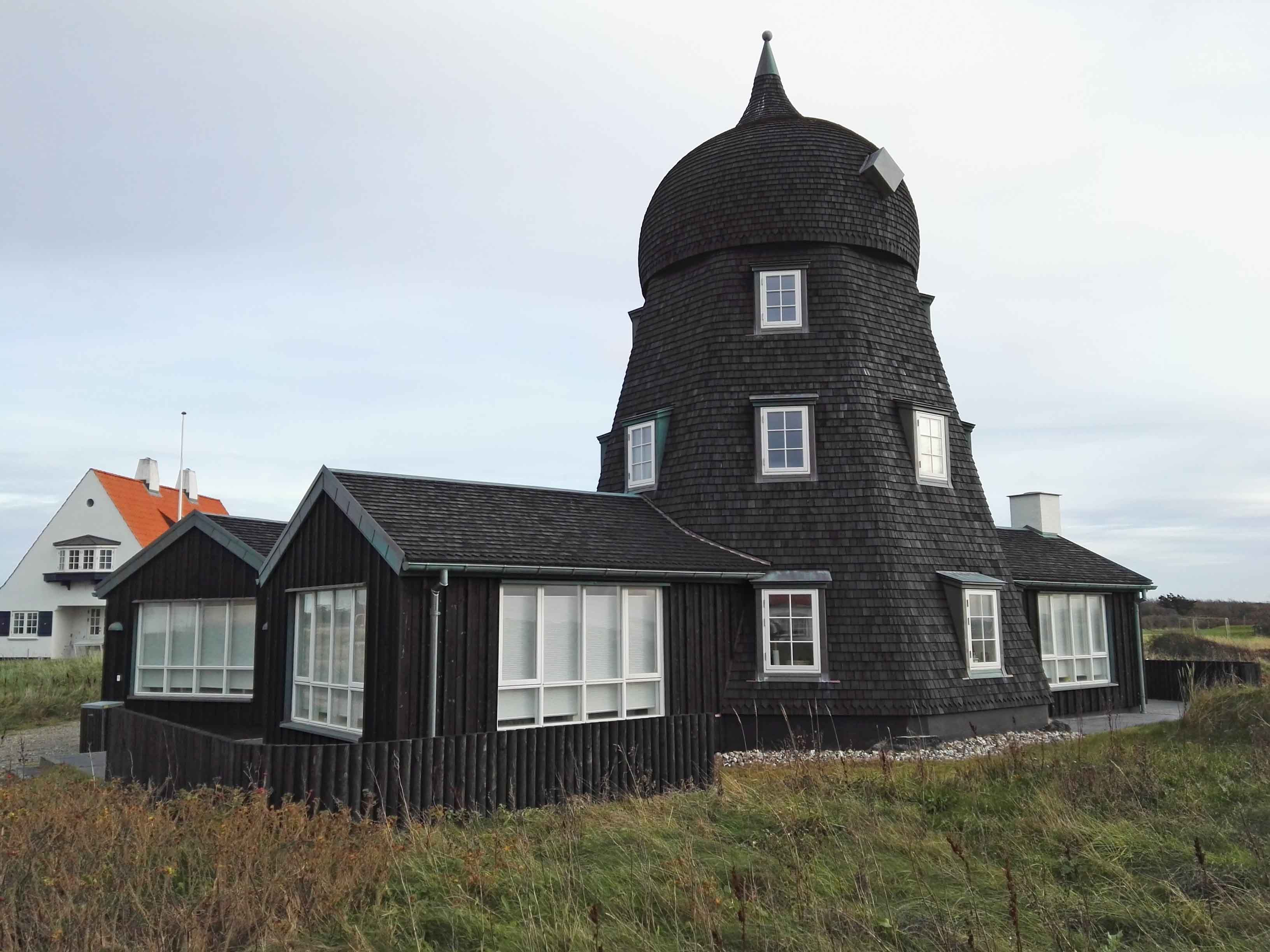
- Lønstrup Mølle
- Interactive map of Lønstrup Mølle

Origin
- Mill name: Lønstrup Mølle
- Mill location: Lønstrup, Denmark
- Coordinates: 57.4742°N 9.7996°E

Information
- Purpose: Corn mill
- Type: Smock mill
- Storeys: Two
- Base storeys: One
- Smock sides: Eight
- No. of sails: Four

Lønstrup Mølle is a former smock mill in Lønstrup on the west coast of North Jutlandic Island in the north-west of Denmark. It was decommissioned in the beginning of the 20th century and has been converted into a private home. The sails broke off in the 1990s.

== See also ==
List of windmills in Denmark
