= Ramløse Windmill =

Smock mill in Ramløse, Gribskov Municipality, North Zealand, Denmark

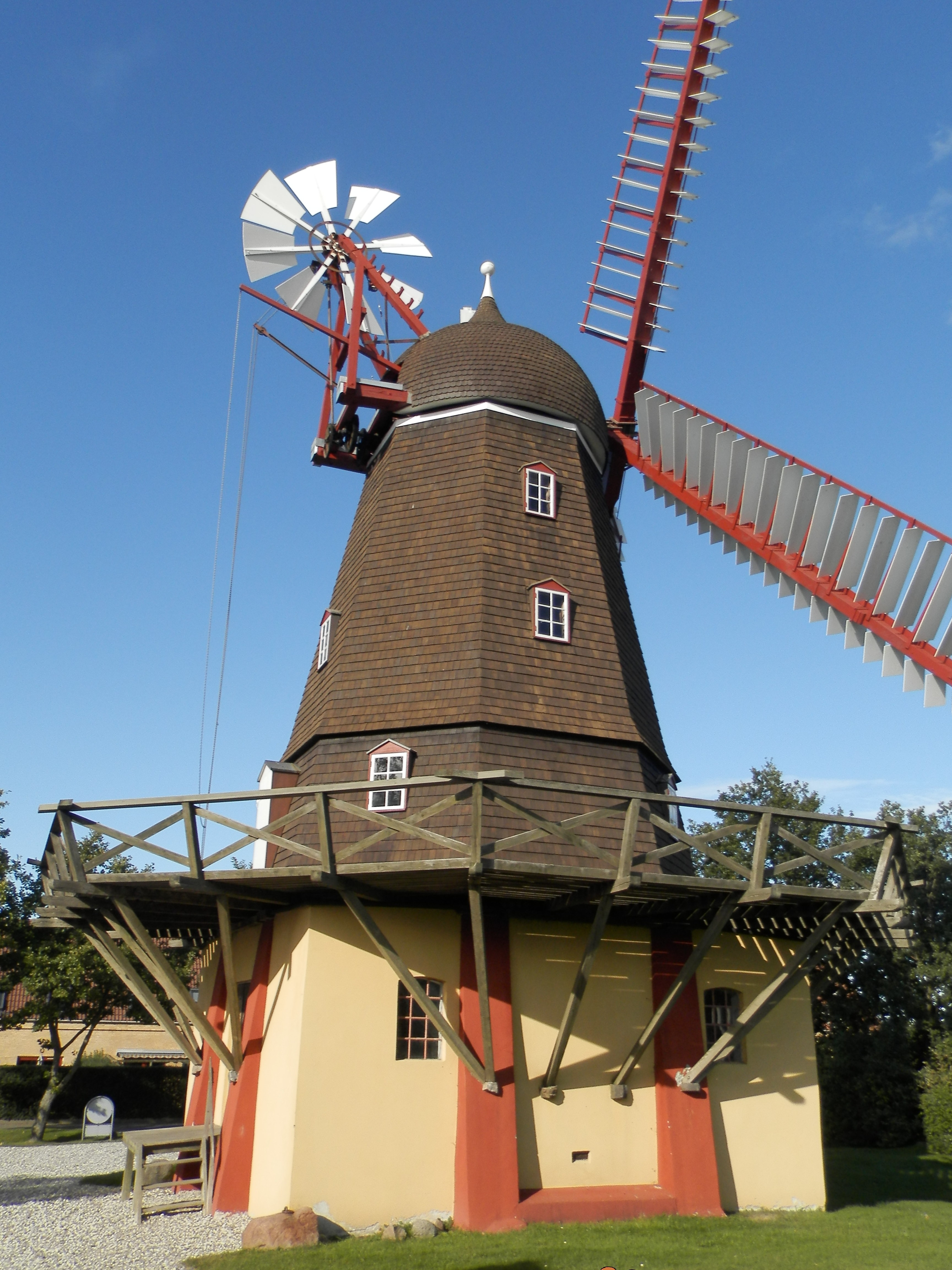

Origin
- Mill name: Ramløse Windmill
- Mill location: Ramløse, Denmark
- Coordinates: 56.015864°N 12.118872°E
- Year built: 1908

Information
- Purpose: Corn mill and sawmill
- Type: Smock mill
- Storeys: Three storey smock
- Base storeys: Single storey base
- Smock sides: Eight sides
- No. of sails: Four sails

Ramløse Windmill (Danish: Ramløse Mølle) is a smock mill located in the northeastern corner of Ramløse, Gribskov Municipality, North Zealand, some 60 kilometres (37 mi) north west of Copenhagen, Denmark. Built in 1908, it remained in service until 1937. The mill has been restored to working order and is operated by a group of local volunteers six times a year. One of the other buildings at the site, a former workshop, has been turned into a small museum which exhibits historic tools used by different trades. There is also a B&B and a café.

== History ==
The first smock mill at the site was built as a grain mill for Lars Jensen in 1882. The name of the owner's house, Møllebjerggård ("Mill Hill Farm"), predates the construction of the new mill, indicating that a post mill had stood at the site in the past. The mill was in 1894 sold to Niels Pedersen who also used it as a sawmill.

The mill was destroyed in a fire on 3 August 1908. The use of windmills had already started to decline in Denmark but a new mill was nonetheless built by millwright Jens Peter Jensen from Fredensborg. The new windmill had a steam engine which was replaced by a Diesel engine in 1920. Niels Pedersen's wife Julie also opened a bakery at the mill. The windmill was taken out of service in 1937 but the couple continued to run the sawmill and also established a production of packaging. The property was sold after Niels Pedersen's death in 1942. The mill fell into neglect but was restored at the initiative of local citizens in 1974. Helsinge Municipality purchased the property in 1979. The mill lost its cap and sails in a storm on 24 November 1981. It has been restored to working order by the mid 109+s.

== Description ==
The octagonal windmill consists of a three-storey tower standing on a brick case and topped by an ogee cap. The cap carries the four sails and has a fantail.

== Today ==
The windmill is owned by Gribskov Municipality. It is operated by a group of local volunteers six times a year. Next to the windmill is Håndværksmuseet ("The Museum of Crafts"), a small museum in an old workshop which exhibits old tools used by different trades such as coopers and coppersmiths. The site also includes a bed & breakfast and a café which serves coffee, tea and buns baked with flour from the mill.

== See also ==
- List of windmills in Denmark
