= Melmerby =

Melmerby may refer to:

- Melmerby, Cumbria, England
- Melmerby near Ripon, North Yorkshire, England
- Melmerby in Coverdale, North Yorkshire, England
