= Melby, Minnesota =

Unincorporated community in Minnesota, United States

Melby
- Unincorporated community
- Location within Minnesota Location within the United States
- Coordinates: 46°03′50″N 95°44′09″W
- Country: United States
- State: Minnesota
- County: Douglas
- Elevation: 1,270 ft (390 m)
- Time zone: UTC-6 (Central (CST))
  - Summer (DST): UTC-5 (CDT)
- Area code: 320
- GNIS feature ID: 647747

Melby is an unincorporated community in Douglas County, in the U.S. state of Minnesota.

== History ==
A post office called Melby was in operation from 1888 until 1978. Melby was platted in 1902.
