= Solrød Municipality =

Solrød Municipality Solrød Kommune (Danish)
- Municipality
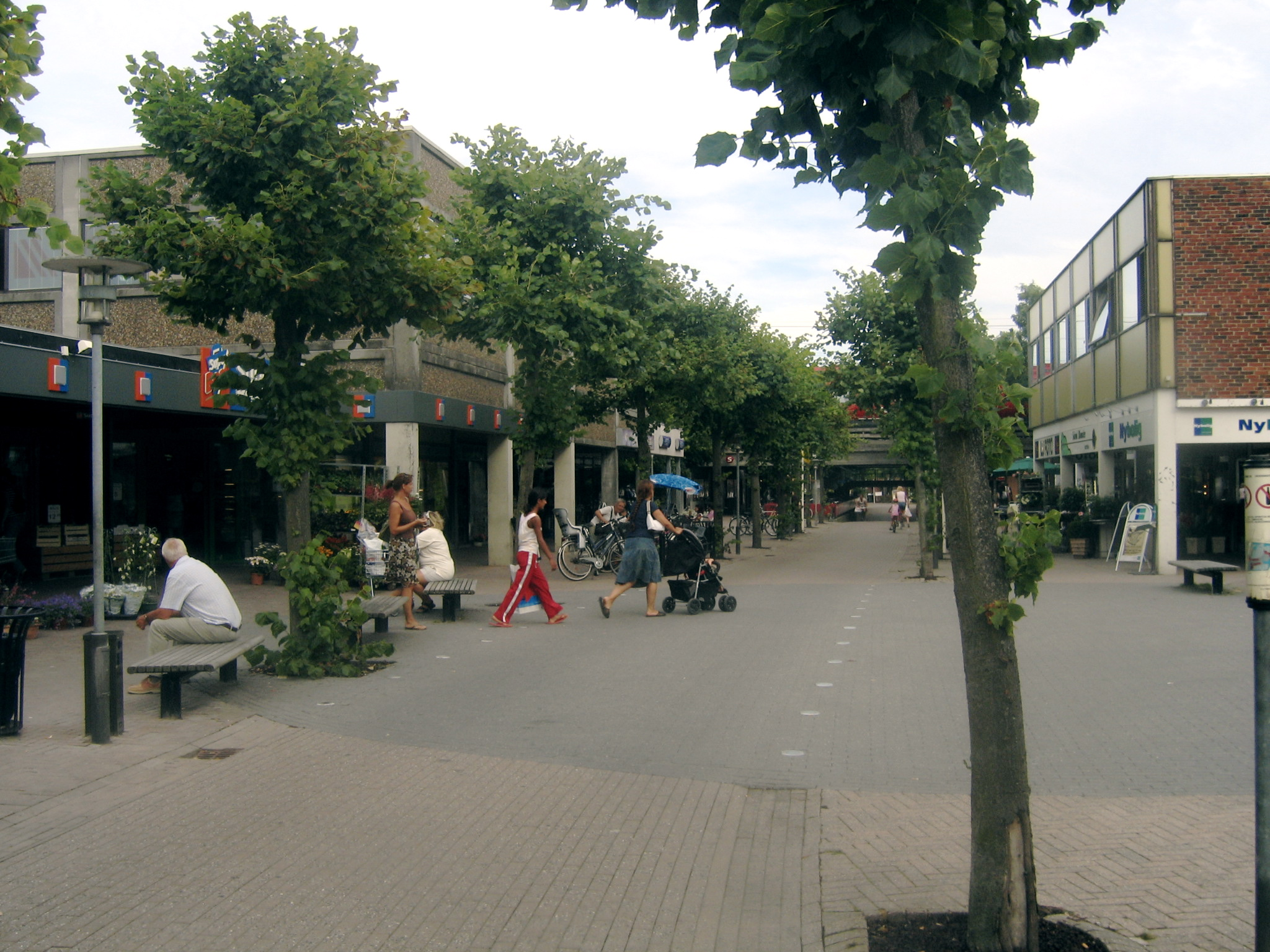
- Solrød Centre, home to the town hall, the local S-train station and many shops

- Coat of arms

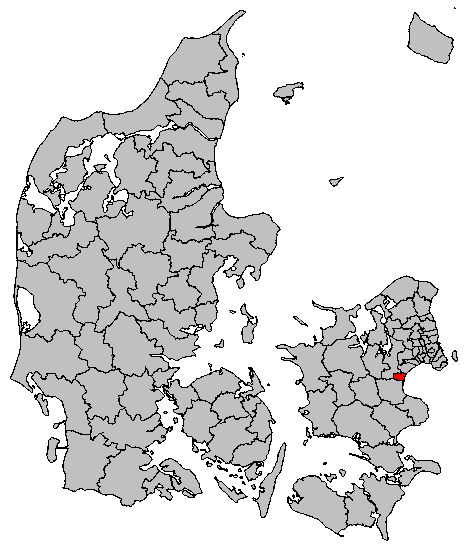
- Coordinates: 55°32′08″N 12°10′24″E
- Country: Denmark
- Region: Zealand
- Seat: Solrød Strand

Government
  - Mayor: Emil Blücher (I)

Area
  - Total: 40.0 km^{2} (15.4 sq mi)

Population (1 January 2026)
  - Total: 25,040
  - Density: 626/km^{2} (1,620/sq mi)
- Time zone: UTC+1 (CET)
  - Summer (DST): UTC+2 (CEST)
- Postal code: 2680
- Island: Zealand
- Municipal code: 269
- Website: www.solrod.dk

Solrød Municipality (Danish: Solrød Kommune) is a kommune in the Region Sjælland on the east coast of the island of Zealand in east Denmark. The municipality covers an area of 40 km^{2}, and has a total population of 25,040 (2026). Its mayor is Emil Blücher, a member of the Liberal Alliance political party. The municipal seat is Solrød Strand.

== Overview ==
Most of the population lives in an urbanized belt between the coast of Køge Bay and the E47 motorway, developed in the 1970s. The northern part of the belt is Solrød Stand; this is the site of the municipal council. The southern part is Jersie Strand. The coastal belt is connected by S-train to central Copenhagen to the north, and to the city of Køge to the south, with stations at Solrød Strand and Jersie Strand.

Further inland lies fertile farmland, dotted with the old villages of Karlstrup, Solrød, Jersie, Kirke Skensved, and Gammel Havdrup. The town of Havdrup has a station on the Little South railway line between Roskilde and Køge.

Neighboring municipalities are Greve to the north, Roskilde to the west, and Køge to the south. To the east is Køge Bay (Køge Bugt).

There are popular beaches along the Køge Bay coast, and the municipality is a popular summer house area. The area attracts both local day visitors and summer vacationers who are interested in boating, beaches and sunshine.

== History ==
The 2007 municipal reform left the boundaries of Solrød unchanged.

== Urban areas ==
There are four urban areas in the municipality:

#	Locality	Population
1	Solrød Strand	15.159
2	Havdrup	3.992
3	Jersie	530
4	Solrød	476

and

- Karlstrup

== Politics ==
=== Municipal council ===
Solrød's municipal council consists of 19 members, elected every four years.

Below are the municipal councils elected since the Municipal Reform of 2007.

Election	Party											Total seats	Turnout	Elected mayor
Election	A	B	C	D	F	G	I	L	O	V	Ø	Total seats	Turnout	Elected mayor
2005	3		1	1	1			1	1	7		15	69.2%	Niels Hörup (V)
2009	4		1	1	2			2	1	8		19	68.0%	Niels Hörup (V)
2013	3		2		1	2	1	1	1	8		19	76.8%	Niels Hörup (V)
2017	4	1	1		1	1	1	1	1	8		19	75.1%	Niels Hörup (V)
2021	4		3				3	1	1	4	3	19	73.35%	Emil Blücher (I)
Data from Kmdvalg.dk 2005, 2009, 2013 and 2017
