= Majbølle Mølle =

Smock mill in Denmark

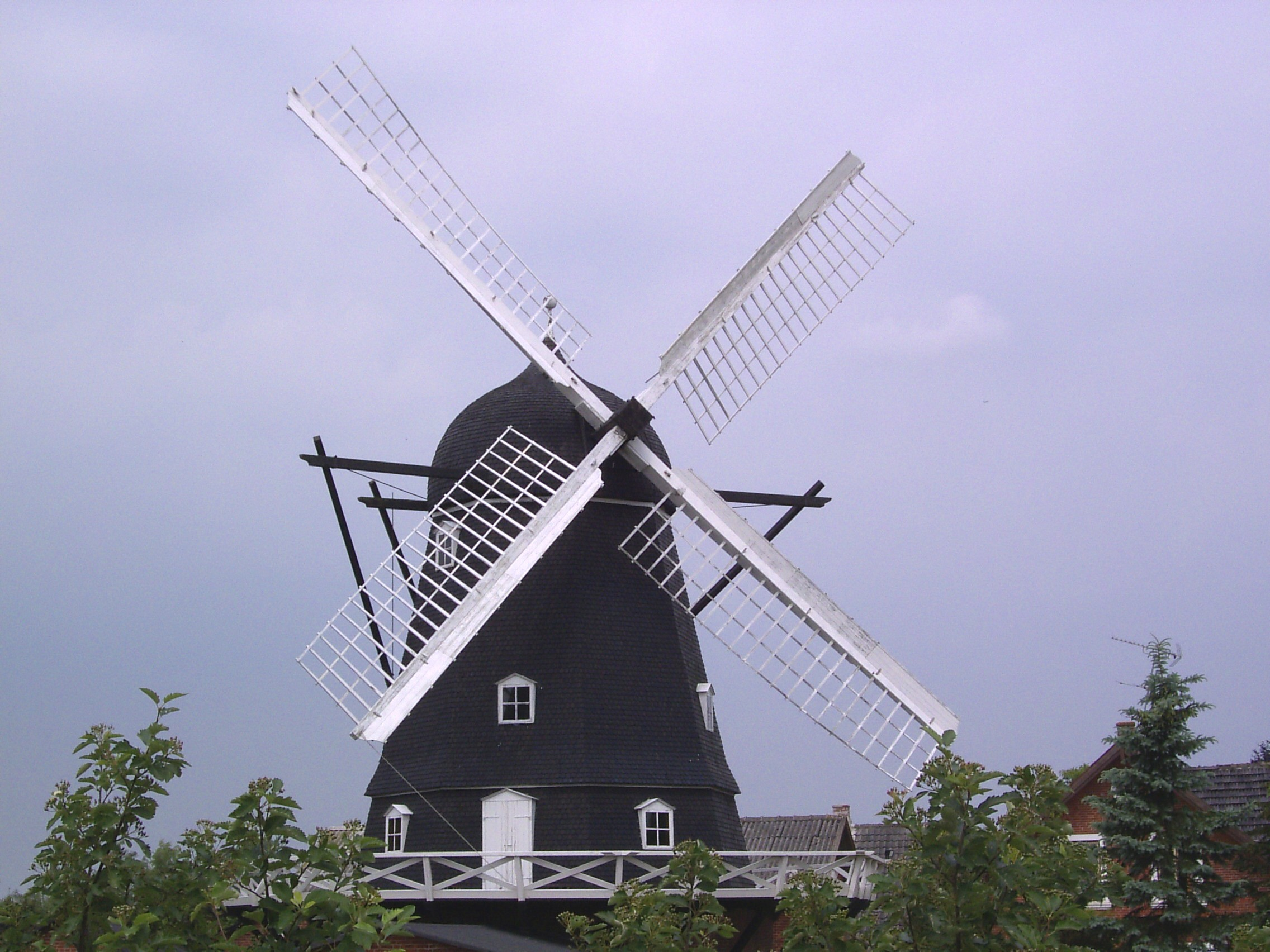
- Majbølle Mølle, July 2006
- Interactive map of Majbølle Mølle

Origin
- Mill name: Majbølle Mølle
- Mill location: Majbølle, Denmark
- Coordinates: 54.8278°N 11.7385°E
- Operator: Majbølle Møllelaug
- Year built: 1896

Information
- Purpose: Corn mill
- Type: Smock mill
- Base storeys: Two-storey base
- Smock sides: Eight sides
- No. of sails: Four sails
- Type of sails: Common sails
- Winding: Tailpole and winch
- Auxiliary power: Petrol engine, electric motor

Majbølle Mølle is a smock mill at Majbølle, Denmark which was built in 1896 and has been restored to working order.

== History ==
The first mention of a mill on this site was in 1612, when King Christian IV imposed an extra tax on mills. The mill does not appear on tax records between 1625 and 1664. In 1664, a mill was in the ownership of a Mr Simon, a ferryman of Guldborg. The millers in the period 1688–1710 were tenants of Mr Simon, or of his children. In 1711, the mill was in the ownership of Christen Outte, passing at his death to his son Mathias.

In 1760, a new post mill was built for Johan Tønnesen, who was miller until 1804. In that year, the mill was sold to Christen Andersen, who had been apprenticed at a mill in Radsted. The mill passed to his son Anders in 1835, and then to his son, Christen Andreas in 1875. In 1895, the post mill was demolished.

In 1896, a new smock mill was built by millwright Niels Clausen of Toreby. A 14 horsepower (10 kW) Holeby petrol engine was installed as auxiliary power in 1907. Christen Andreas Andersen died in 1918. He had not married and had no children, but his cousin Sidsel Christophersen Kølle had married Jens Martin Rasmussen, who was apprenticed in Majbølle Mølle. In 1936, a mill driven by an electric motor was installed. This was made by Brd. Clausen of Toresby, the sons of the millwright who built Majbølle Mølle. The mill had passed to Jens Martin Rasmussen, who retired in 1938. His son Martin Rasmussen was left in charge of the mill. In 1942, the mill lost a sail in a storm when the brake was applied too fiercely. As repairs would have been too costly, the mill was worked by the auxiliary power sources from then. In 1961, the mill passed to Gunnar Rasmussen, who worked it until 1981.

In the spring of 1982, Gunnar Rasmussen asked the parish priest, Lars Graff Nielsen, whether there was any way that the mill could be preserved. After an inspection of the mill in May 1982, it was recommended that the mill should be preserved. Approval was granted in August 1982, but an independent body had to be formed before grants could be obtained for the restoration. The Majbølle Møllelaug (English: Majbølle Miller's Guild) was formed on 2 December 1982. In the spring on 1983, the Majbølle Møllelaug began the process of obtaining grants for the restoration. Many people in the Sakskøbing municipality contributed donations. Restoration of Majbølle Mølle started on 5 September 1983. On 3 November 1983, the cap and windshaft were lifted off the mill by a mobile crane. The cap was lifted onto the restored smock on 27 September 1984. A topping out ceremony was held, at which it was announced that the Queen had granted DKK 20,000 towards the cost of the restoration. The money came from the Fondet til Fædrelandets Vel.

During 1985, further fundraising was carried out so that the interior could be restored. It was estimated that restoration had cost DKK 385,000, of which the Sakskøbing municipality had given DKK 50,000 and private citizens in the municipality had given a similar amount. The restoration of the interior began in the autumn of 1986. This cost DKK 130,000, with a further DKK 90,000 for new sails. The restoration of the mill was completed in 1988.

The restored mill was officially opened by Prince Henrik, who also opened the Guldborgsund Tunnel on the E47 the same day. Early in 2007, the mill was tailwinded, and some damage was done to the sails. An inspection revealed that the cap needed repair as it was leaking and the brake wheel was rotten. Repairs cost DKK 50,000. Donations were received from a number of sources towards the cost.

== Description ==
Majbølle Mølle is a three-storey smock mill on a two-storey base. There is a stage at second-floor level. The smock is clad in shingles. The ogee cap carries four Common sails. It is winded by a tailpole and winch.

== Millers ==
Post mill

- Christen Outte (1711–?)
- Mathias Outte
- Johan Tønnesen (1760–1804)
- Christen Andersen (1804–35)
- Anders Andersen (1835–75)
- Christen Andreas Andersen (1875–95)

Smock mill

- Christen Andreas Andersen (1896–1918)
- Jans Martin Rasmussen (1918–38)
- Martin Rasmussen (1938–61)
- Gunnar Rasmussen (1961–81)

Sources for above:-
