= Hørsholm Windmill =

Smock mill in Hørsholm

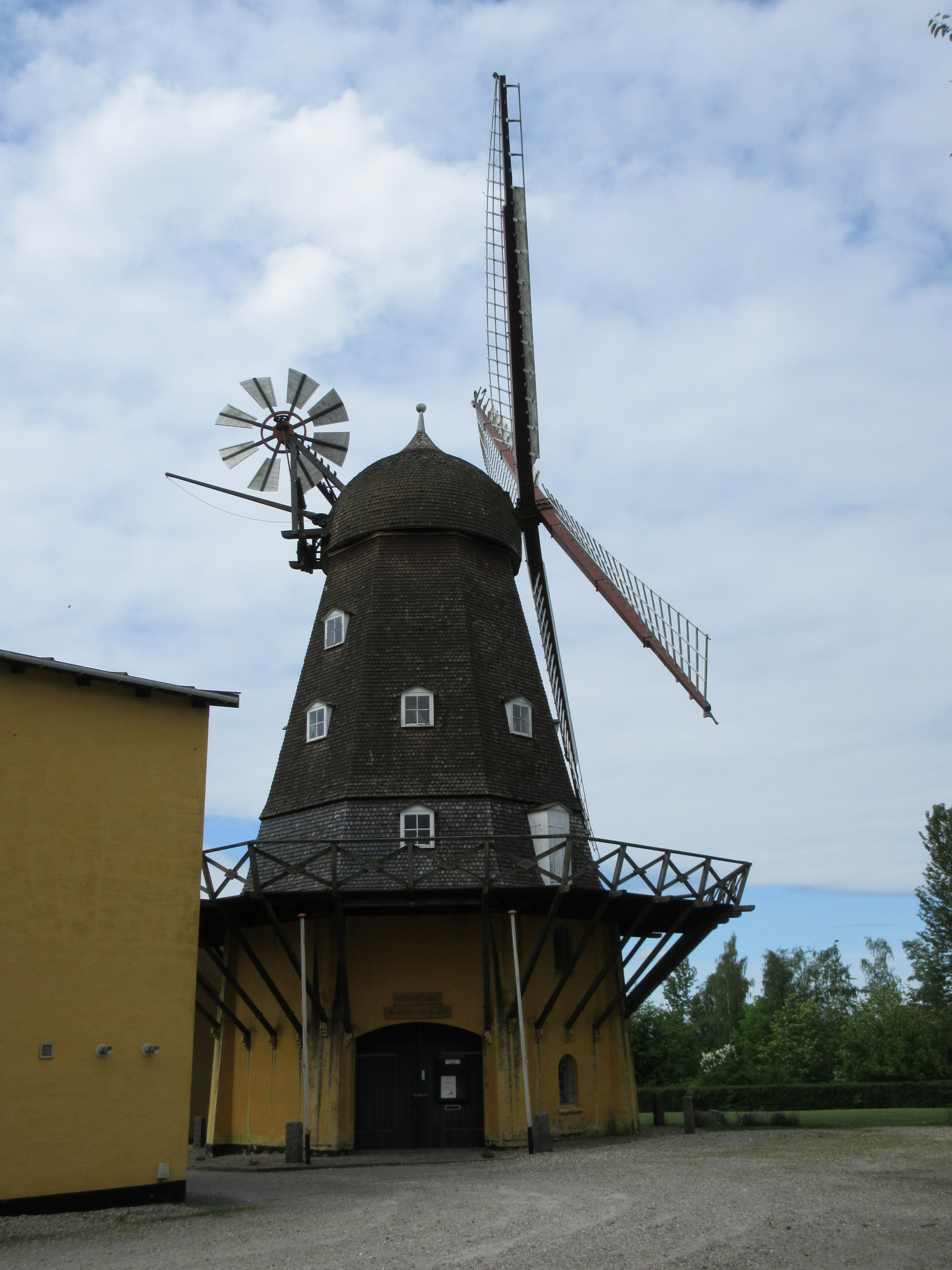
- Interactive map of Hørsholm Windmill

Origin
- Mill name: Hørsholm Windmill
- Mill location: Hørsholm, Denmark
- Coordinates: 55°59′46″N 11°57′59″E
- Year built: 1892

Information
- Purpose: Corn mill
- Type: Smock mill
- Storeys: Three storey smock
- Base storeys: Single storey base
- Smock sides: Eight sides
- No. of sails: Four sails
- Type of sails: Common Sails

Hørsholm Windmill (Danish: Hørsholm Mølle) is a smock mill located in Hørsholm to the north of Copenhagen, Denmark. The site also comprises two storage buildings. The complex is now home to a small museum of old crafts.

== History ==
The windmill was constructed in 1890–91 by mill builder Martin Johansen. ItWind power was already falling out of favour and it was supplemented by a steam engine in 1895 and by a diesel engine from 1914. One large and two small electrical engines were installed in about 1940 and the complex was from then on used for production of chicken feed. It was decommissioned in the 1970s.

== Description ==
The windmill consists of an octagonal tower clad in shingles and topped by an ogee cap. The cap carries the four Common sails. It is winded by a fantail. The mill stands on a dressed brick case, which has an underpass for wagons.

== Today ==
The windmill is now home to a small museum of traditional crafts. It was opened by the Association of Craftsmen in Copenhagen. The premises are also rented out for exhibitions and other events.

== See also ==
- List of windmills in Denmark
