= Ramløse =

- Town
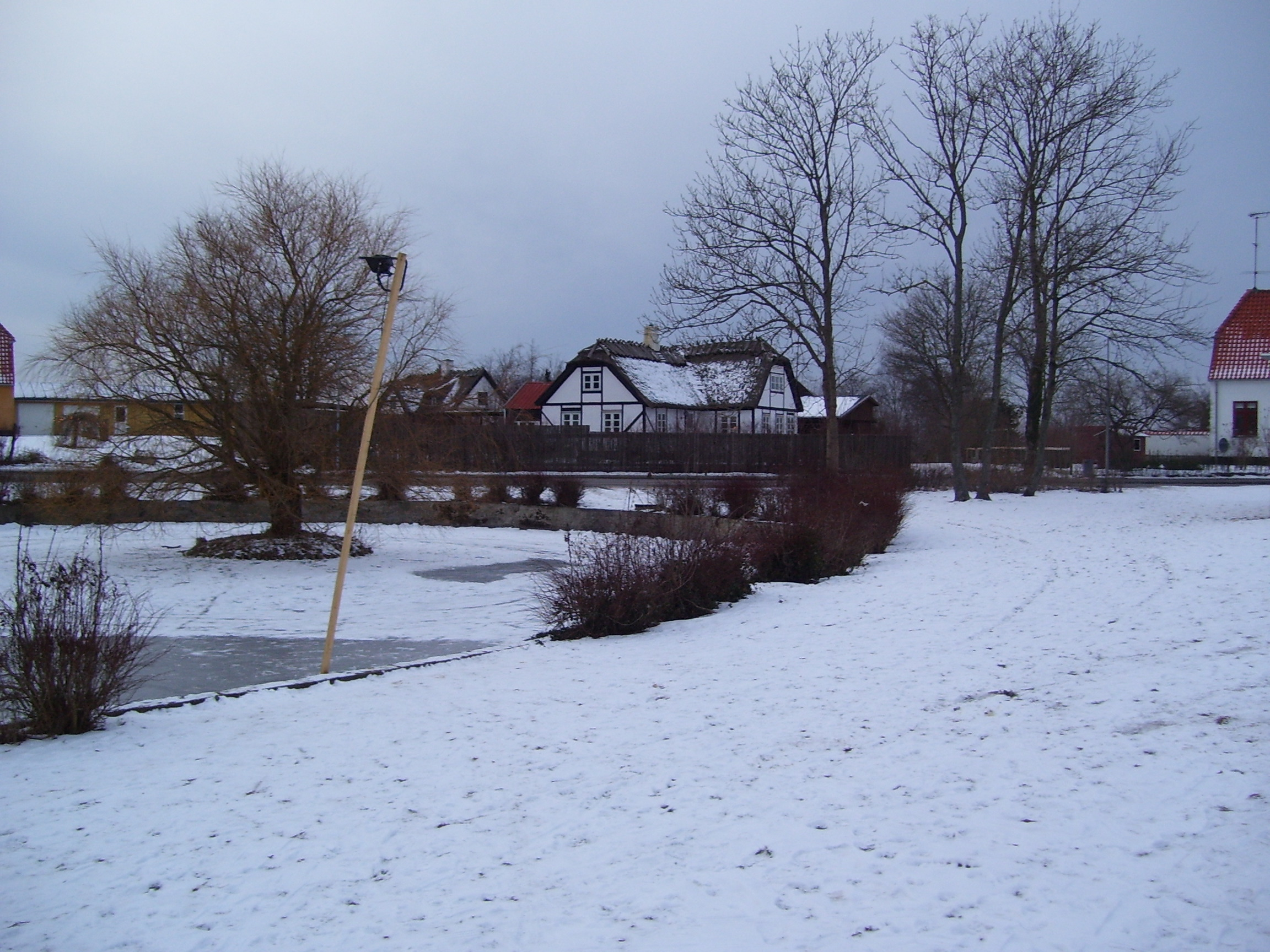

- Location in Denmark Ramløse (Capital Region)
- Coordinates: 56°1′N 12°7′E
- Country: Denmark
- Region: Capital Region
- Municipality: Gribskov

Area
  - Urban: 1.06 km^{2} (0.41 sq mi)

Population (2026)
  - Urban: 1,551
  - Urban density: 1,460/km^{2} (3,790/sq mi)
- Time zone: UTC+1 (CET)
  - Summer (DST): UTC+2 (CEST)
- Postal code: 3200 Helsinge

Ramløse is a town and parish located on the northeast shore of Lake Arresø in Gribskov Municipality, North Zealand, some 50 km north of Copenhagen, Denmark. Local landmarks include Ramløse Church and Ramløse Windmill.

== History ==
The name Ramløse means "marshy pastures or meadow". In the Middle Ages, Ramløse consisted of 29 farms, making it one of the largest villages in Frederiksborg County. Most of the parish belonged to Tamløsegård, a fortified farm under the biscopic in Roskilde. Bishop Rico, who had sided with Eric Lam in the battle for the Danish throne, was murdered by Oluf Haraldsen at Tamløsegård in 1139. After the Reformation in 1556, Ramløsegård was confiscated by the Crown. The king used the estate as a private hunting ground.

In the 17th century, Ramløse, partly due to overgrazing, was hit hard by drifting sands like other parts of Zealand's north coast. This led to a long period of recession. An rytterskole opened in the village in 1731. In the middle of the 19th century, Ramløse finally saw better times with the opening of a new road to Helsinge. A community house ("forsamlingshus") opened in 1893 and a new school was built in 1937.

The village grew when former farmland was sold off in lots and redeveloped with single family detached housing in the 1960s. This took especially place in the area Søkrogen to the south of the village on land that previously belonged to the farms Møllehavegård, Eghøj and Arresøgård.

== Description ==
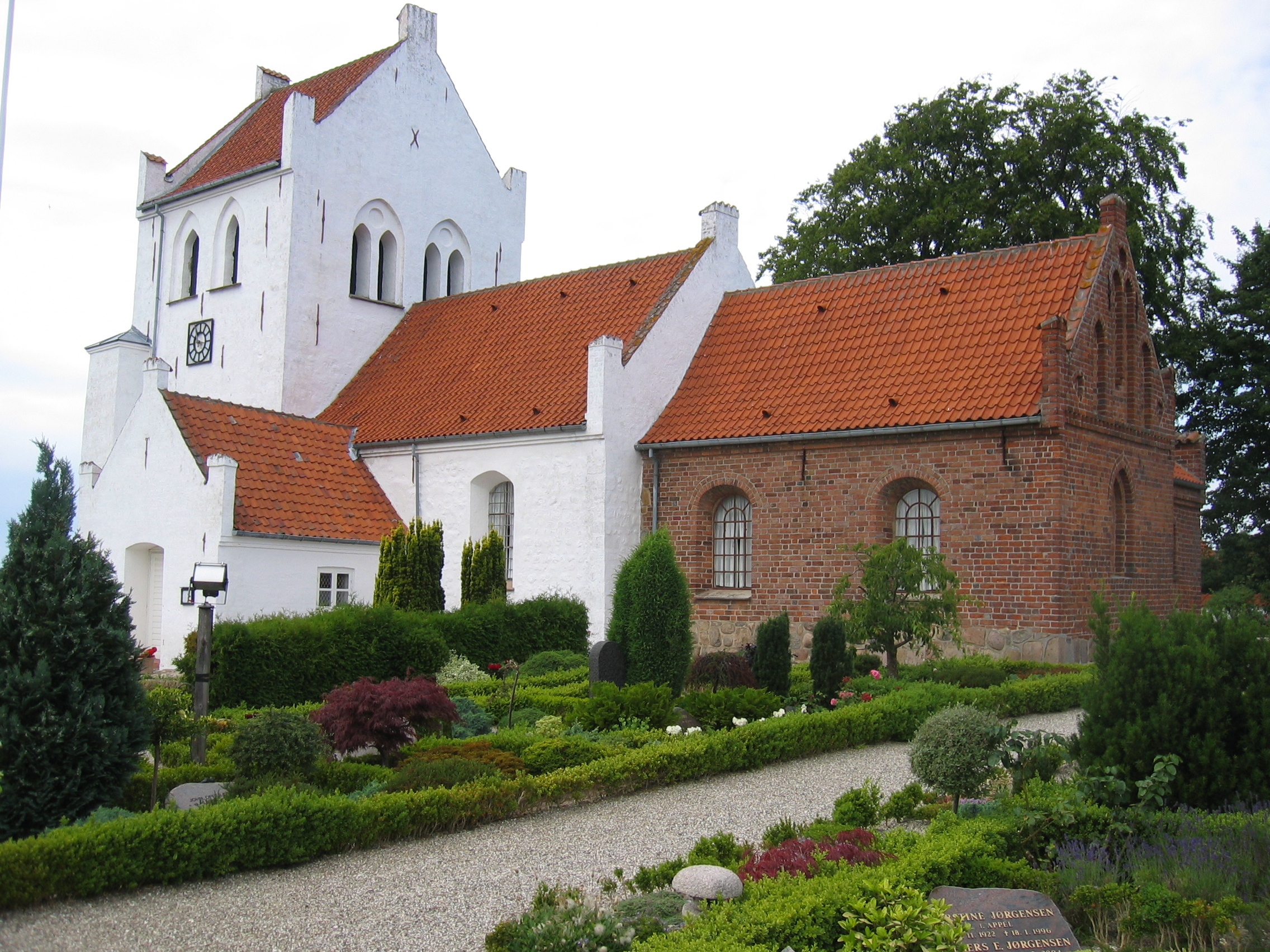
Ramløse Church

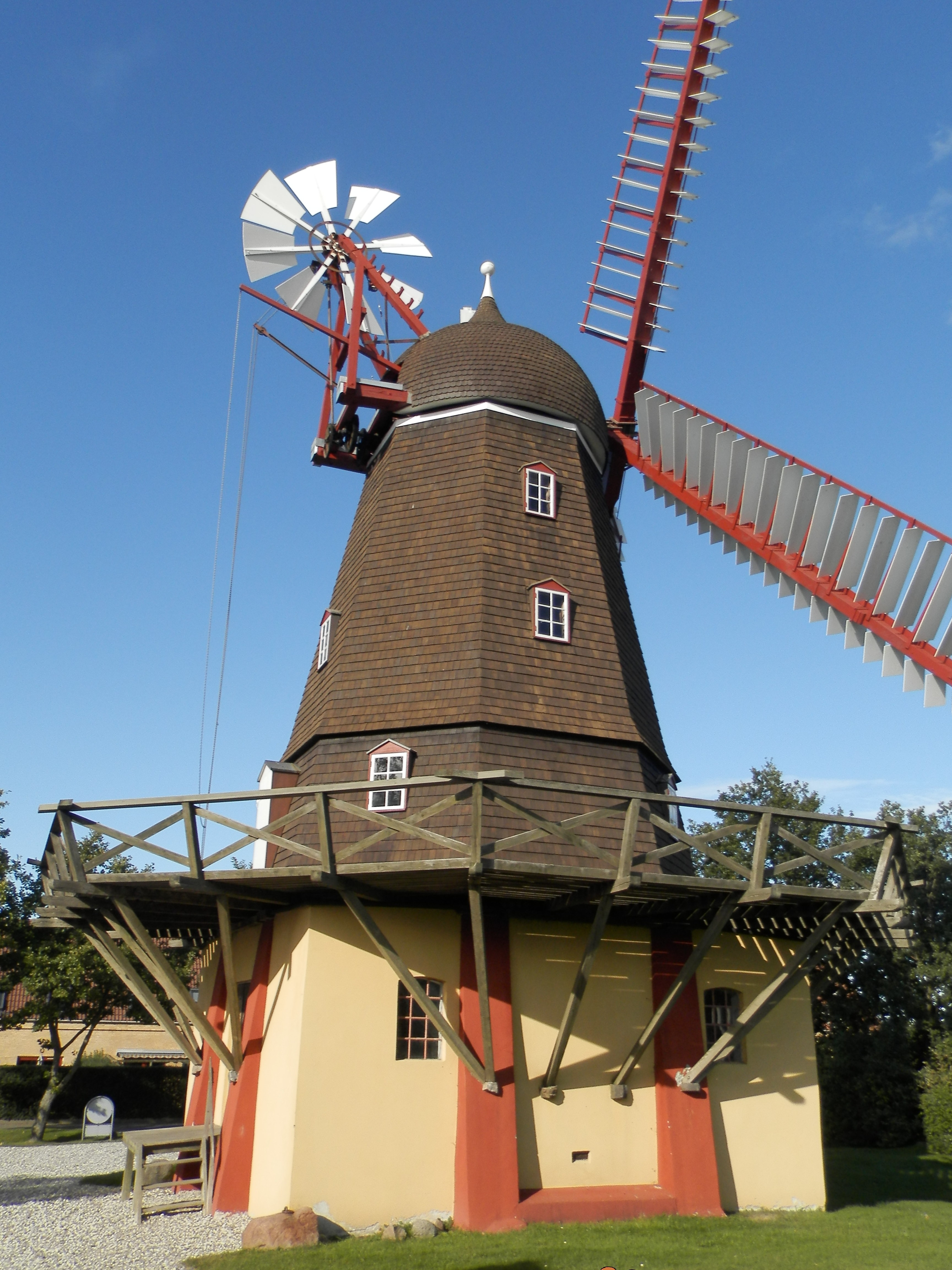
Ramløse Windmill

Ramløse Church dates from the 12th century. The Baroque-style pulpit is from 1635 and features reliefs depicting Jesus and his apostles. The Altarpiece was painted by Christen Købke and depicts Jesus and Nicodemus.

Ramløse Windmill is a smock mill from 1908. It has been restored to working order and is operated by a group of local volunteers on special occasions. One of the associated buildings contain a small museum which exhibits historic tools used by different trades. There is also a B&B and a café.

Facilities in Ramløse include a primary school (grade 0–7) and a sports hall.

== Surroundings ==
Immediately to the east of Ramløse is the burial mound Hyldehøj. To the northwest of Ramløse is an area called Ramløse Sand, part of a larger area known as Sandet ("The Sand"). It consists of raised seabed and was once used for grazing by the farmers in Ramløse.

== Notable people ==
- Vagn Holmboe (1909–1996) a Danish a neo-classical composer and teacher; in 1940 he set up a farm at Lake Arresø and remained there
- Anders Bircow (born 1951) a Danish actor and comedian, went to school in Ramløse
