= Frilandsmuseet =

Coordinates: 55.7861°N 12.4923°E

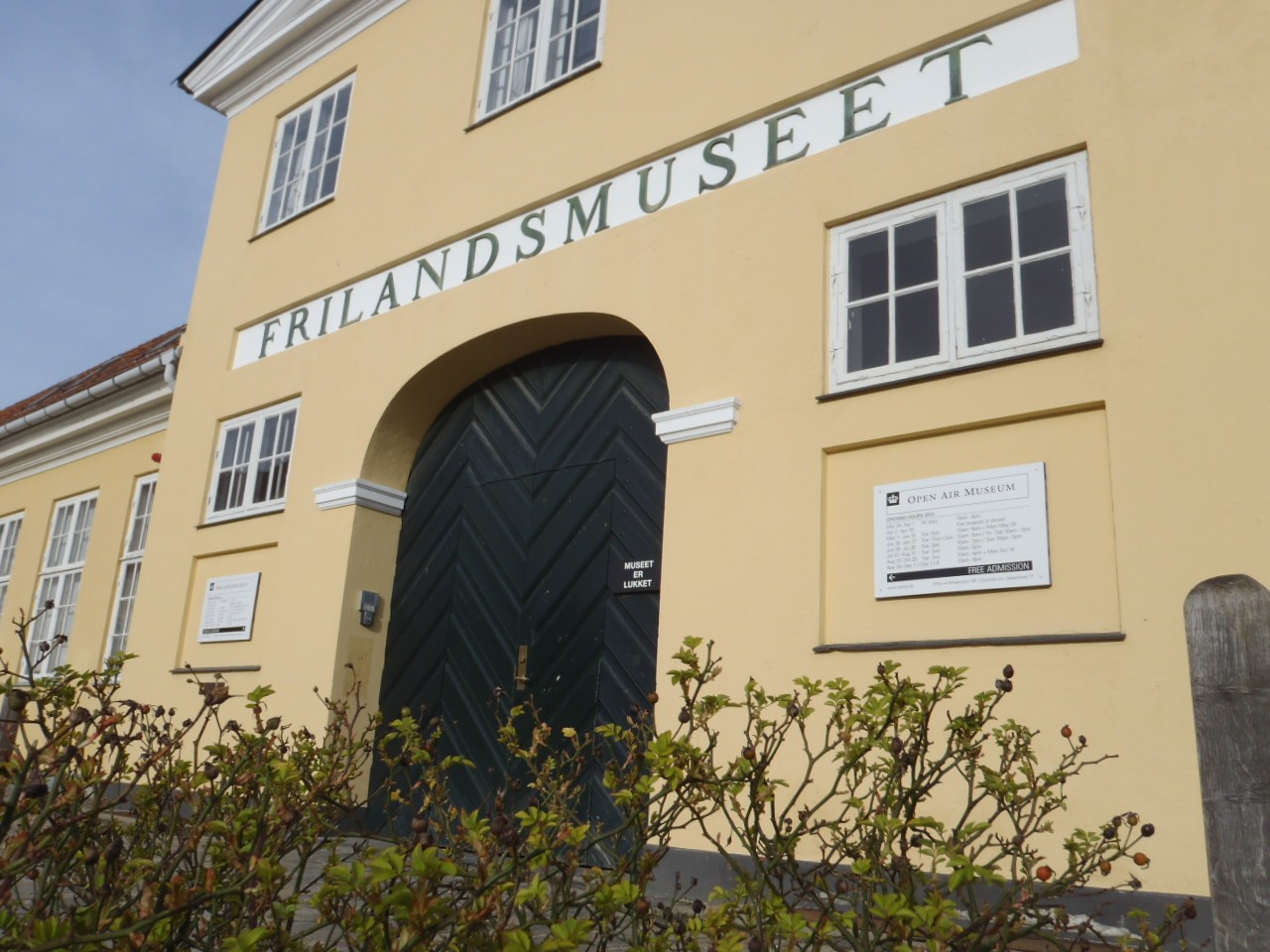
- Established: 1897
- Location: Lyngby, Denmark
- Type: Open-air museum
- Visitors: 264,805 (2007)
- Website: Frilandsmuseet

Frilandsmuseet (English: Open Air Museum) is an open-air museum on the northern outskirts of Copenhagen, Denmark. The museum is located in Lyngby on Kongevejen in North Zealand. The museum can be reached directly by bus number 184 from Nørreport Station in central Copenhagen or by S-train to Sorgenfri station.

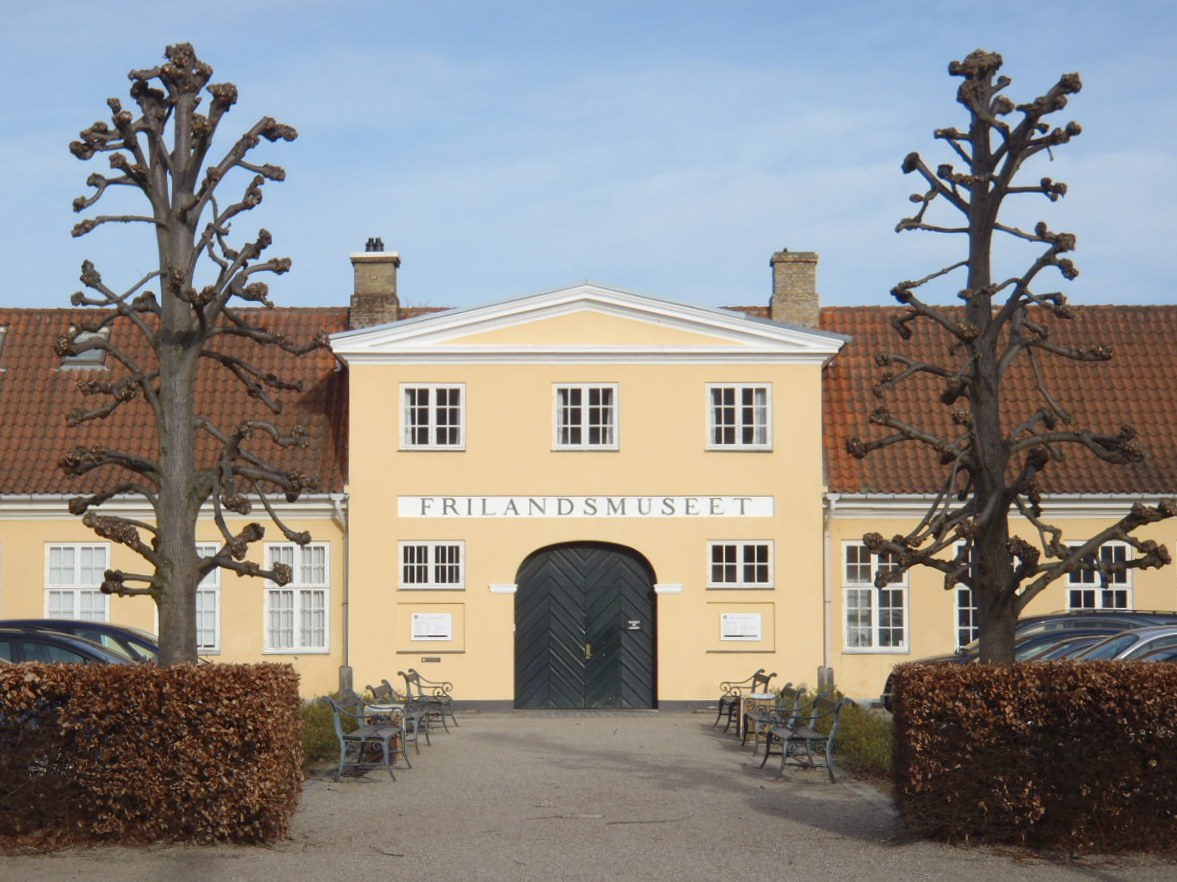
Frilandsmuseet

== Buildings ==
Opened in 1897, it moved to its present location in 1901. Covering 40 hectares, it is one of the largest and oldest open-air museums in the world. It is a department under the Danish National Museum and is part of the research done on agricultural history.

The museum features more than 100 buildings from rural environments and dating from 1650-1950. All buildings are original and have been moved piece by piece from their original location save a windmill that is still found in its original location. The museum contains rural buildings from all regions of Denmark, including many of the small and remote Danish islands including Bornholm and Læsø. Buildings include a farmhouse from the island of Læsø thatched with kelp.

Represented are also buildings from the Faroe Islands, as well as the former Danish possessions of Southern Schleswig in Germany and Scania and Halland in Sweden. The distribution demonstrates how life has been adapted to regional living conditions and availability of materials. Represented in the collection are also all social living conditions, from a manor house to a poorhouse, different types of buildings like farms, mills and workshops, and numerous professions. The museum includes six mills including a post mill from 1662. Some of the mills are regularly operated by a guild of volunteers.

The grounds of the museum also features 25 historic gardens and cultural landscapes and livestock of old Danish breeds. The gardens and animals are displayed in connection with the socially and geographically corresponding buildings.

== Gallery ==
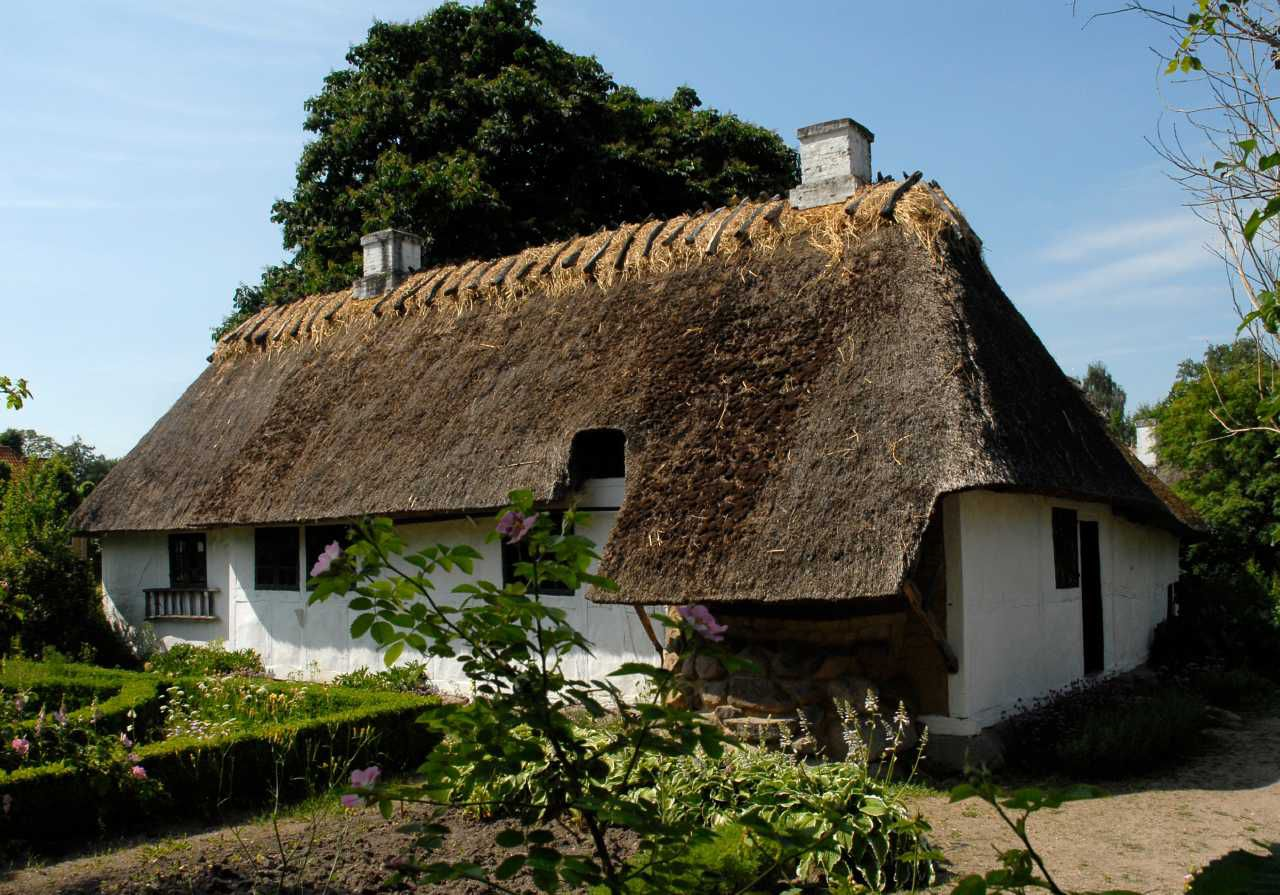
Træsko'Maker's House, Kirke Søby

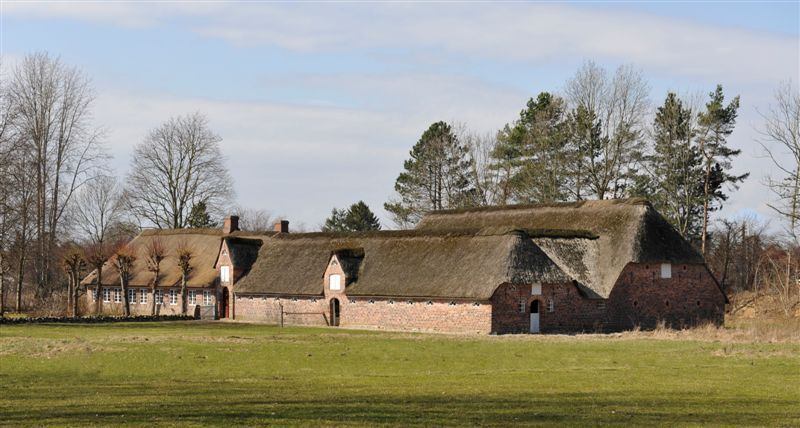
Farmhouse from Sønder Sejerslev

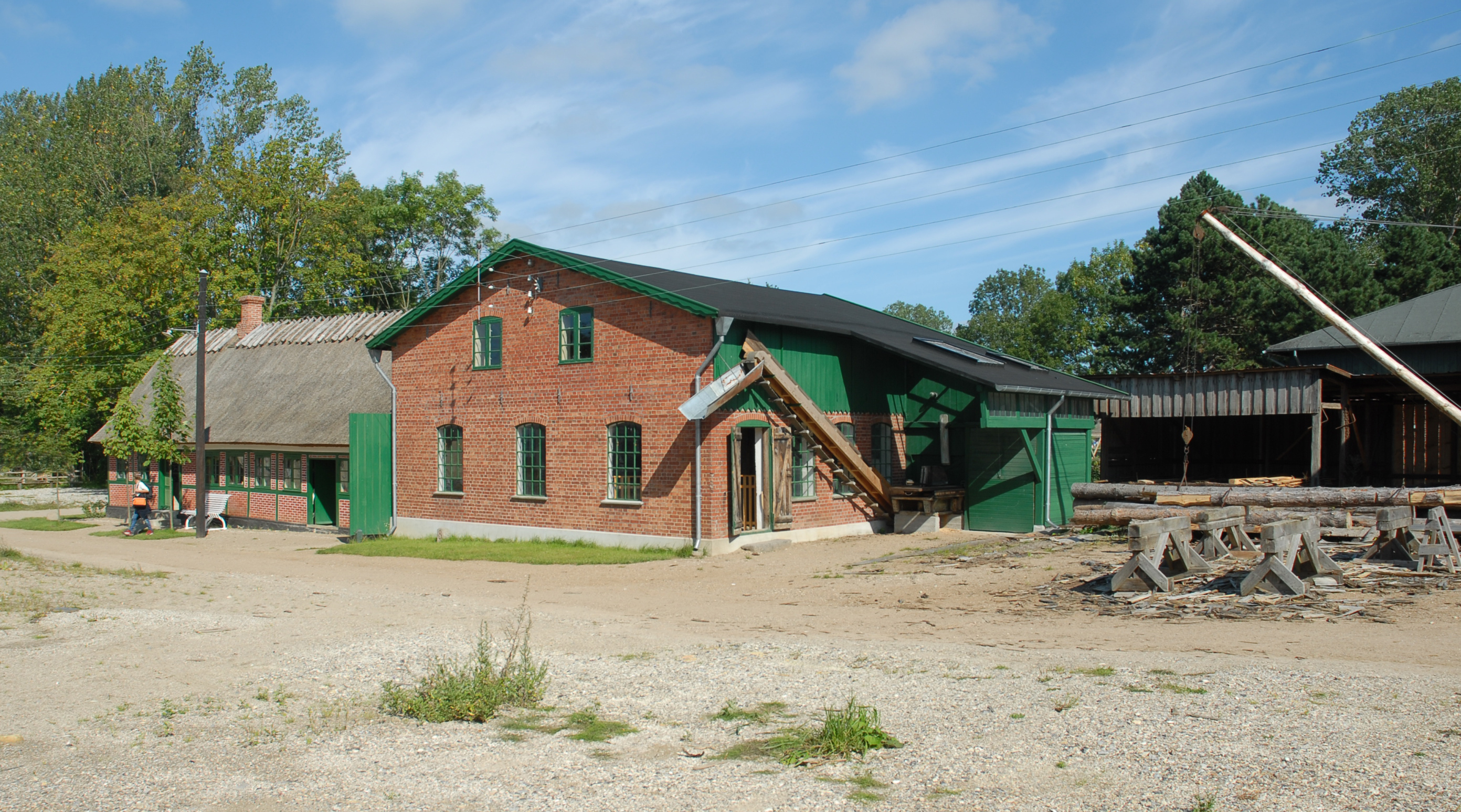
Woodworker's workshop from Borre on Møn

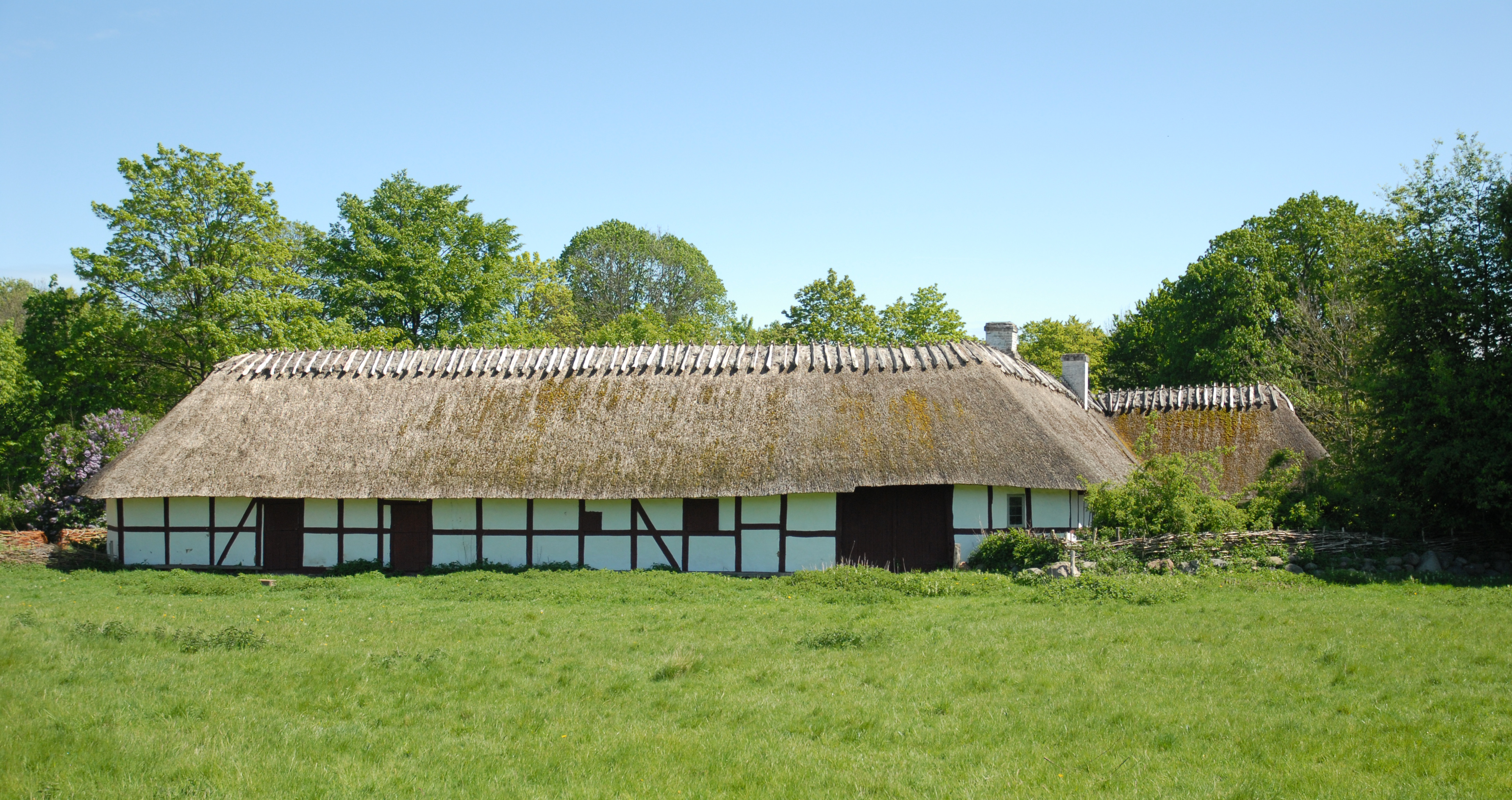
Farmhouse from Lundager on Funen

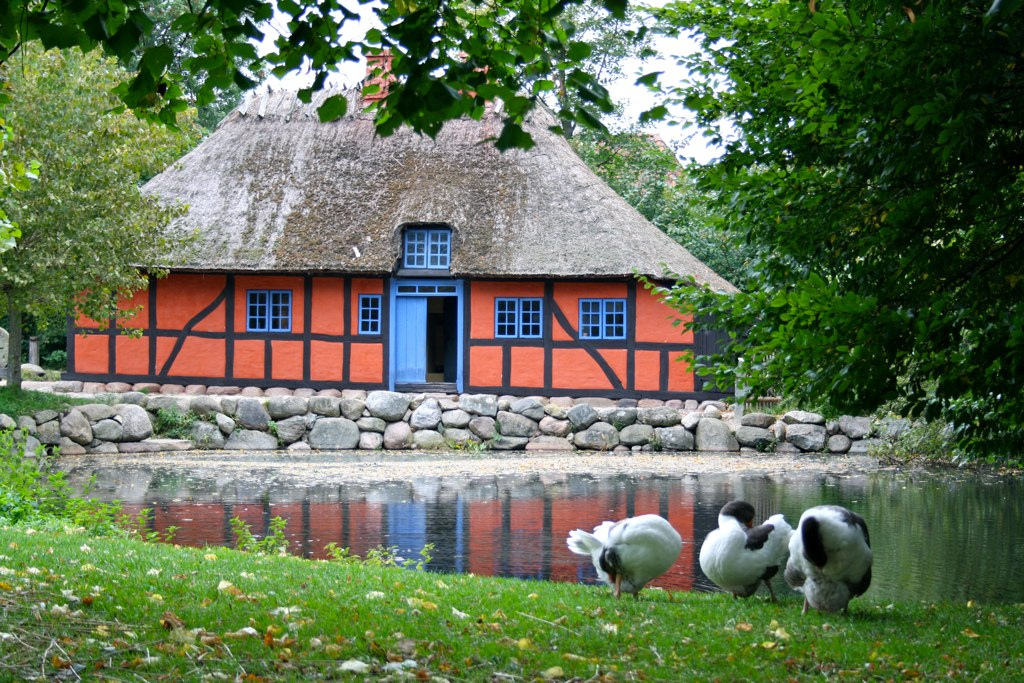
Forge from Ørbæk on Funen

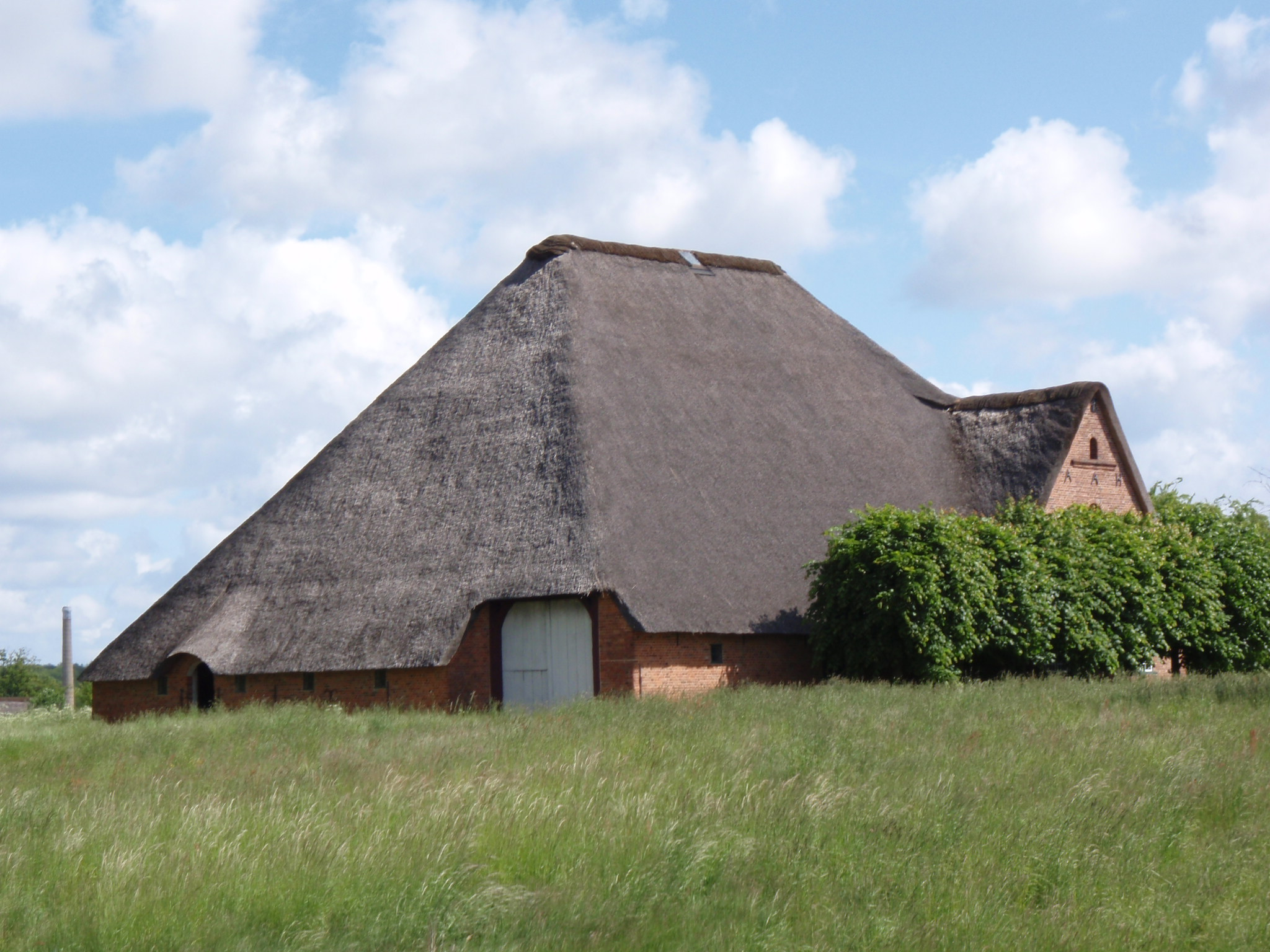
Marsh farm from Sønderjylland

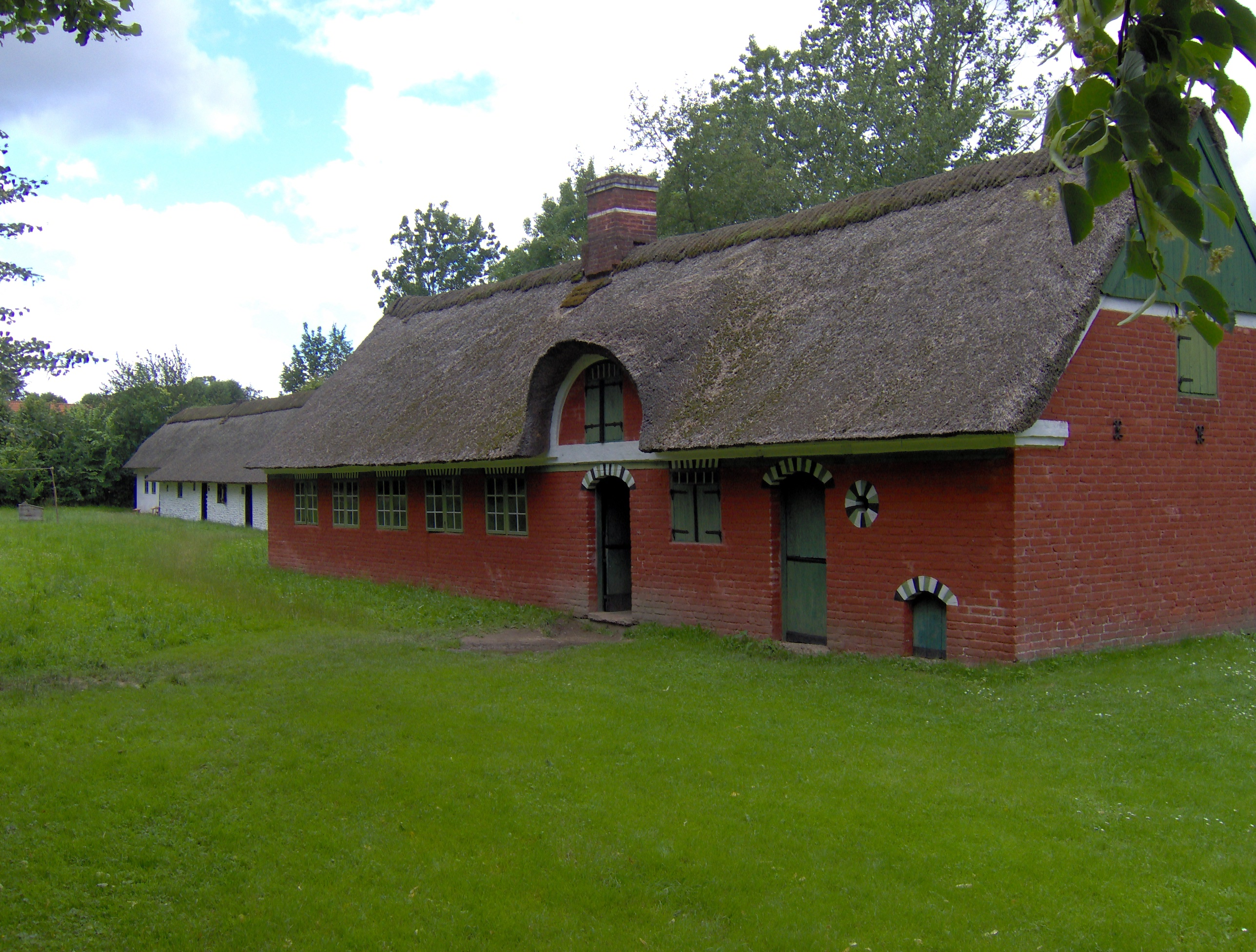
Skipper's house from Fanø

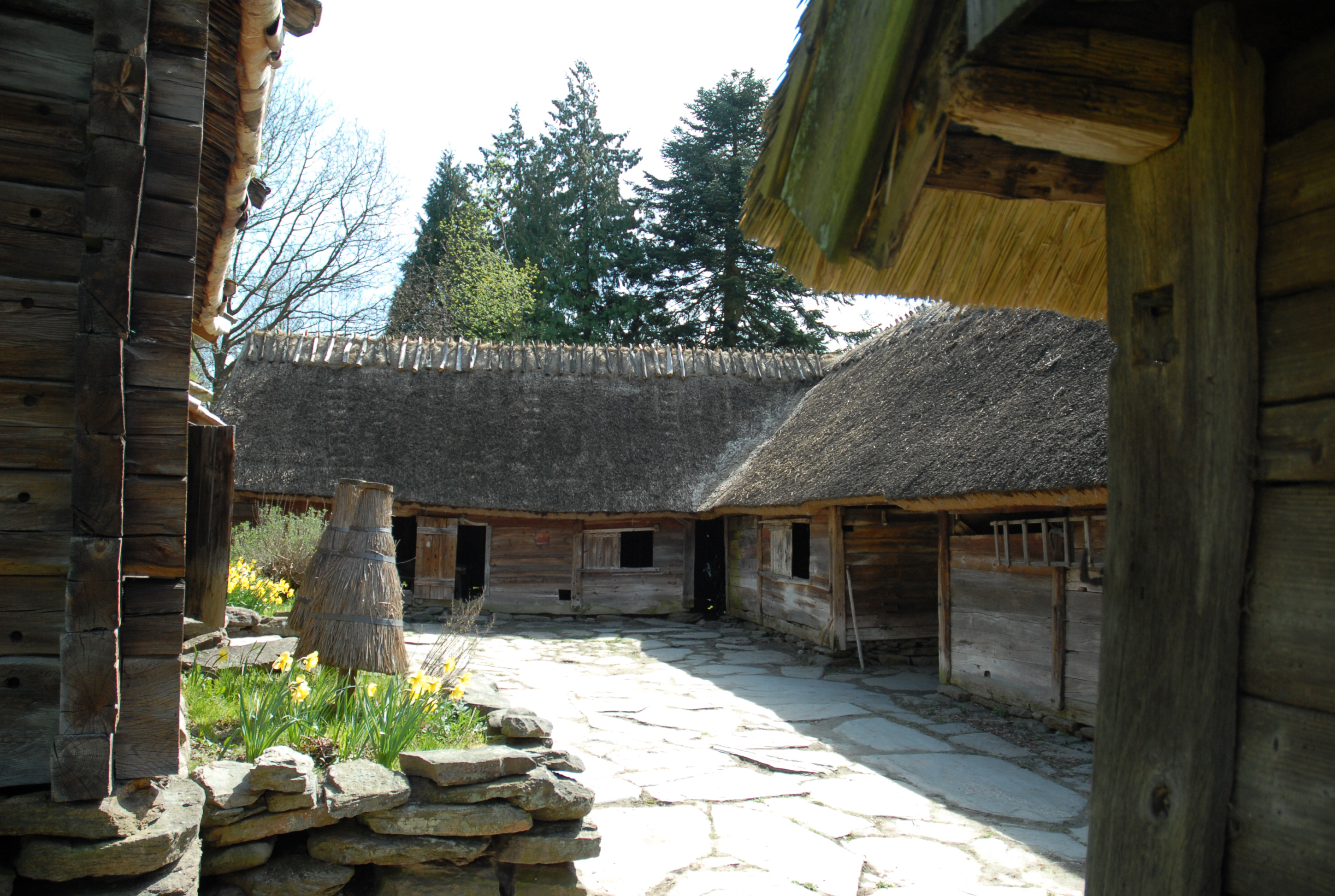
Farmhouse from Jalland

== See also ==
- Danish National Museum
- The Funen Village
- The Old Town, Aarhus
- Bondebyen
