= Melby, Halsnæs =

Melby
- Town
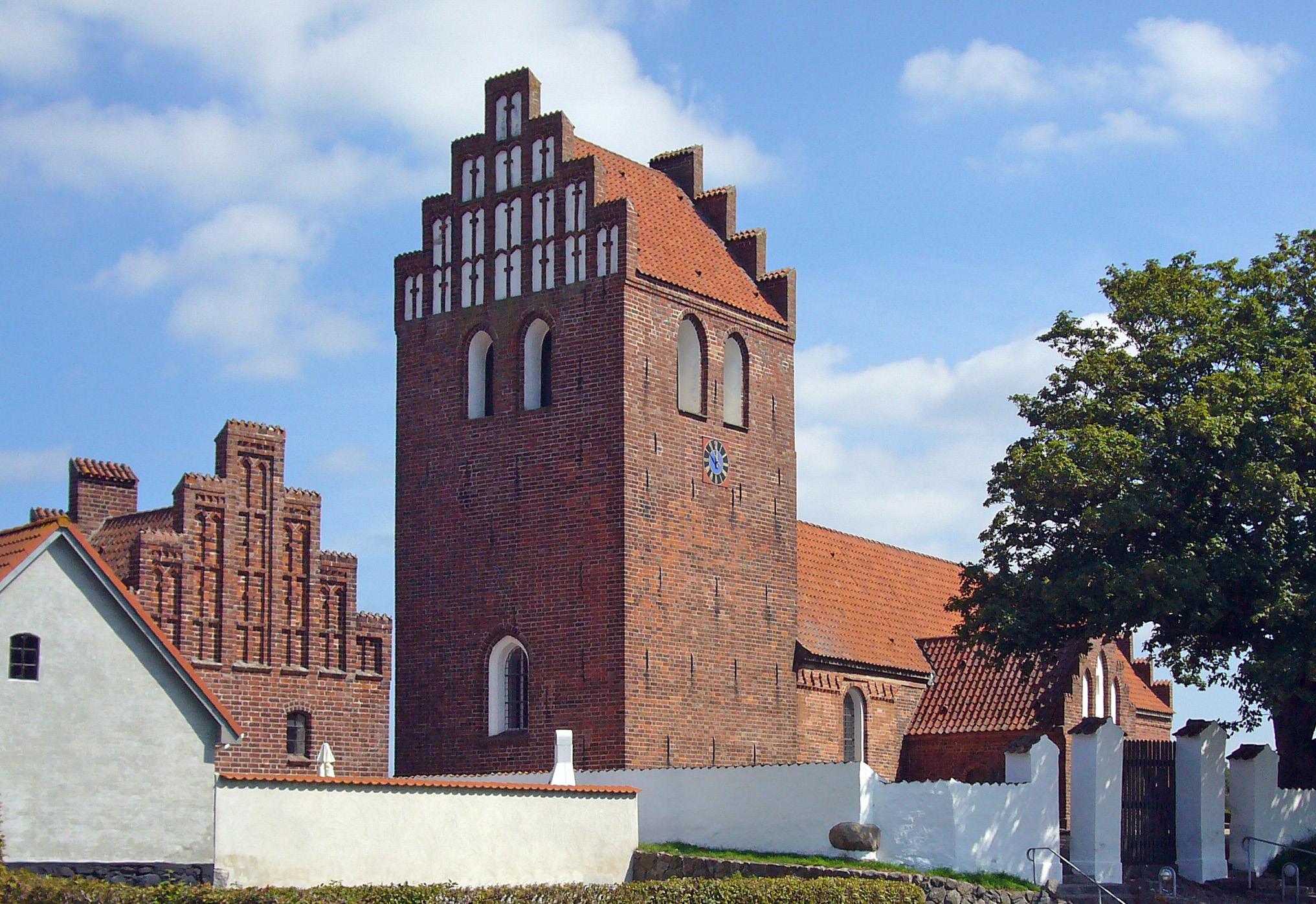
- The church

- Location within Denmark Location within Capital Region
- Coordinates: 55°59′43″N 11°58′11″E
- Country: Denmark
- Region: Capital Region
- Municipality: Halsnæs

Area
  - Urban: 0.71 km^{2} (0.27 sq mi)

Population (2026)
  - Urban: 783
  - Urban density: 1,100/km^{2} (2,900/sq mi)
- Time zone: UTC+1 (GMT)
- Postal code: 3370 Melby

Melby is a village located on the Halsnæs peninsula, midway between Frederiksværk and Hundested, Halsnæs Municipality, North Zealand, some 60 km north of Copenhagen, Denmark. It most notable landmarks are its church, its windmill and a former military camp. Melby Station is served by the Hundested Line between Hillerød and Hundested. As of 1 January 2026, the population was 783.

The name Melby is also associated with Melbylejren, a former military installation which is now located in Liseleje-Asserbo, as well as Melby Overdrev, an area of protected heatherlands separating Liseleje and Asserbo Plantations to the east of Liseleje.

== Church ==
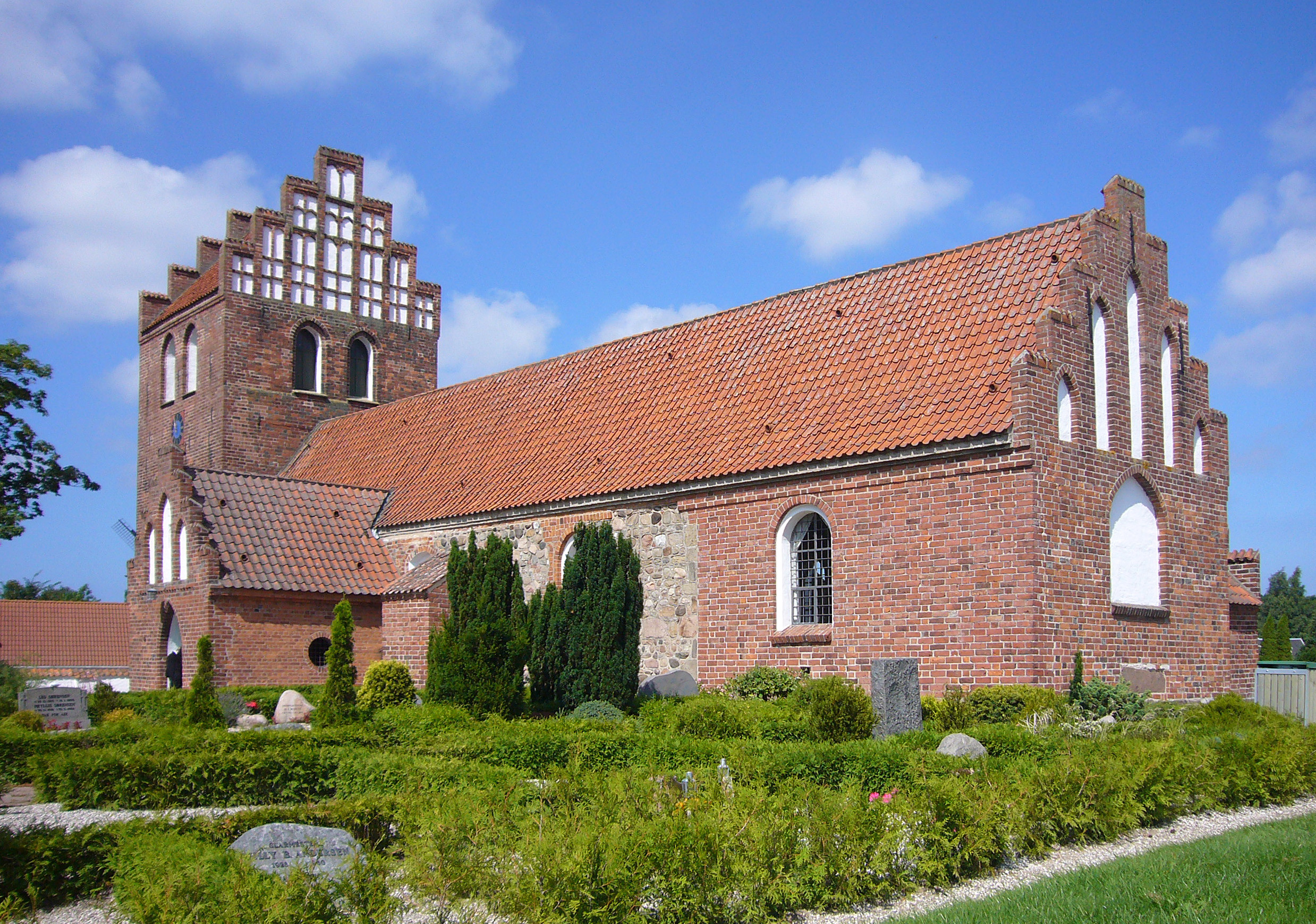
Melby Kirke2015

The original Romanesque stone church was built in about 1100. The tower and current chancel date from the 16th century. Both are built in red brick and are decorated with white lesenes. The cross-vaulted interior is richly decorated with frescoes from the 1600th century. The pulpit was carved by Johannes Andreæ. The writer Leif Panduro is buried in the cemetery.

The site also includes a church barn from the first half of the 16th century which was listed in 1967. Only about one-quarter of the original barn survives since the rest disappeared when the building was renovated in 1722 after having fallen into despair. The east wall with the two doors and the south gable date from 1888 when the building was adapted for use as a burial chapel.

== Windmill ==
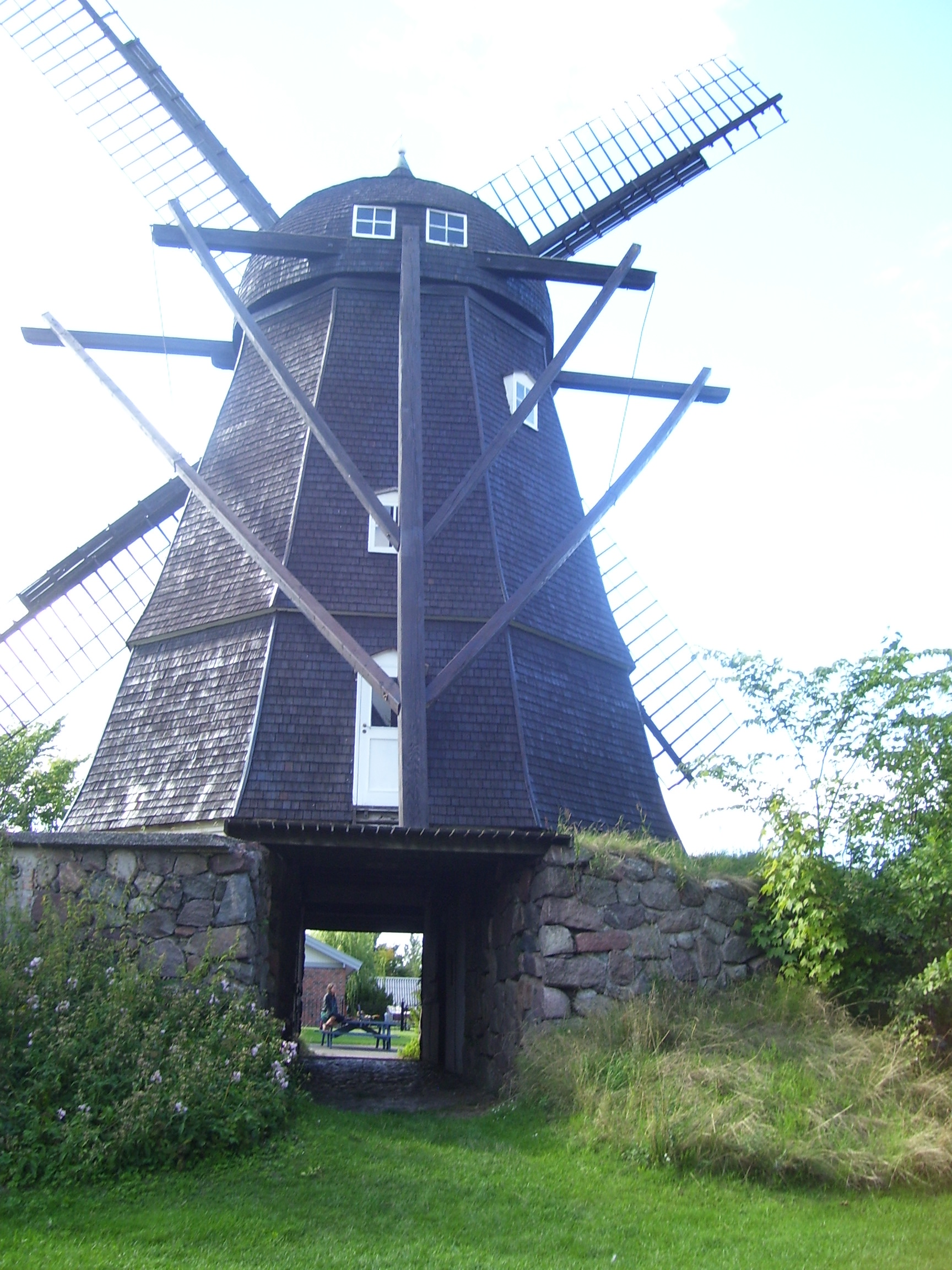
Melby Windmill

Melby Windmill (Danish: Melby Mølle) stands on a small hill. It was built in 1879 and remained in service until 1946. It is a smock mill consisting of an octagonal tower and an ogee cap. It was built as a grain mill but later used as a saw mill but no longer functions. It is open to visitors.

== Syvhøje ==
Syvhøje, literally "Seven Mounds", the name of a group of originally eight burial mounds from approximately 1500 BC located just east of the village. Only four of them are visible today. They are reached by taking the road towards Asserbo and turning right along Præstegårdsvej. The area is grazed by cattle and sheap and offers good views of the surrounding countryside.

== Transport ==
Melby Station is served by the Hundested Line between Hillerød and Hundested. The travel time is 32–34 minutes to Hillerød, 11 minutes to Hundested and 6 minutes to Frederiksværk.

== Notable people ==
- Kurt Madsen (born 1936 in Melby) a Danish wrestler, competed at the 1964 and 1968 Summer Olympics

== See also ==
- Ølsted, Halsnæs Municipality
