= Karlstrup =

Village in Solrød Municipality, Denmark

Coordinates: 55°33′N 12°13′E

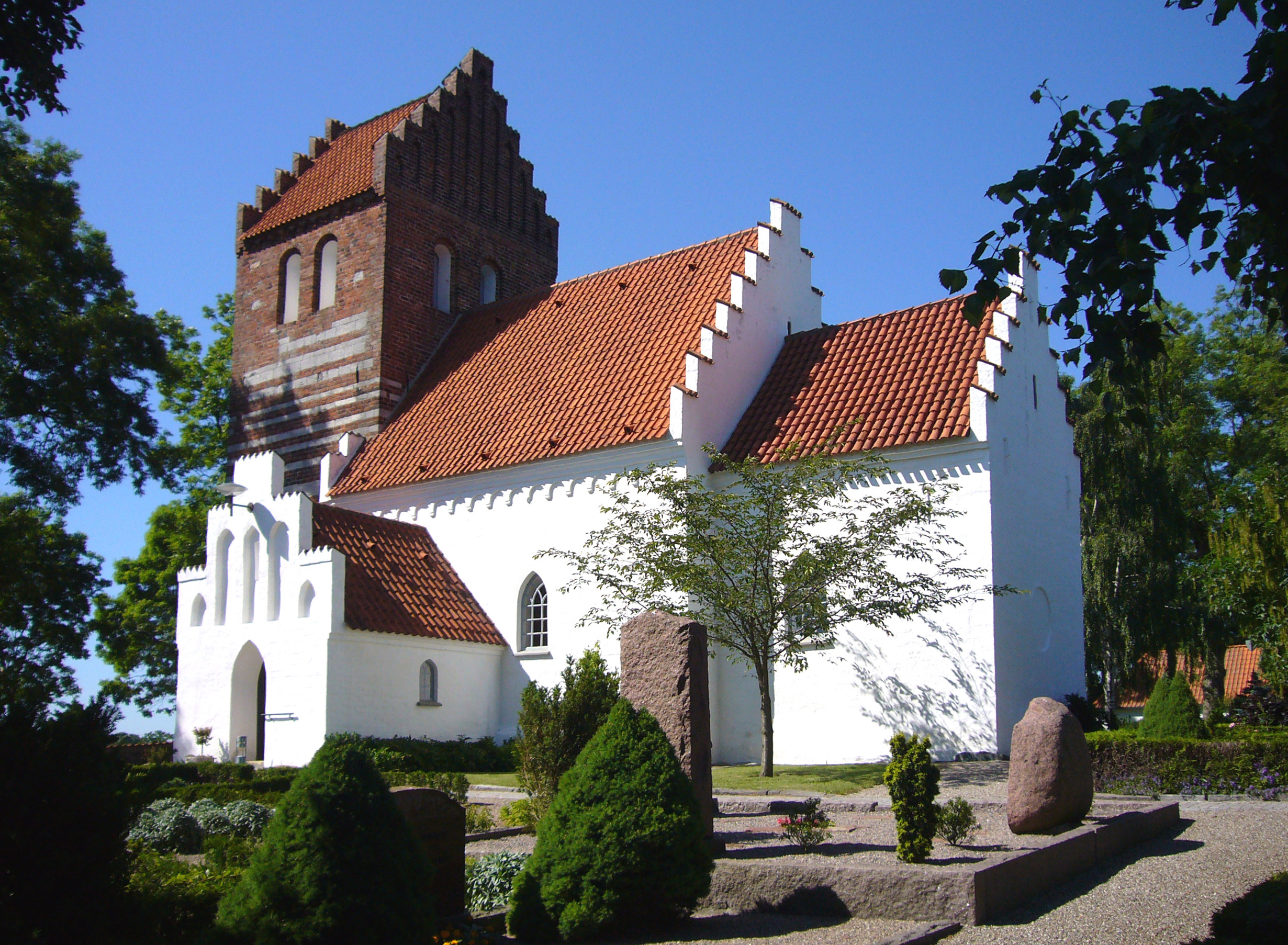
Karlstrup Church

Karlstrup Landsby is a small village in the municipality of Solrød, Denmark. The village is approximately 30 km from the nation's capital, Copenhagen, and approximately 3 km from the beach, Karlstrup Strand, which is situated in the middle of Køge Bay. There is a lake nearby, Karlstrup Kalkgrav, which used to be a chalk pit. The Danish national cycle route #9 passes through the village.
