= Institute for the Blind and Partially Sighted (Denmark) =

Organization for people with sight loss in Denmark

RNIB
- Established: 1858
- Chief Executive: Anne Kristine Grosbøll
- Location: Copenhagen, Denmark
- Website: ibos.dk

The Institute for the Blind and Partially Sighted (Danish Instituttet for Blinde og Svagsynede, IBOS), headquartered on Rymarksvej in Hellerup, Copenhagen, is a national institution offering information, support and advice to people with sight loss in Denmark. It is government-funded and has nationwide responsibilities but is operated by Copenhagen Municipality.

== History ==
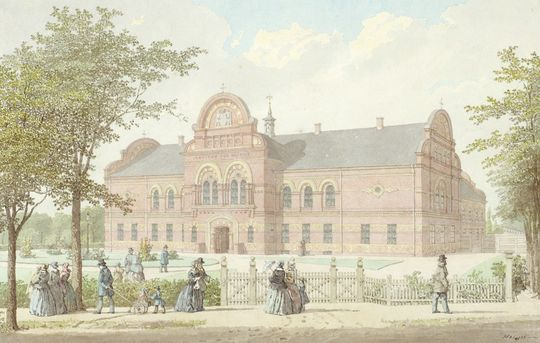
The Royal Institute for the Blind in 1850, watercolour by H.G.F. Holm

The first Institute for the Blind was established by the philanthropical Kjæden ("The Chain") society on 10 June 1811. The children were taught theoretical subjects such as religion, math, history and geography as well as needlework, spinning, knitting, paper crafting and basket making.

The building on Kastelsvej in Østerbro was built by the Kjeldsen Society in 1857–58 The institution was at the same event ceded to the Danish state and renamed the Royal Institute for the Blind. The building was one of the first civilian brick buildings to be constructed outside Copenhagen's old East Rampart when the city's fortifications were decommissioned in the 1850s. It was built next to the Institute for the Deaf which had already been completed on the glacis in front of Kastellet in 1838. The Institute for the Deaf had been built as am arrowhead-shaped revelin which could easily be converted into a defensive structure in the event of an enemy attack. Ferdinand Meldahl was charged with the design of the building. Construction began in 1957 and it was completed in 1858. The three-winged complex had room for 60 students, 30 boys and 30 girls, housed in each their lateral wing. The main wing contained various workshops and activity rooms. The institution opened in 1858 with 25 students and with J. Moldenhawer as its first principal.

The building was expanded with a new rear wing in 1880. Rooms for 40 new students were created in the main wing while most of the workshops and activity rooms were moved to the new wing.

A new institution was built in the 1960s in Hellerup's Ryvangen neighbourhood. The foundation stone was set on 25 May 1966.

== Headquarters ==
The premises are located on Rymarksvej in Hellerup. The buildings also houses a branch of the Kennedy Vision Health Center.

== Organisation ==
IBOS has approximately 130 employees. The current chief executive is Anne Kristine Grosbøll. The centre has the following departments:

- Administration & Services
- Special counselling
- Job & Courses
- Housing, Workshop & Activities
