= List of parishes in the Capital Region of Denmark =

This is a list of parishes in the Capital Region of Denmark. As of 2022, there are 2,133 parishes (Danish: Sogn) within the Church of Denmark, approximately 150 of which are within the Capital Region of Denmark. They are listed below by municipality.

== Albertslund ==
Map of the parishes in Albertslund Municipality.

1. Herstedvester Parish
2. Herstedøster Parish
3. Opstandelseskirkens Parish

== Allerød ==
- Blovstrød Parish
- Engholm Parish
- Lillerød Parish
- Lynge Parish
- Uggeløse Parish

== Ballerup ==
Map of the parishes in Ballerup Municipality.

1. Maløv Parish
2. Ballerup Parish
3. Pederstrup Parish
4. Skovlunde Parish

== Bornholm ==
Map of the parishes in Bornholm Municipality.

1. Christiansø Parish
2. Allinge-Sandvig Parish
3. Rutsker Parish
4. Olsker Parish
5. Rø Parish
6. Gudhjem Parish
7. Hasle Parish
8. Klemensker Parish
9. Østerlarsker Parish
10. Nyker Parish
11. Knudsker Parish
12. Vestermarie Parish
13. Østermarie Parish
14. Ibsker Parish
15. Svaneke Parish
16. Rønne Parish
17. Nylarsker Parish
18. Aaker Parish
19. Bodilsker Parish
20. Nexø Parish
21. Pedersker Parish
22. Poulsker Parish

== Brøndby ==
Map of the parishes in Brøndby Municipality.

1. Brøndbyvester Parish
2. Nygårds Parish
3. Brøndbyøster Parish
4. Brøndby Strand Parish

== Copenhagen ==
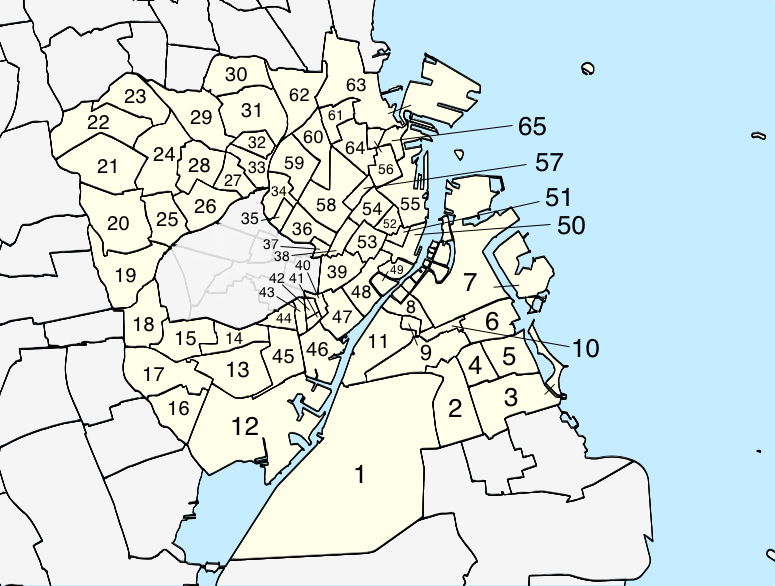
Map of the parishes in Copenhagen Municipality.

1. Solvang Parish
2. Højdevang Parish
3. Simon Peters Parish
4. Filips Parish
5. Sundkirkens Parish
6. Allehelgens Parish
7. Vor Frelsers Parish
8. Christians Parish
9. Sundby Parish
10. Nathanaels Parish
11. Islands Brygge Parish
12. Sydhavn Parish
13. Johannes Døbers Parish
14. Valby Parish
15. Timotheus Parish
16. Margrethe Parish
17. Vigerslev Parish
18. Ålholm Parish
19. Hyltebjerg Parish
20. Vanløse Parish
21. Husum Parish
22. Husumvold Parish
23. Tingbjerg Parish
24. Brønshøj Parish
25. Advents Parish
26. Grøndals Parish
27. Ansgarkirkens Parish
28. Bellahøj Parish
29. Utterslev Parish
30. Emdrup Parish
31. Bispebjerg Parish
32. Tagensbo Parish
33. Kapernaums Parish
34. Sankt Stefans Parish
35. Anna Parish
36. Blågårdens Parish
37. Bethlehems Parish
38. Sankt Andreas Parish
39. Vor Frue Parish
40. Elias Parish
41. Gethsemane Parish
42. Apostelkirkens Parish
43. Sankt Matthæus Parish
44. Kristkirkens Parish
45. Enghave Parish
46. Absalons Parish
47. Maria Parish
48. Helligånds Parish
49. Holmens Parish
50. Garnisons Parish
51. Frederiks Parish
52. Sankt Pauls Parish
53. Trinitatis Parish
54. Østervold Parish
55. Kastels Parish
56. Rosenvængets Parish
57. Fredens-Nazaret Parish
58. Simeon-Sankt Johannes Parish
59. Kingo-Samuel Parish
60. Aldersro Parish
61. Kildevælds Parish
62. Lundehus Parish
63. Sions Parish
64. Sankt Jakobs Parish
65. Hans Egedes Parish

== Dragør ==
Map of the parishes in Dragør Municipality.

1. Store Magleby
2. Dragør

== Egedal ==
- Ganløse Parish
- Jørlunde Parish
- Ledøje Parish
- Slagslunde Parish
- Smørum Parish
- Stenløse Parish
- Veksø Parish
- Ølstykke Parish

== Fredensborg ==
- Asminderød-Grønholt Parish
- Humlebæk Parish
- Karlebo Parish

== Frederiksberg ==
Map of the parishes in Frederiksberg Municipality, within the city of Copenhagen.

1. Mariendals Parish
2. Godthaabs Parish
3. Sankt Lukas Parish
4. Sankt Thomas Parish
5. Flintholm Parish
6. Lindevang Parish
7. Solbjerg Parish
8. Sankt Markus Parish
9. Frederiksberg Parish

== Frederikssund ==
- Draaby Parish
- Ferslev Parish
- Frederikssund Parish
- Gerlev Parish
- Græse Parish
- Islebjerg Parish
- Jørlunde Parish
- Krogstrup Parish
- Kyndby Parish
- Oppe Sundby Parish
- Selsø Parish
- Sigerslevvester Parish
- Skibby Parish
- Skoven Parish
- Skuldelev Parish
- Slangerup Parish
- Snostrup Parish
- Vellerup Parish

== Furesø ==
- Farum Parish
- Hareskov Parish
- Værløse Parish

== Gentofte ==
- Dyssegård Parish
- Gentofte Parish
- Hellerup Parish
- Helleruplund Parish
- Jægersborg Parish
- Maglegårds Parish
- Ordrup Parish
- Skovshoved Parish
- Vangede Parish

== Gladsaxe ==
- Bagsværd Parish
- Buddinge Parish
- Gladsaxe Parish
- Haralds Parish
- Mørkhøj Parish
- Stengård Parish
- Søborggård Parish
- Søborgmagle Parish

== Glostrup ==
- Glostrup Parish

== Gribskov ==
- Annisse Parish
- Blistrup Parish
- Esbønderup Parish
- Gilleleje Parish
- Græsted Parish
- Helsinge Parish
- Mårum Parish
- Ramløse Parish
- Søborg Parish
- Tibirke Parish
- Valby Parish
- Vejby Parish
- Villingerød Parish

== Halsnæs ==
- Frederiksværk-Vinderød Parish
- Kregme Parish
- Melby Parish
- Torup Parish
- Ølsted Parish

=== Former parishes ===
- Frederiksværk Parish
- Vinderød Parish

== Helsingør ==
- Egebæksvang Parish
- Gurre Parish
- Hellebæk Parish
- Hornbæk Parish
- Mørdrup Parish
- Sankt Mariæ Parish
- Sankt Olai Parish
- Sthens Parish
- Tikøb Parish
- Vestervang Parish

== Herlev ==
- Herlev Parish
- Lindehøj Parish
- Præstebro Parish

== Hillerød ==
- Alsønderup Parish
- Frederiksborg Slotssogn
- Gadevang Parish
- Grønnevang Parish
- Gørløse Parish
- Hillerød Parish
- Lille Lyngby Parish
- Nødebo Parish
- Nørre Herlev Parish
- Præstevang Parish
- Skævinge Parish
- Strø Parish
- Tjæreby Parish
- Ullerød Parish
- Uvelse Parish

== Hørsholm ==
- Blovstrød Parish
- Hørsholm Parish
- Kokkedal Parish
- Rungsted Parish

== Høje-Taastrup ==
- Fløng Parish
- Hedehusene Parish
- Høje Taastrup Parish
- Reerslev Parish
- Rønnevang Parish
- Sengeløse Parish
- Taastrup Nykirke Parish

== Hvidovre ==
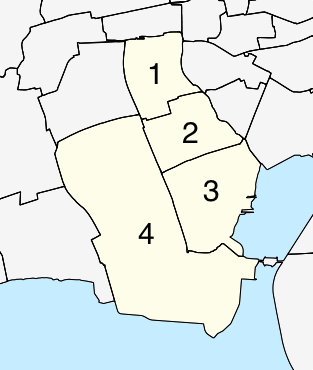
Map of the parishes in Hvidovre Municipality.

1. Hvidovre Parish
2. Risbjerg Parish
3. Strandmark Parish
4. Avedøre Parish

== Ishøj ==
- Ishøj Parish
- Torslunde Parish

== Lyngby-Taarbæk ==
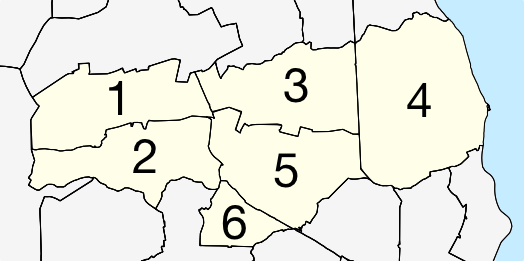
Map of the parishes in Lyngby-Taarbæk Municipality.

1. Virum Parish
2. Sorgenfri Parish
3. Lundtofte Parish
4. Tårbæk Parish
5. Kongens Lyngby Parish
6. Christians Parish

== Rudersdal ==
- Birkerød Parish
- Bistrup Parish
- Gammel Holte Parish
- Høsterkøb Parish
- Ny Holte Parish
- Nærum Parish
- Søllerød Parish
- Vedbæk Parish

== Rødovre ==
- Grøndalslund Parish
- Hendriksholm Parish
- Islev Parish
- Rødovre Parish

== Tårnby ==
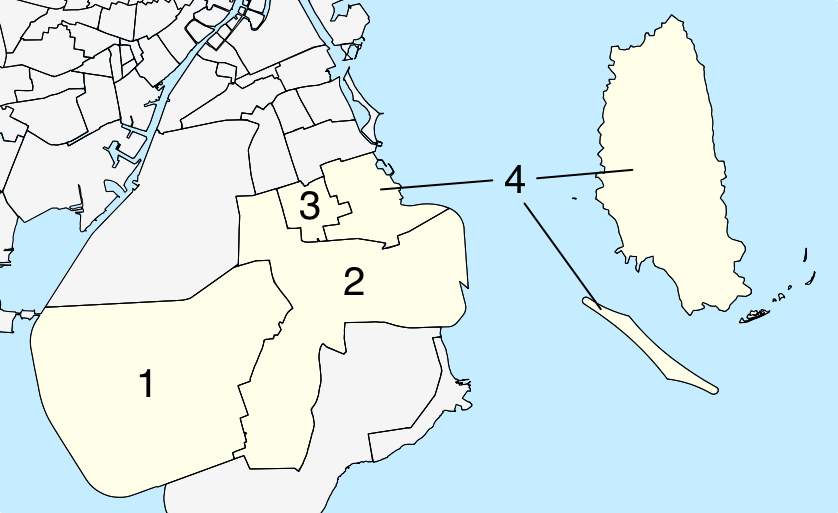
Map of the parishes in Tårnby Municipality.

1. Skelgård Parish
2. Tårnby Parish
3. Korsvejens Parish
4. Kastrup Parish

== Vallensbæk ==
- Vallensbæk Parish
