= 2025 Halsnæs municipal election =

Municipal election in Denmark

- 18 November 2025

All 21 seats to the Halsnæs municipal council 11 seats needed for a majority
- Turnout: 17,540 (67.0%) ▲1.1%
	First party	Second party	Third party
	A	V	F
Party	Social Democrats	Venstre	Green Left
Last election	11 seats, 46.6%	5 seats, 21.6%	2 seats, 9.2%
Seats won	9	3	2
Seat change	▼2	▼2	0
Popular vote	6,755	2,216	1,953
Percentage	39.1%	12.8%	11.3%
Swing	▼7.5%	▼8.8%	▲2.1%
	Fourth party	Fifth party	Sixth party
	O	Ø	C
Party	Danish People's Party	Red-Green Alliance	Conservatives
Last election	1 seat, 3.7%	1 seat, 5.3%	1 seat, 6.3%
Seats won	2	1	1
Seat change	▲1	0	0
Popular vote	1,165	1,176	1,075
Percentage	6.7%	6.8%	6.2%
Swing	▲3.1%	▲1.5%	▼0.0%
	Seventh party	Eighth party	Ninth party
	Æ	I	Å
Party	Denmark Democrats	Liberal Alliance	The Alternative
Last election	Did not stand	Did not stand	0 seats, 1.5%
Seats won	1	1	1
Seat change	▲1	▲1	▲1
Popular vote	900	704	702
Percentage	5.2%	4.1%	4.1%
Swing	New	New	▲2.5%
Mayor before election
Steffen Jensen
Social Democrats
Mayor after election
Steffen Jensen
Social Democrats

The 2025 Halsnæs Municipal election was held on November 18, 2025, to elect the 21 members to sit in the regional council for the Halsnæs Municipal council, in the period of 2026 to 2029. Steffen Jensen from the Social Democrats, would secure re-election.

== Background ==
Following the 2021 election, Steffen Jensen from Social Democrats became mayor for his second term. It was however confirmed on October 3rd, 2023, that he would go on sick leave. Jensen would return as mayor 24 days later, and would run for a third term.

== Electoral system ==
For elections to Danish municipalities, a number varying from 9 to 31 are chosen to be elected to the municipal council. The seats are then allocated using the D'Hondt method and a closed list proportional representation. Halsnæs Municipality had 21 seats in 2025.

== Electoral alliances ==
=== Electoral Alliance 1 ===
Party		Political alignment
A	Social Democrats	Centre-left
F	Green Left	Centre-left to Left-wing
Ø	Red-Green Alliance	Left-wing to Far-Left

=== Electoral Alliance 2 ===
Party		Political alignment
B	Social Liberals	Centre to Centre-left
Å	The Alternative	Centre-left to Left-wing

=== Electoral Alliance 3 ===
Party		Political alignment
C	Conservatives	Centre-right
I	Liberal Alliance	Centre-right to Right-wing
O	Danish People's Party	Right-wing to Far-right
Æ	Denmark Democrats	Right-wing to Far-right

=== Electoral Alliance 4 ===
Party		Political alignment
M	Moderates	Centre to Centre-right
V	Venstre	Centre-right

== Results by polling station ==
Division	A	B	C	F	I	M	O	R	V	Æ	Ø	Å
Division	%	%	%	%	%	%	%	%	%	%	%	%
Hundested	32.9	1.8	5.0	16.4	3.0	1.6	5.5	0.7	12.5	4.5	9.7	6.3
Melby	43.9	1.8	6.2	9.5	5.1	1.3	6.8	0.3	13.0	4.3	5.6	2.3
Enghaven	44.8	1.0	9.5	6.8	4.2	1.5	7.2	0.0	13.5	4.6	4.2	2.7
Frederiksværk	41.8	1.6	5.9	9.6	4.3	1.5	7.0	0.6	13.1	5.1	5.8	3.7
Ølsted	38.1	2.2	7.2	7.0	5.4	2.2	9.6	0.3	12.1	9.6	4.8	1.5

== Results ==
Party		Votes	%	+/-	Seats	+/-
Halsnæs Municipality
A	Social Democrats	6,755	39.06	-7.52	9	-2
V	Venstre	2,216	12.81	-8.82	3	-2
F	Green Left	1,953	11.29	+2.10	2	0
Ø	Red-Green Alliance	1,176	6.80	+1.52	1	0
O	Danish People's Party	1,165	6.74	+3.07	2	+1
C	Conservatives	1,075	6.22	-0.05	1	0
Æ	Denmark Democrats	900	5.20	New	1	New
I	Liberal Alliance	704	4.07	New	1	New
Å	The Alternative	702	4.06	+2.53	1	+1
B	Social Liberals	293	1.69	-0.06	0	0
M	Moderates	269	1.56	New	0	New
R	Rationelle	88	0.51	New	0	New
Total		17,296	100	N/A	21	N/A
Invalid votes		49	0.19	-0.02		
Blank votes		195	0.74	+0.09		
Turnout		17,540	66.96	+1.07		
Source: valg.dk

== Opinion polls ==
Polling firm	Fieldwork date	Sample size	A	V	F	C	Ø	O	B	Å	I	M	R	Æ	Others	Lead
Epinion	4 Sep - 13 Oct 2025	599	43.7	11.7	9.2	4.1	7.0	10.8	1.3	2.6	5.6	1.8	–	2.1	0.1	32.0
2024 european parliament election	9 Jun 2024		18.3	11.5	19.6	6.6	7.3	9.8	4.6	3.0	5.5	7.1	–	6.7	–	1.3
2022 general election	1 Nov 2022		33.7	11.1	8.4	4.0	5.1	3.8	1.8	3.7	5.2	9.3	–	8.0	–	22.6
2021 regional election	16 Nov 2021		33.5	20.5	11.9	10.0	6.2	4.6	3.3	1.6	0.7	–	–	–	–	13.0
2021 municipal election	16 Nov 2021		46.6 (11)	21.6 (5)	9.2 (2)	6.3 (1)	5.3 (1)	3.7 (1)	1.7 (0)	1.5 (0)	–	–	–	–	–	25.0
