= 2021 Halsnæs municipal election =

← 2017	16 November 2021	2025 →

All 21 seats to the Halsnæs Municipal Council 11 seats needed for a majority
- Turnout: 16,977 (65.9%) ▼5.2pp
	First party	Second party	Third party
	A	V	F
Party	Social Democrats	Venstre	Green Left
Last election	10 seats, 38.8%	6 seats, 24.8%	2 seats, 7.8%
Seats won	11	5	2
Seat change	▲1	▼1	0
Popular vote	7,801	3,623	1,540
Percentage	46.6%	21.6%	9.2%
Swing	▲7.8%	▼3.2%	▲1.4%
	Fourth party	Fifth party	Sixth party
	C	Ø	O
Party	Conservatives	Red–Green Alliance	Danish People's Party
Last election	0 seats, 2.3%	1 seat, 5.2%	2 seats, 11.2%
Seats won	1	1	1
Seat change	▲1	0	▼1
Popular vote	1,049	885	614
Percentage	6.3%	5.3%	3.7%
Swing	▲4%	▲0.1%	▼7.5%
Mayor before election
Steffen Jensen
Social Democrats
Mayor after election
Steffen Jensen
Social Democrats

Following the 2017 Halsnæs municipal election, Steffen Jensen from the Social Democrats had won the mayor's position from Venstre.

In this election, the Social Democrats would win their first absolute majority since the 2007 municipal reform, and for this reason, it was clear that Steffen Jensen would win a second term.

Despite having the absolute majority, the Social Democrats managed to make a constitution that all the 21 seats in municipal council could agree on.

== Electoral system ==
For elections to Danish municipalities, a number varying from 9 to 31 are chosen to be elected to the municipal council. The seats are then allocated using the D'Hondt method and a closed list proportional representation. Halsnæs Municipality had 21 seats in 2021

Unlike in Danish General Elections, in elections to municipal councils, electoral alliances are allowed.

== Electoral alliances ==
=== Electoral Alliance 1 ===
Party		Political alignment
B	Social Liberals	Centre to Centre-left
C	Conservatives	Centre-right
O	Danish People's Party	Right-wing to Far-right

=== Electoral Alliance 2 ===
Party		Political alignment
A	Social Democrats	Centre-left
F	Green Left	Centre-left to Left-wing
M	Det Miljøradikale Parti	Local politics
Ø	Red–Green Alliance	Left-wing to Far-Left
Å	The Alternative	Centre-left to Left-wing

== Results by polling station ==
M = Det Miljøradikale Parti

Division	A	B	C	D	F	M	O	V	Ø	Å
Division	%	%	%	%	%	%	%	%	%	%
Hundested	42.0	1.7	5.5	3.3	12.3	0.8	3.4	21.2	7.6	2.3
Melby	48.8	1.9	7.3	3.1	8.3	0.4	4.2	20.1	4.6	1.2
Enghaven	51.1	1.8	5.7	3.1	7.1	0.2	2.9	23.9	3.3	0.9
Frederiksværk	49.3	1.5	6.4	3.9	8.4	0.3	3.5	20.6	4.7	1.3
Ølsted	44.7	2.4	7.6	5.1	5.3	0.5	5.2	25.3	3.1	0.9

== Results ==
Party		Votes	%	+/-	Seats	+/-
Halsnæs Municipality
A	Social Democrats	7,801	46.57	+7.79	11	+1
V	Venstre	3,623	21.63	-3.22	5	-1
F	Green Left	1,540	9.19	+1.38	2	0
C	Conservatives	1,049	6.26	+3.99	1	+1
Ø	Red-Green Alliance	885	5.28	+0.04	1	0
O	Danish People's Party	614	3.67	-7.55	1	-1
D	New Right	609	3.64	+2.03	0	0
B	Social Liberals	293	1.75	-0.50	0	0
Å	The Alternative	256	1.53	-1.29	0	0
M	Det Miljøradikale Parti	80	0.48	New	0	New
Total		16,750	100	N/A	21	N/A
Invalid votes		53	0.21	+0.02		
Blank votes		174	0.68	+0.08		
Turnout		16,977	65.89	-5.21		
Source: valg.dk
