= List of churches in Halsnæs Municipality =

This list of churches in Halsnæs Municipality lists church buildings in Halsnæs Municipality, Denmark.

== List ==
| Name | Location | Year | Coordinates | Image | Refs |
|---|---|---|---|---|---|
| Frederiksværk Church | Frederiksværk | 1911 | 55°58′22.77″N 12°01′20.85″E | | |
| Kregme Church | Kregme | c. 12th century | 55°56′44.3″N 12°02′50.9″E | | |
| Lynæs Church | Hundested | 1901 | 55°57′04″N 11°51′34″E | | |
| Melby Church | Melby | 1080 | 55°59′44.3″N 11°58′8.6″E | | |
| Torup Church | Torup | 12th century | 55°59′00″N 11°56′24″E | | |
| Vinderød Church | Vinderød | 1883 | 55°59′6.5″N 12°02′07″E | | |
| Ølsted Church | Ølsted | 12th century | 55°55′16.6″N 12°04′23.1″E | | |

== See also ==
- Listed buildings in Gribskov Municipality
