= Torup, Halsnæs Municipality =

Torup
- Village
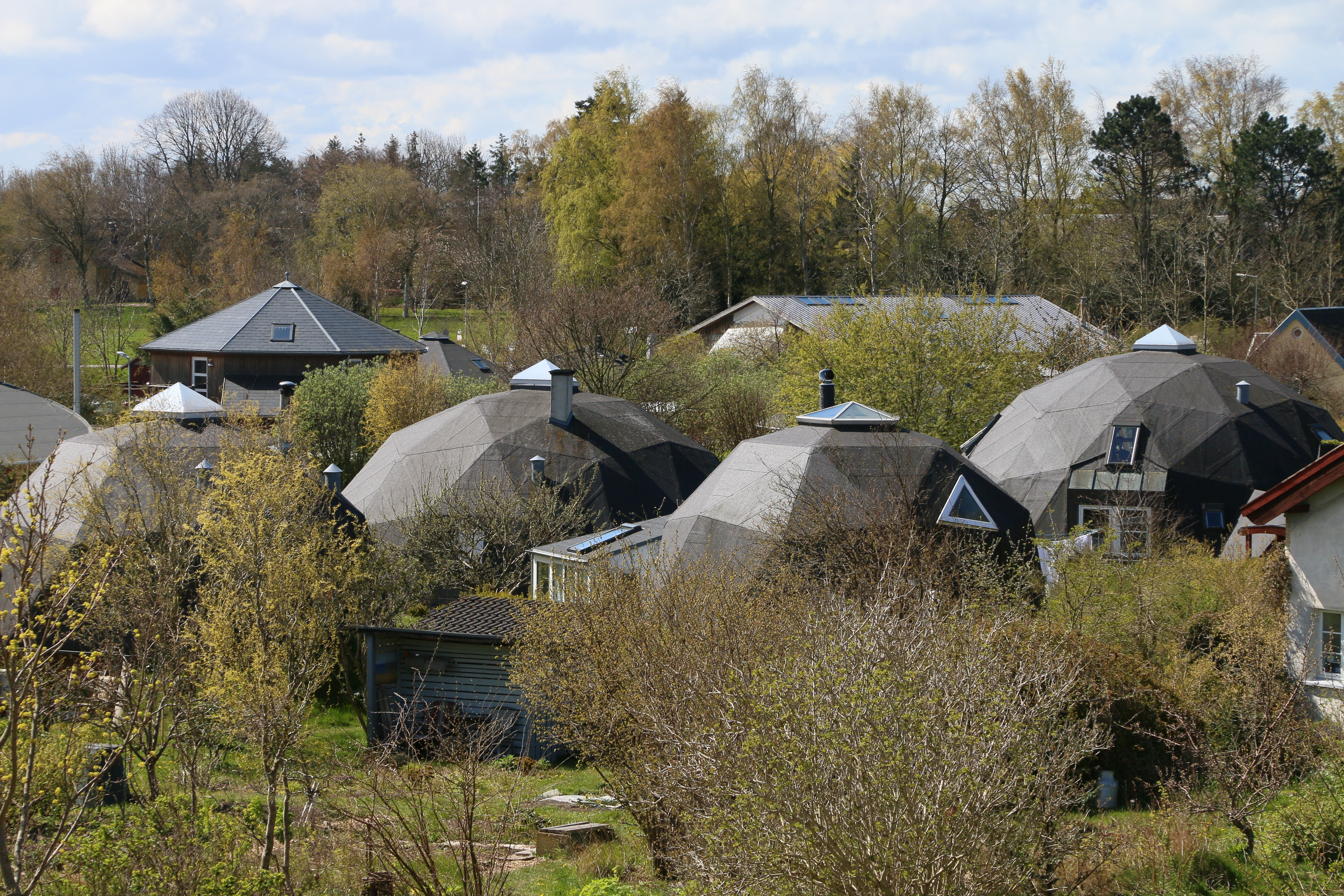
- Domes in Dyssekilde ecovillage in Torup

- Location within Denmark Location within Capital Region
- Coordinates: 55°58′58″N 11°56′31″E
- Country: Denmark
- Region: Capital Region
- Municipality: Halsnæs

Population (2026)
  - Urban: 409
- Time zone: UTC+1 (GMT)
- Postal code: 3390 Hundested

Torup is a village located on the Halsnæs peninsula in North Zealand, Denmark.

The village is located midway between the towns of Frederiksværk and Hundested, some 60 km north of Copenhagen, Denmark. It is located in Halsnæs Municipality, in the Capital Region of Denmark. As of 1 January 2026, the population was 409.

The village was originally the main town on the Halsnæs peninsula, probably arising around Torup Church from the 12th century, which is still the main church in Torup Parish. Later, Hundested became by far the largest town on Halsnæs. The village is served by Dyssekilde railway station, which is on the Frederiksværk Line between Hillerød and Hundested.

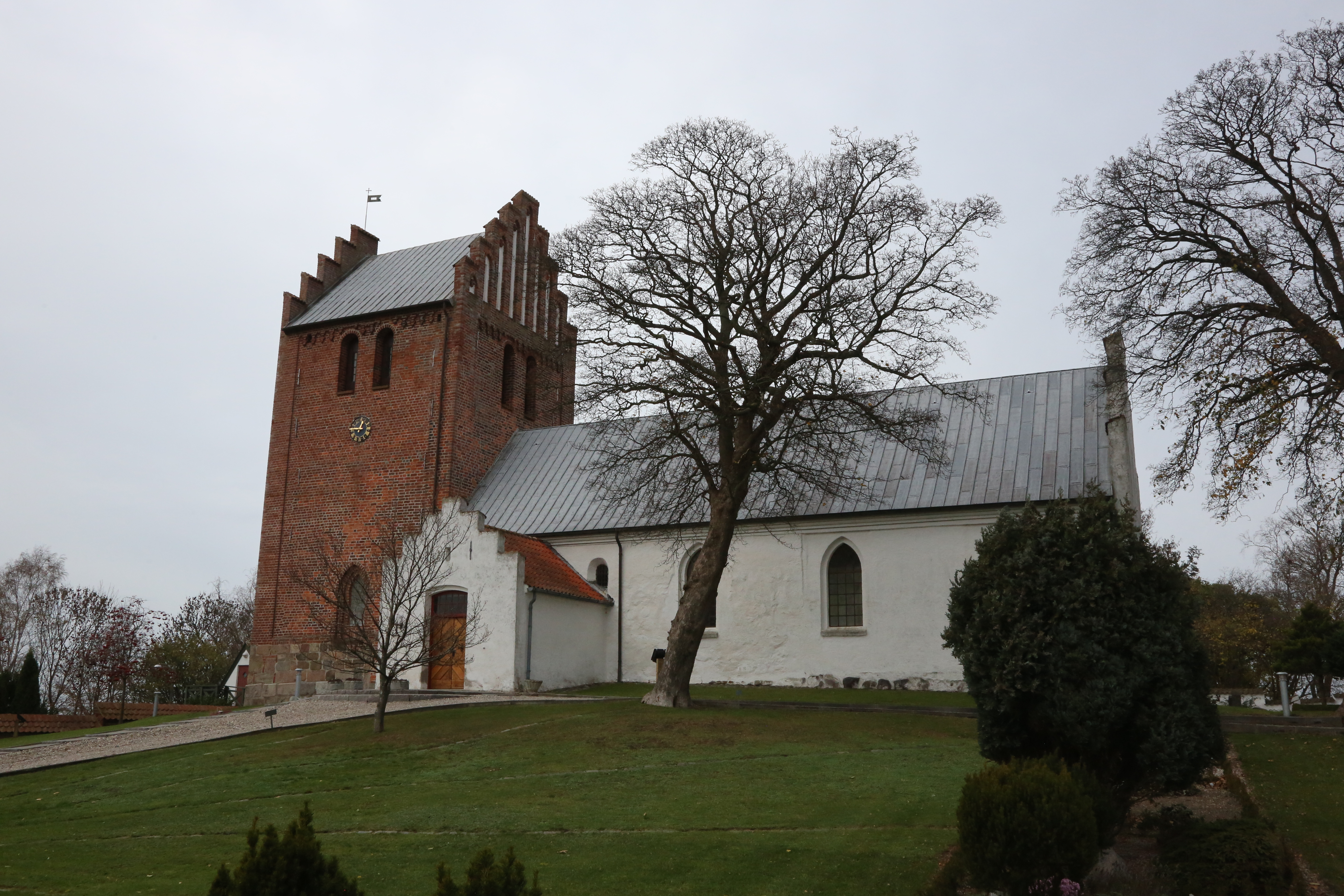
Torup Church

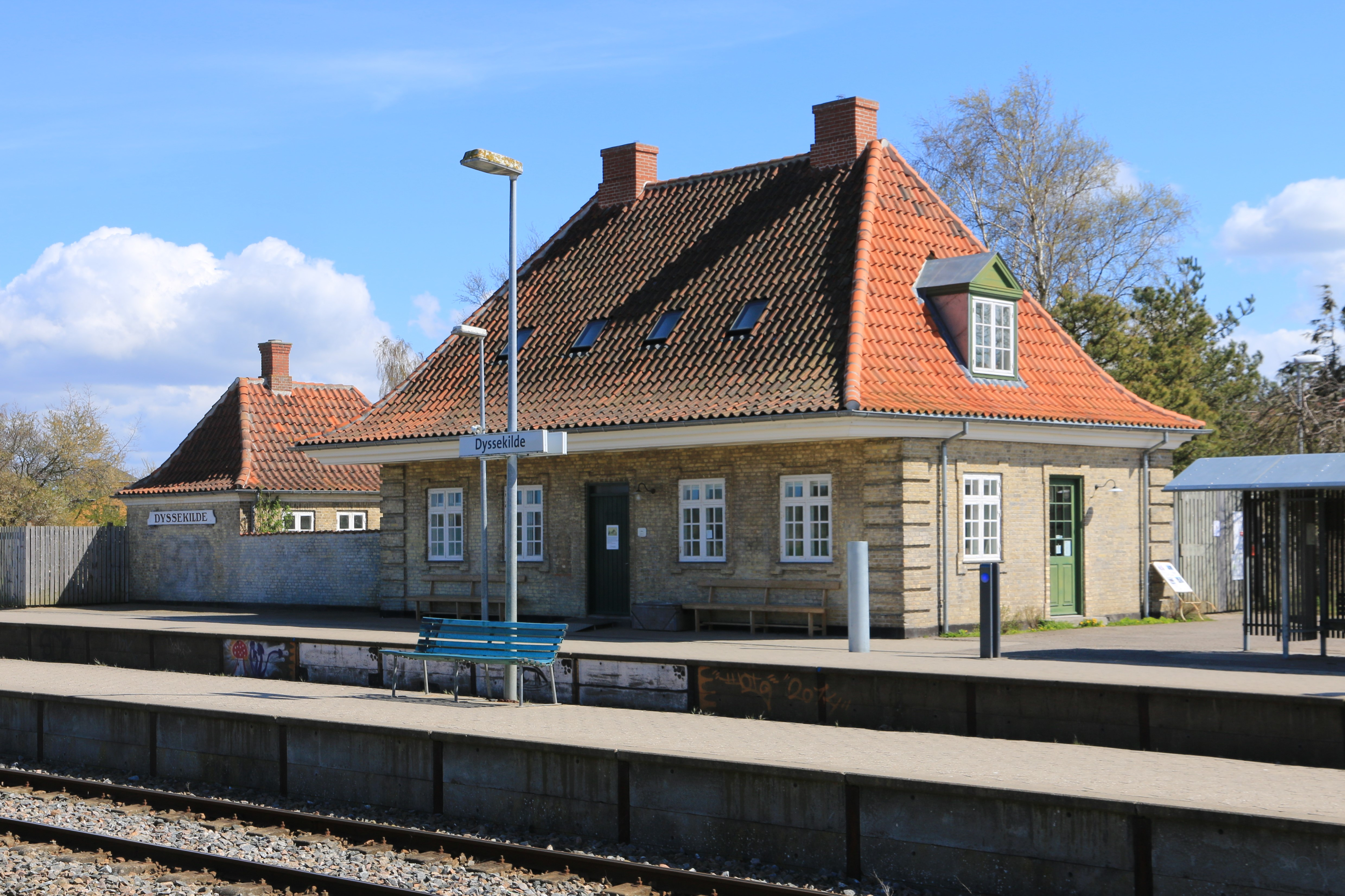
Dyssekilde railway station

== See also ==
- Torup Parish, Halsnæs Municipality
