= Frederiksværk railway station =

Railway station in North Zealand, Denmark

Frederiksværk
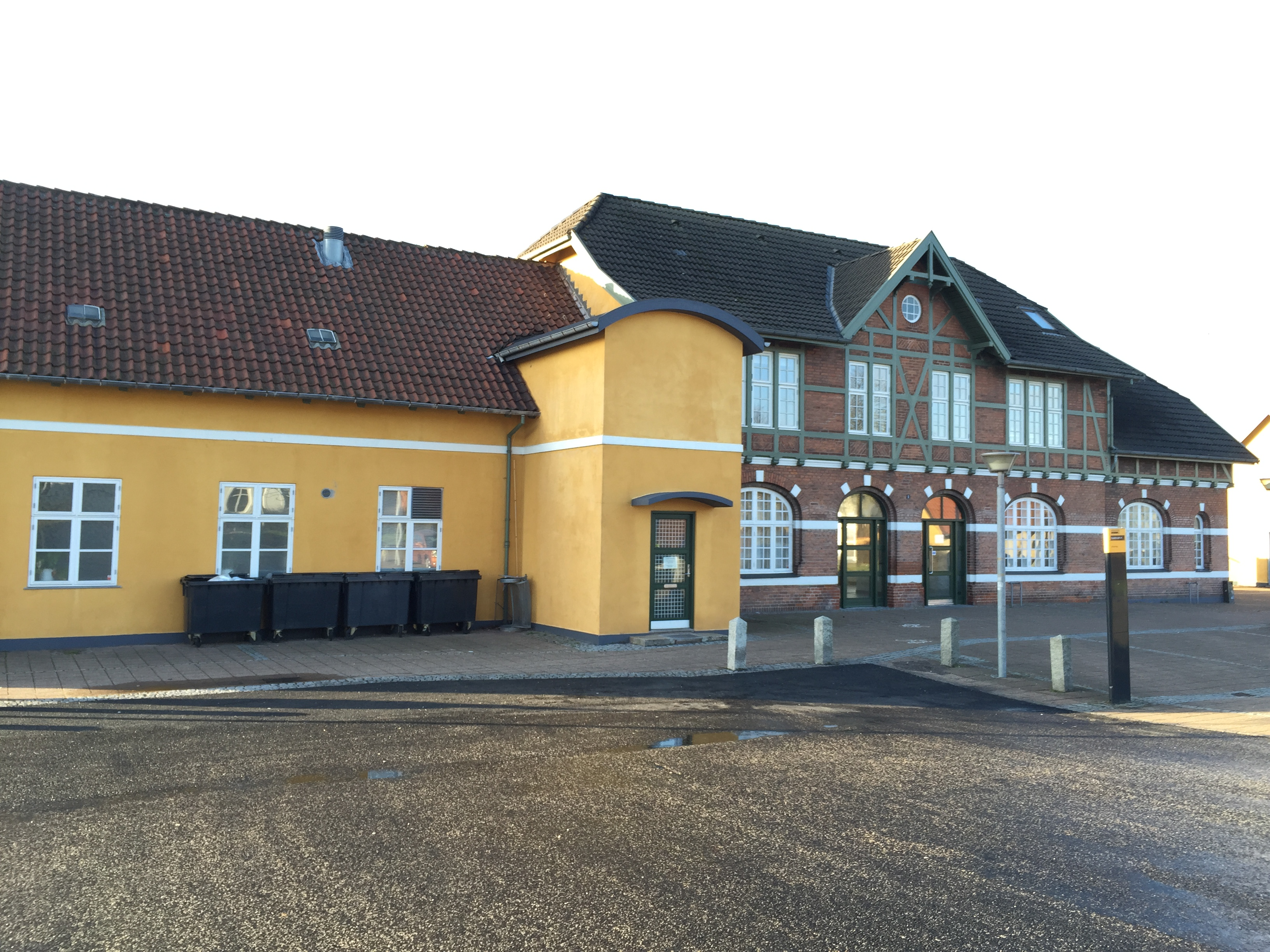
- Frederiksværk Station in 2015

General information
- Location: Stationspladsen 1; 3300 Frederiksværk; Halsnæs Municipality; Denmark
- Coordinates: 55°58′6.98″N 12°1′10.23″E
- Elevation: 3.6 metres (12 ft)
- Owner: Hovedstadens Lokalbaner
- Operator: Lokaltog
- Line: Frederiksværk Line

History
- Opened: 31 May 1897

Services
Preceding station	Lokaltog	Following station
Lille Kregme towards Hillerød	Frederiksværk Line Local train	Hanehoved towards Hundested Harbour
Location

Frederiksværk station is a railway station serving the town of Frederiksværk in North Zealand, Denmark.

Frederiksværk station is located on the Frederiksværk Line from Hillerød to Hundested. The station was opened in 1897 with the opening of the Hillerød-Frederiksværk section of the Frederiksværk Line. The train services are operated by the railway company Lokaltog which runs frequent local train services between Hundested station and Hillerød station.

== Cultural references ==
The station was used as a location in the 1946 film Op med lille Martha.

== See also ==
- List of railway stations in Denmark
