= Torup Parish, Halsnæs Municipality =

Parish in Halsnæs Municipality, Denmark

Torup Parish Torup Sogn
- Parish
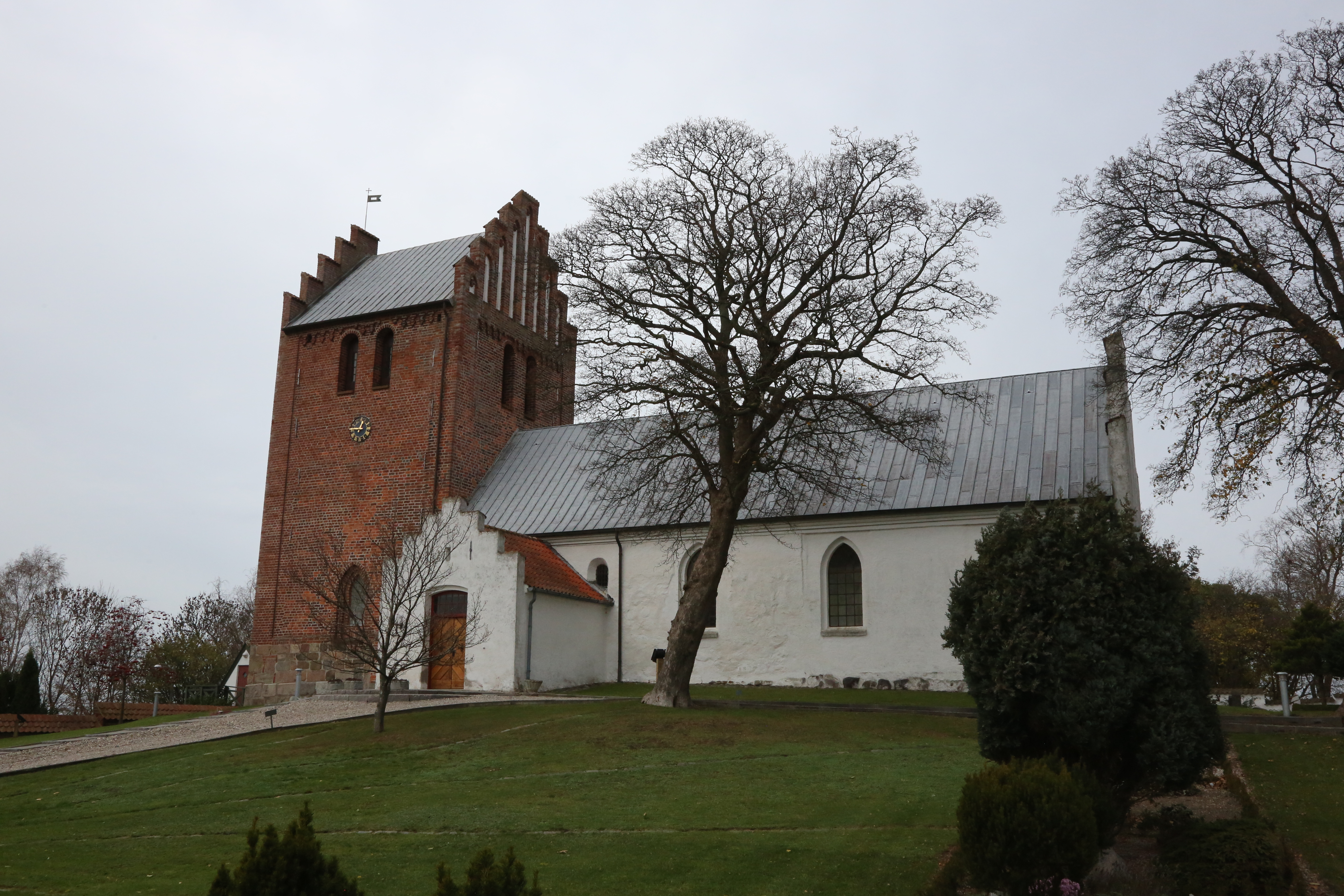
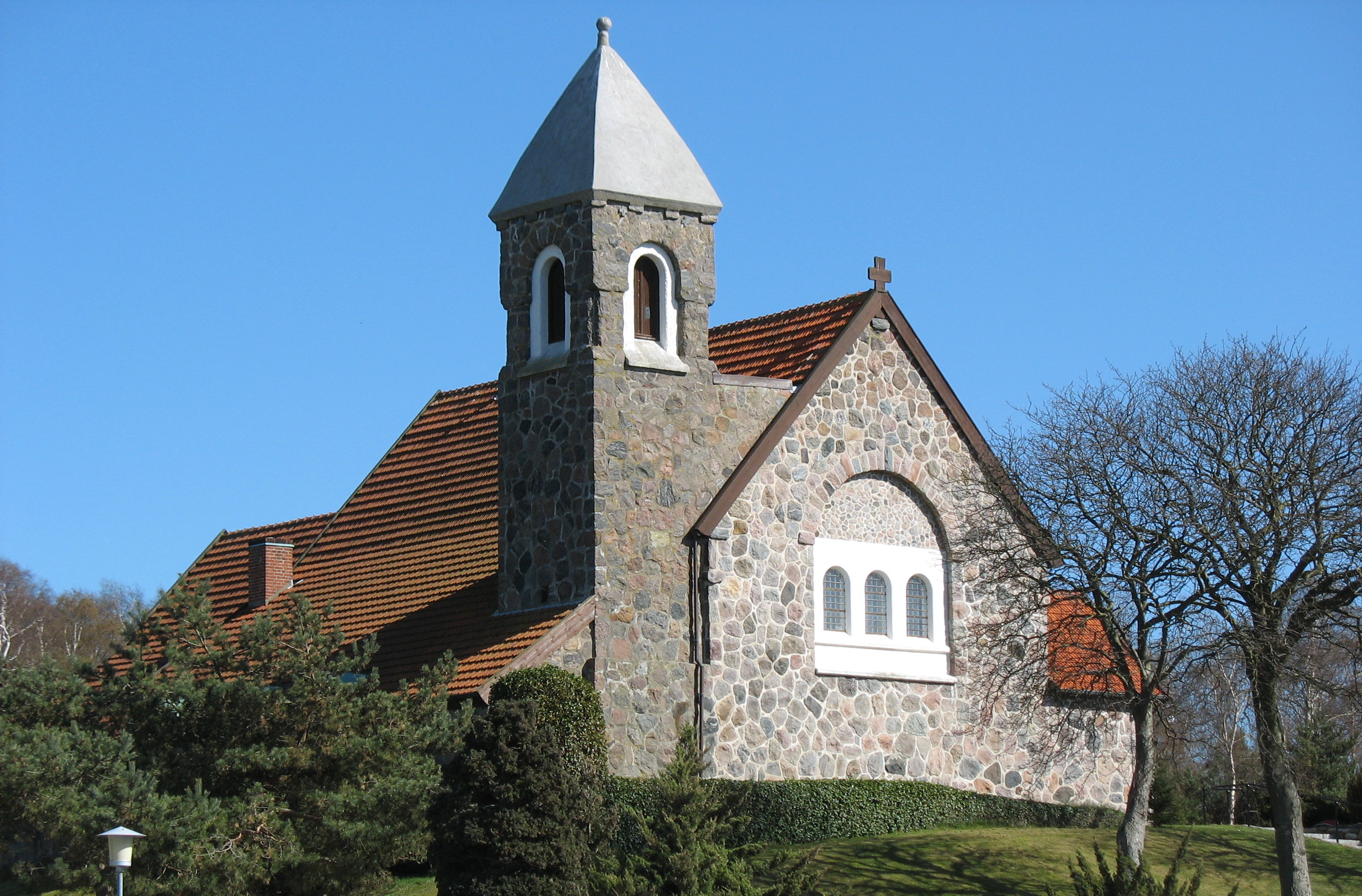
- Torup Church (left), Lynæs Church (right)
- Interactive map of Torup Parish
- Coordinates: 55.9828°N 11.9419°E
- Country: Denmark
- Region: Capital
- Municipality: Halsnæs Municipality
- Diocese: Helsingør

Population (2025)
  - Total: 9,615
- Parish number: 7408

Torup Parish (Danish: Torup Sogn) is a parish in the Diocese of Helsingør in Halsnæs Municipality, Denmark. The parish contains the town of Hundested and the village of Torup.
