= Hundested RK =

Danish rugby club

- Full name: Hundested Rugby Klub (as Hundested Skole Rugby)
- Nickname: Hundene (Seals)
- Founded: 1985
- Location: Hundested, Denmark
- Ground: Hundested Rugby Stadion
- President: Thomas Thiede (also player-coach)
- League: DRU Division One East
Team kit

Hundested RK is a Danish rugby club in Hundested. They currently play in DRU Division One East.

== History ==
The club was founded in 1985 by a teacher called Peter Rohde, who began teaching at the town's Storebjerg (Big Mountain) School. In the early years, the club had only junior teams, but started competing at senior level in 1988. This brought about a name change from Hundested Skole Rugby to Hundested Rugby Klub. They also got their own field in that same year, having played at Storebjerg School and various football fields prior to that.
