= Arresø =

Lake in Denmark

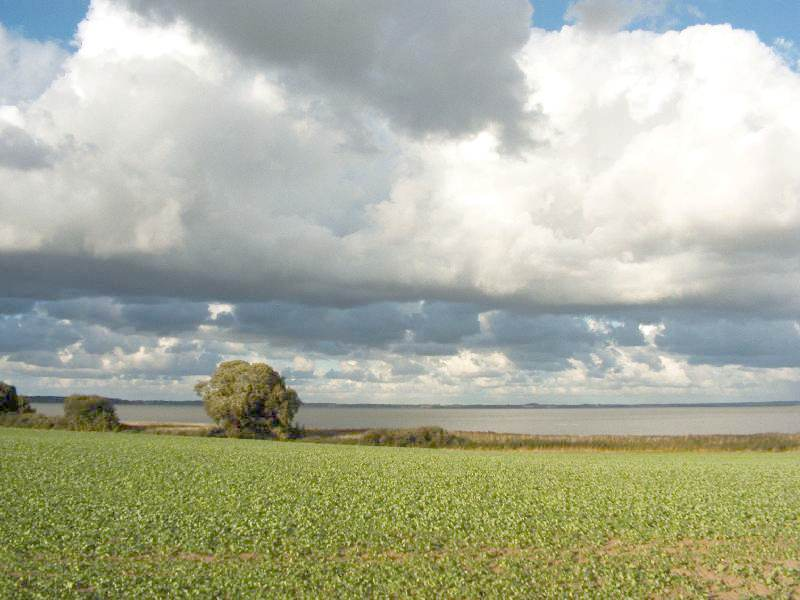

- Location within Denmark
- Location: Hovedstaden region
- Coordinates: 56°00′00″N 12°04′00″E
- Primary inflows: Pøleå
- Primary outflows: Arresø Canal
- Catchment area: 216.1 km^{2} (83.4 sq mi)
- Basin countries: Denmark
- Surface area: 40.72 km^{2} (15.72 sq mi)
- Average depth: 3.1 m (10 ft)
- Max. depth: 5.6 m (18 ft)
- Residence time: 3.1 years
- Surface elevation: 3.9 m (13 ft)
- Settlements: Ølsted, Frederiksværk

Arresø (Danish pronunciation: [ˈɑːɑˌsøˀ]) is the largest lake, by area, in Denmark. It covers 40,72 km^{2} (15.39 sq mi) and is situated on the island of Zealand 43 kilometers (27 miles) northwest of Copenhagen as the crow flies.

Arresø is located in the northern parts of Zealand in the region of Hovedstaden just north of Ølsted and east of Frederiksværk. It is a part of the three municipalities Gribskov, Halsnæs, and Hillerød. The lake empties into Roskilde Fjord through the Arresø Canal in Frederiksværk. The artificial canal was begun around 1717 by royal command, and the work was carried out by Danish soldiers and Swedish POWs.

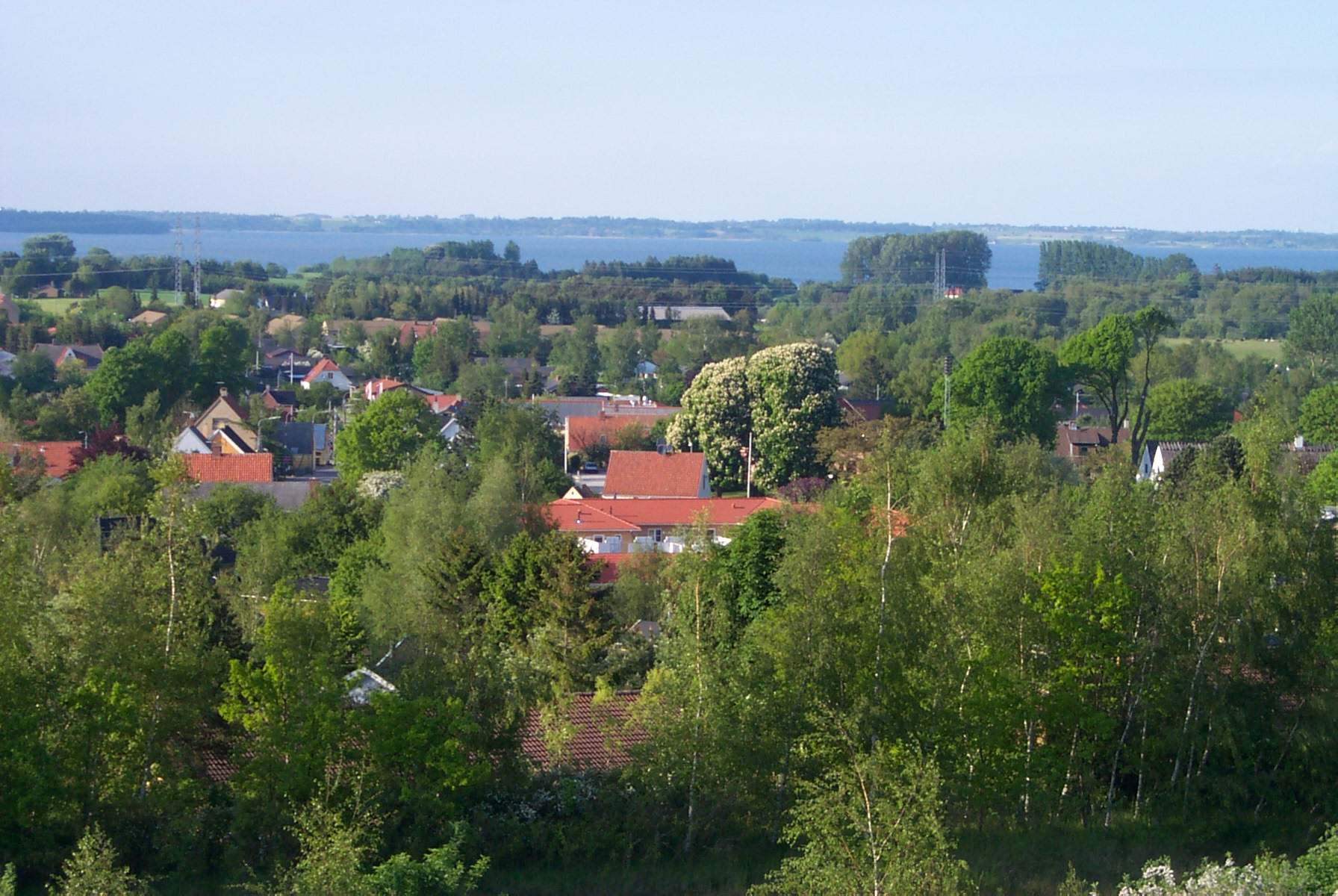
Ølsted rooftops with Arresø in the background. View direction is north.

There are a number of rivers and streams running into Arresø of which the Pøleå is the most significant. The landscape is especially hilly along the lake's west side. Among these ridges are Maglehøj in the town of Frederiksværk and Arrenakke Hills, which has views of the lake. East of Frederiksværk, the Arrenæs peninsula juts out into the lake.

Historically, Arresø was a fjord, having extended northwards as Brødemose Sund, connected to Kattegat, but the land northwest of here rose after the last Ice Age, locking the waters in and creating the lake.

Arresø has a rich bird and floral life. Sea eagles have returned as nesting birds, and beavers have been reintroduced. The lake is included in the Kongernes Nordsjælland National Park.

The renovated wooden ship M/S Frederikke offers boat tours on the lake between May and September, embarking from Arresødal.

== Sources ==
- Arresø Danish Nature Agency (in Danish)
- http://www.msfrederikke.dk/
