= Hesselø =

Danish island in Kattegat

Coordinates: 56°11′45″N 11°42′25″E

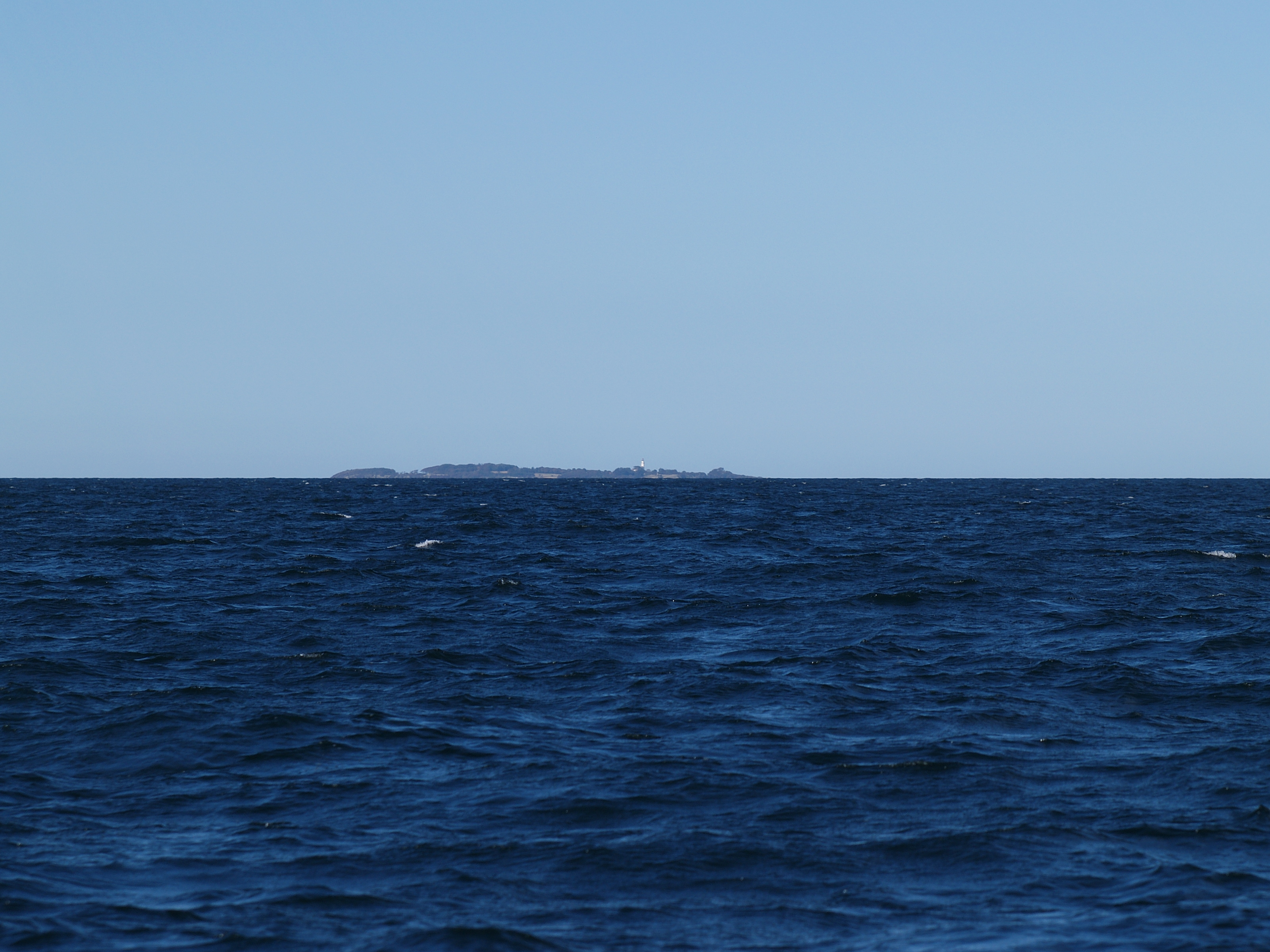

Geography
- Location: Kattegat
- Area: 0.71 km^{2} (0.27 sq mi)

Administration
- Denmark
- Region: Capital Region of Denmark
- Municipality: Halsnæs Municipality

Hesselø is a small island of Denmark, belonging to Halsnæs Municipality, in Region Hovedstaden. The island is situated in the Kattegat, about 25 nautical miles east of Grenaa on Jutland and 15 nautical miles northwest of Zealand, it has an area of 0.71 km^{2}.

The island got its name from the common seal (in Danish, sæl), which used to be very common on the island.

Hesselø was occupied by the English during the Napoleonic Wars.

In fiction, the Norwegian illustrator and author Tor Bomann-Larsen in the comic book '1905. The Duel at Hesselø' wrote that the Swedish and Danish princes duelled here for the unoccupied Norwegian throne.

Another 'duel' occurred in 1983 when the Danish government gave permission for test-drilling for oil north-east of the island against protests from Sweden.

The island is now privately owned and used as a holiday destination. The lighthouse was automated in 1955, and the island has been uninhabited since 2005.

A new offshore wind port is scheduled to be completed off the coast of Hesselø in 2027.
