= Per Winge (sport shooter) =

Danish sports shooter (1914–1989)

Personal information
- Born: 20 January 1914 Copenhagen, Denmark
- Died: 20 March 1989 (aged 75) Hundested, Denmark

Sport
- Sport: Sports shooting

Per Winge (20 January 1914 – 20 March 1989) was a Danish sports shooter. He competed in the 25 m pistol event at the 1952 Summer Olympics.
