= Kregme Parish =

Parish in Halsnæs Municipality, Denmark

Kregme Parish Kregme Sogn
- Parish
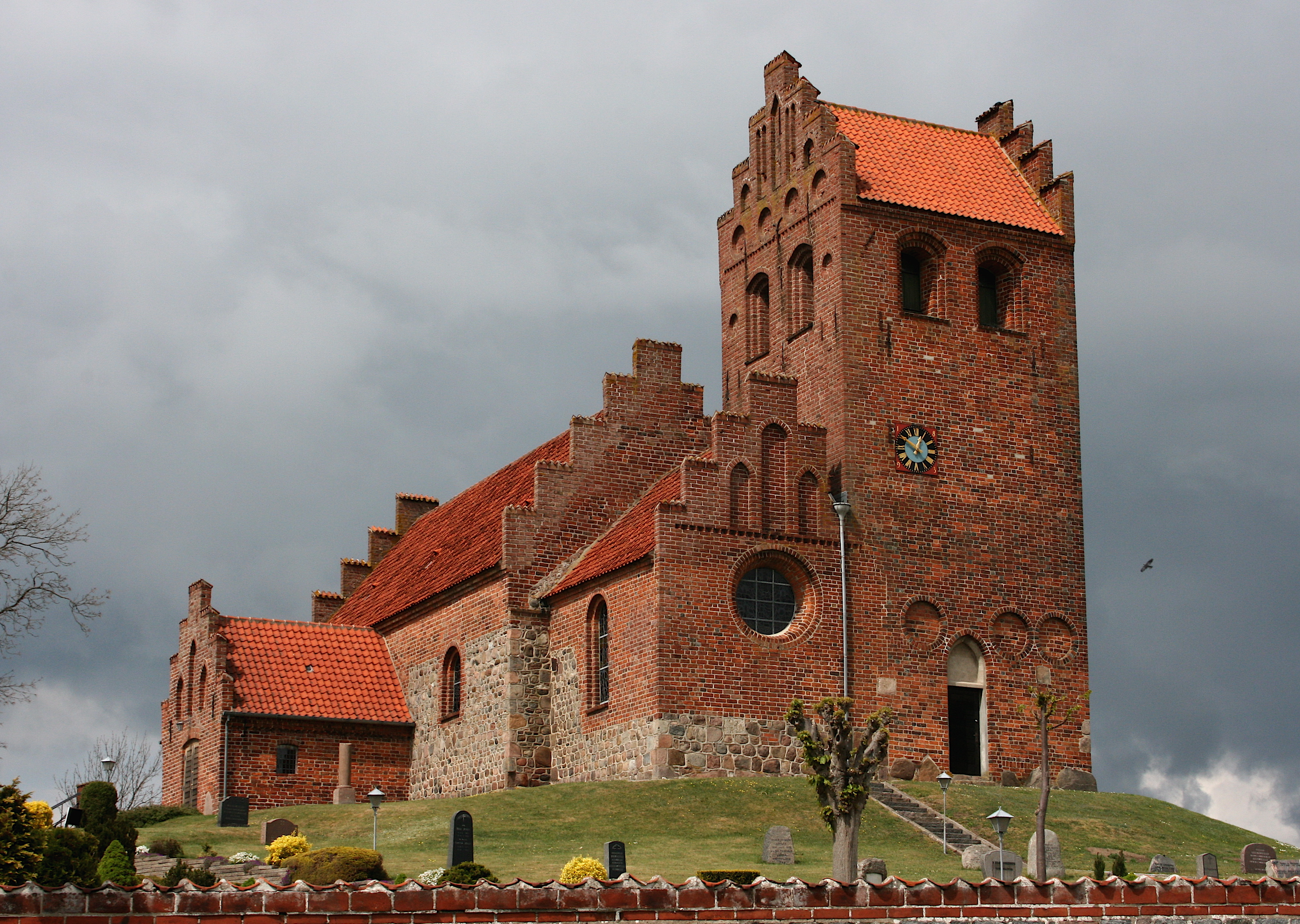
- Kregme Church
- Interactive map of Kregme Parish
- Coordinates: 55.95°N 12.05°E
- Country: Denmark
- Region: Capital
- Municipality: Halsnæs Municipality
- Diocese: Helsingør

Population (2025)
  - Total: 4,614
- Parish number: 7399

Kregme Parish (Danish: Kregme Sogn) is a parish in the Diocese of Helsingør in Halsnæs Municipality, Denmark.
