= Melby Parish, Halsnæs Municipality =

Parish in Halsnæs Municipality, Denmark

Melby Parish Melby Sogn
- Parish
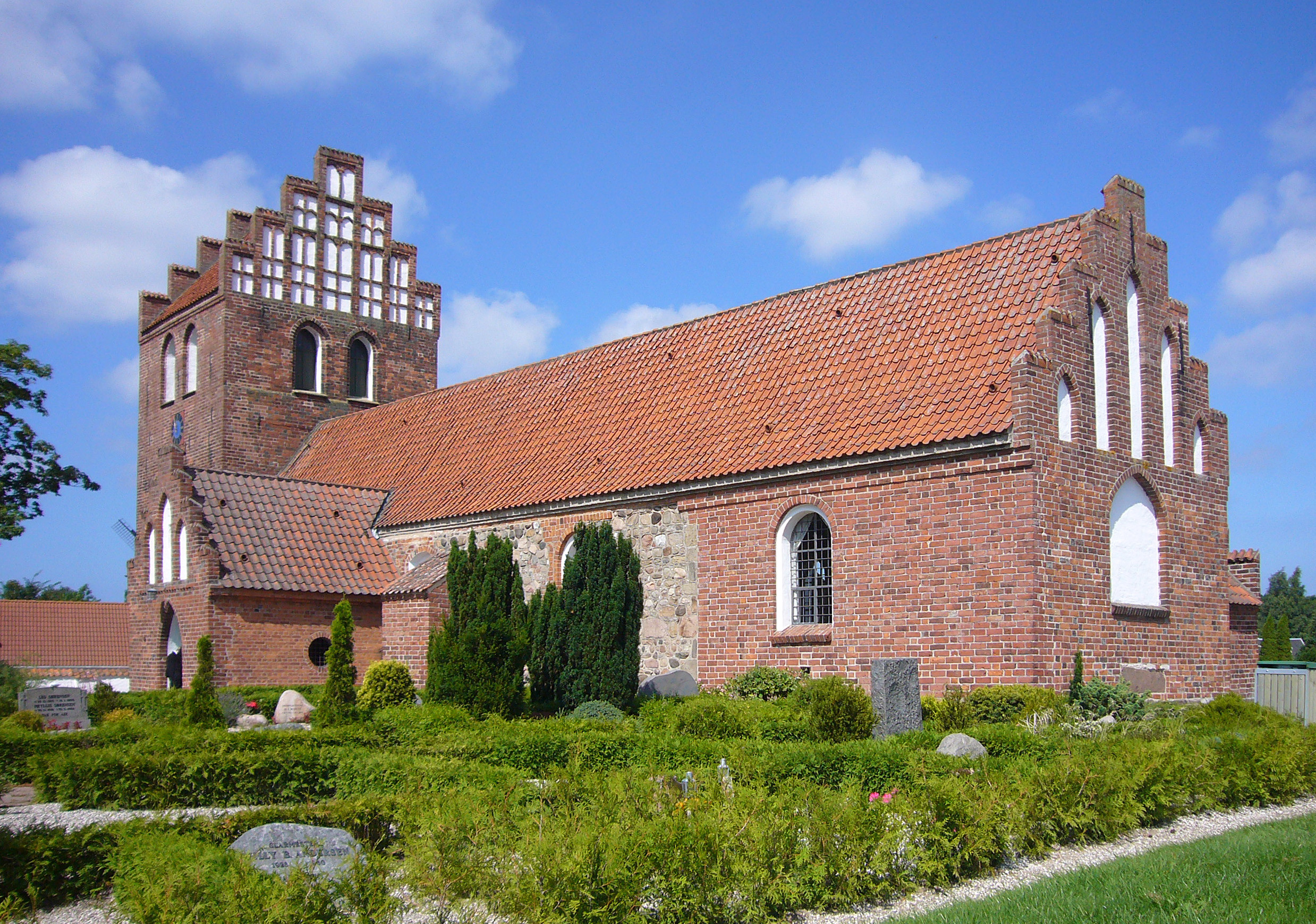
- Melby Church
- Interactive map of Melby Parish
- Coordinates: 56.00°N 11.97°E
- Country: Denmark
- Region: Capital
- Municipality: Halsnæs Municipality
- Diocese: Helsingør

Population (2025)
  - Total: 4,718

Melby Parish (Danish: Melby Sogn) is a parish in the Diocese of Helsingør in Halsnæs Municipality, Denmark. The parish contains the towns of Liseleje and Melby.
