= Ølsted Parish, Halsnæs Municipality =

Parish in Halsnæs Municipality, Denmark

Ølsted Parish Ølsted Sogn
- Parish
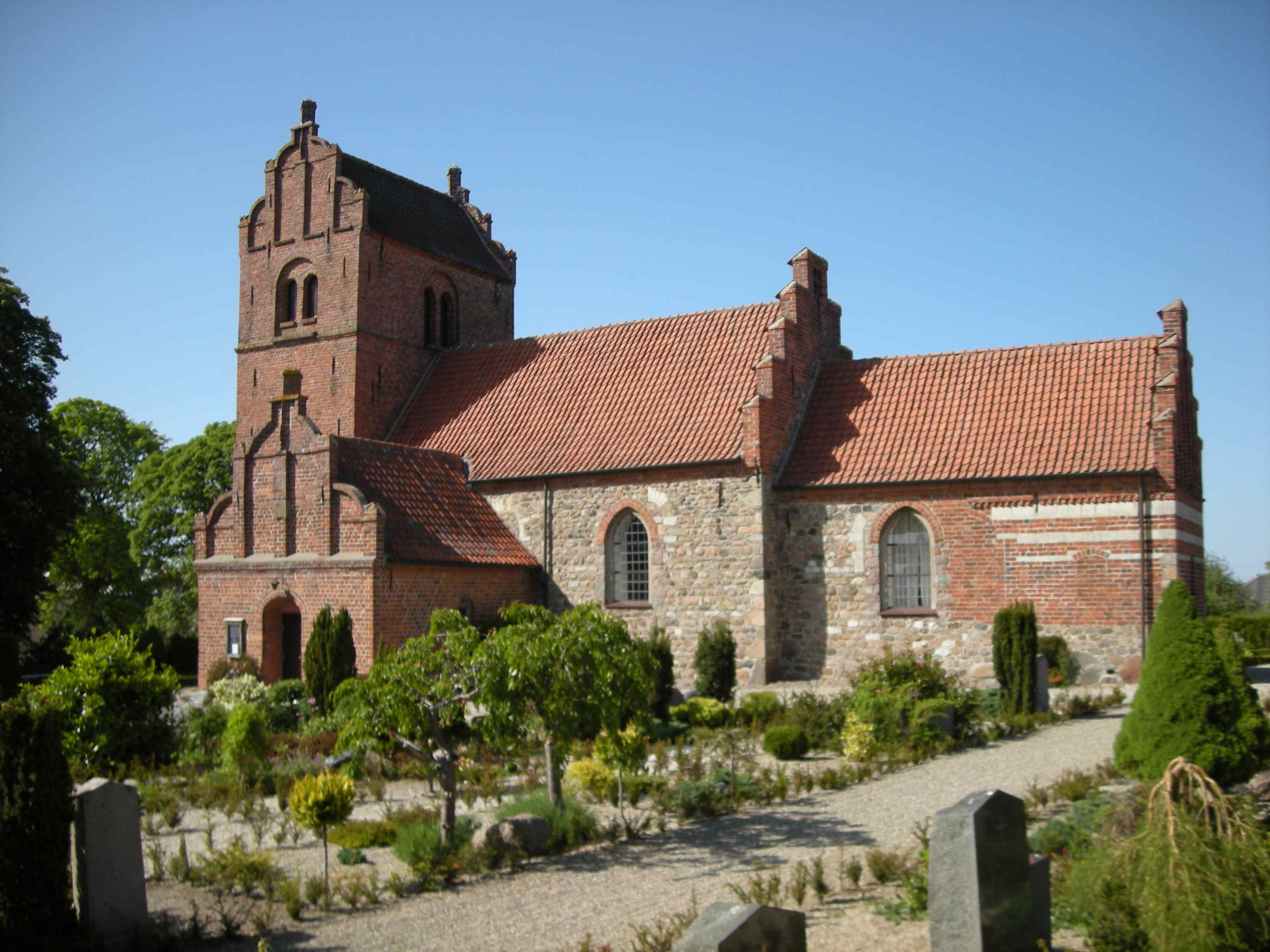
- Ølsted Church
- Interactive map of Ølsted Parish
- Coordinates: 55.92°N 12.07°E
- Country: Denmark
- Region: Capital
- Municipality: Halsnæs Municipality
- Diocese: Helsingør

Population (2025)
  - Total: 3,308
- Parish number: 7400

Ølsted Parish (Danish: Ølsted Sogn) is a parish in the Diocese of Helsingør in Halsnæs Municipality, Denmark. The parish contains the town of Ølsted.
