= Frederiksværk Line =

Railway line in Denmark

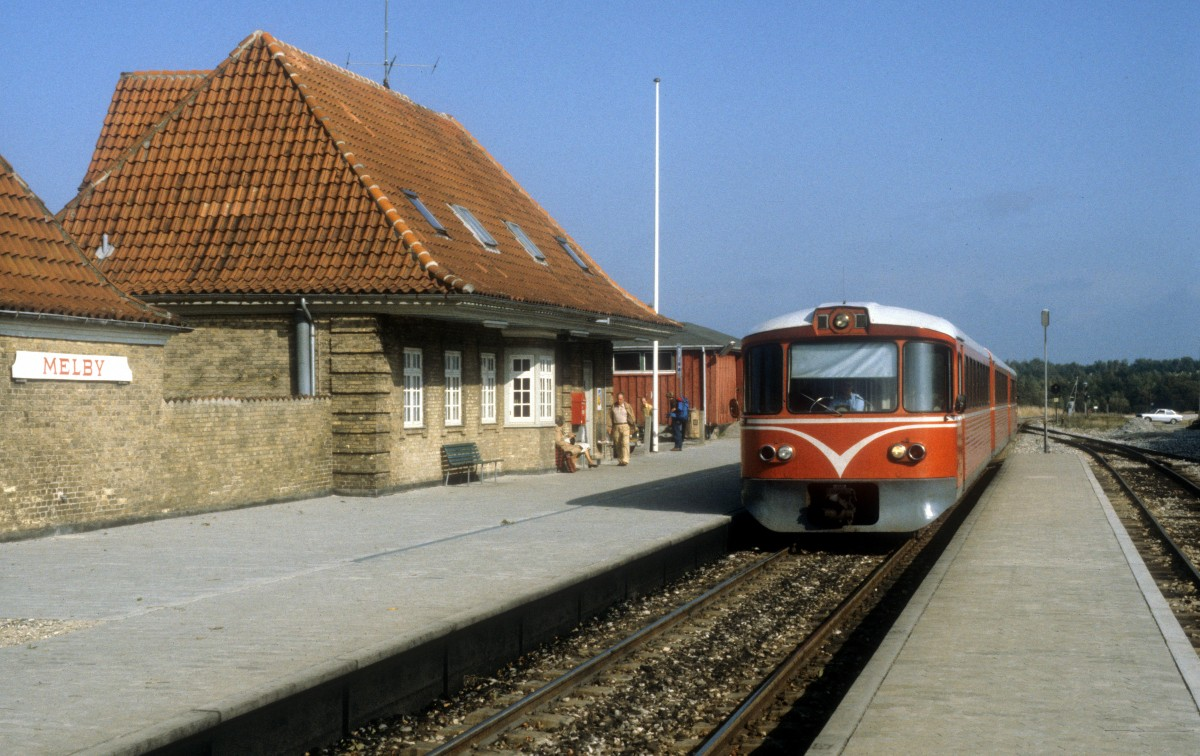
- A train at Melby Station

Overview
- Native name: Frederiksværkbanen
- Owner: Hovedstadens Lokalbaner
- Termini: Hillerød; Hundested
- Stations: 16

Service
- Type: Railway
- System: Danish railways
- Operator(s): Lokaltog

History
- Opened: Hillerød—Frederiksværk: 31 May 1897; Frederiksværk—Hundested: 21 December 1916

Technical
- Line length: 39.0 km (24.2 mi)
- Character: Local railway
- Track gauge: 1,435 mm (4 ft 8 1/2 in)
- Electrification: No
- Operating speed: 100 km/h (62 mph)
Route map
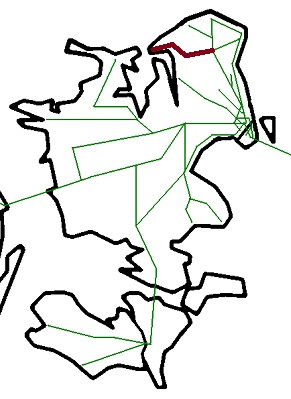

The Frederiksværk Line (Danish: Frederiksværkbanen) is a 39.0 km (24.2 mi) long standard gauge single track local passenger railway line in North Zealand, Denmark. It runs between Hillerød and Hundested. The name Frederiksværkbanen refers to the town Frederiksværk between Hillerød and Hundested.

The section from Hillerød to Frederiksværk opened in 1897, and the section from Frederiksværk to Hundested in 1916. The railway is currently owned by Hovedstadens Lokalbaner and operated by the railway company Lokaltog. Lokaltog runs frequent local train services from Hillerød station to Hundested station with most trains continuing from Hundested station to Hundested Harbour station to connect with the ferry to Rørvig in Odsherred.

== Former stations on Frederiksværk Line ==
- Borupgård Trinbræt

== See also ==
- List of railway lines in Denmark
