= Ølsted, Halsnæs =

Town in Halsnæs Municipality, Denmark

Ølsted
- Village
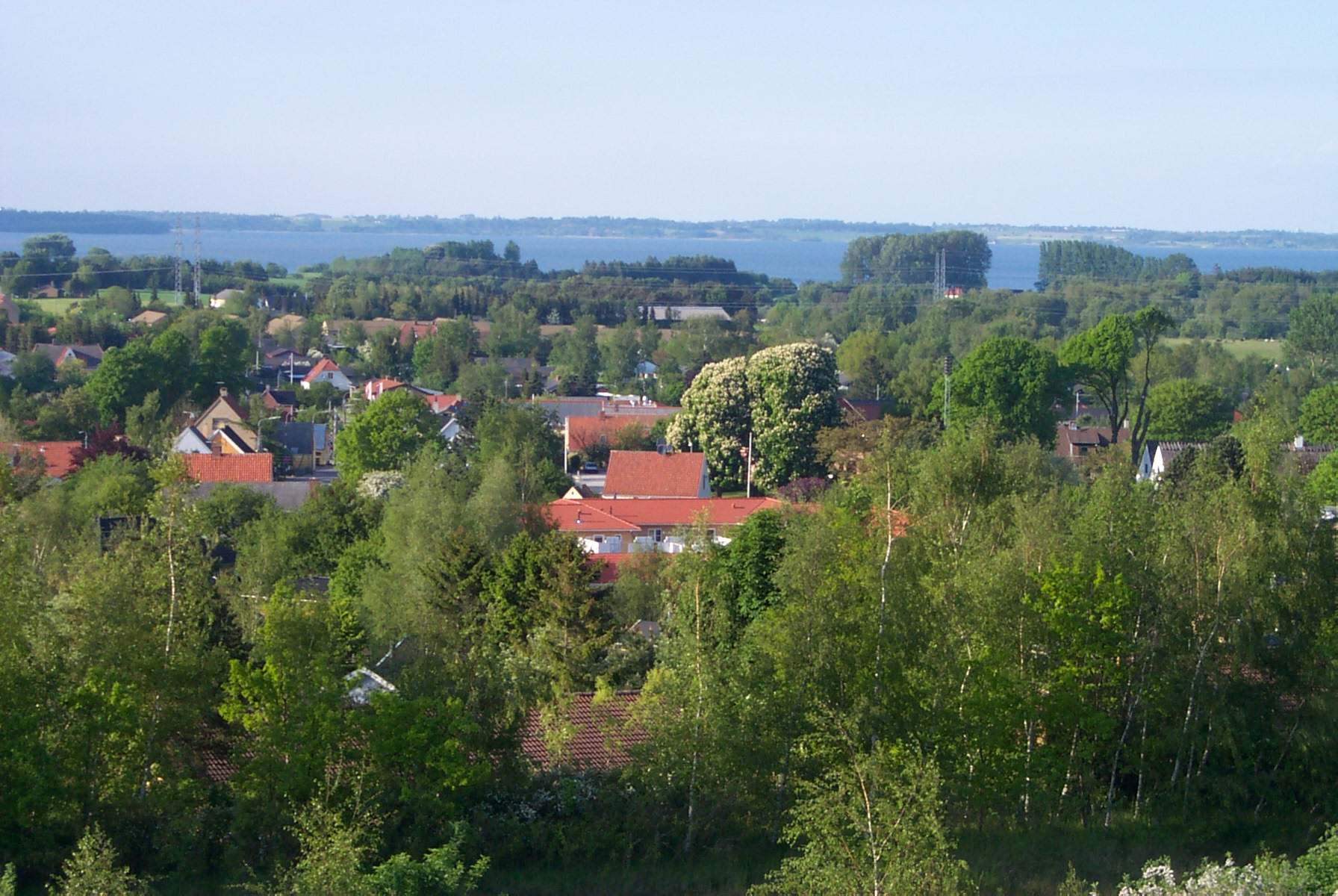
- Ølsted rooftops with Arresø in the background (looking north).

- Ølsted is northwest of Copenhagen Ølsted (Capital Region)
- Coordinates: 55°55′19″N 12°04′15″E
- Country: Denmark
- Region: Capital (Hovedstaden)
- Municipality: Halsnæs
- Parish: Ølsted Parish
- First documented: 1100

Area
  - Urban: 1.03 km^{2} (0.40 sq mi)

Population (2026)
  - Urban: 1,946
  - Urban density: 1,890/km^{2} (4,890/sq mi)
- Time zone: UTC+1 (CET)
  - Summer (DST): UTC+2 (CEST)
- Postal code: 3310

Ølsted is a small town located south of Frederiksværk, between Lake Arre to the northeast and Roskilde Fjord to the west, in Halsnæs Municipality, some 50 km northwest of Copenhagen, Denmark. As of January 1. 2026, the town has a population of 1,946. It belongs to the Halsnæs municipality in Region Hovedstaden.

== Geography ==
At the beach there are a large number of leisure houses which are also considered to belong to the city. About half of the population lives in the beach area, and the other half in the core town.

The hilly area to the south of Ølsted is known as Bakkerne (literally "The Hills"). It consists of meadows, a small peat bog and mixed deciduous forest. The name refers to the burial mound Rakehøj and the hills Vibjerg and Grævlingehøj.

== History ==
The village is very old, and was most likely founded before year 400 A.D., according to excavations done at Stokrosevej in April 2006. The oldest building that is still standing is currently the church, which is dated to be from approximately year 1100.

The name Ølsted means "Beerplace" and is believed to be the original meaning of the word. The village is located at the border of the wetlands just south of Arresø lake, where there has probably been a lot of traffic historically.

King Frederik IV of Denmark restructured his army in 1715–1718 in order to obtain a large but not too expensive army, because of the Great Nordic War which took place in 1700–1721. He designated 12 regions to provide cavalry, and one of them was Frederiksborg. Being a pietist, he also ordered each of these regions to build 20 schools each in very high quality for the education of the children in the regions, providing the first public schools in Denmark. This decision was made March 28, 1721, and all schools were established in 1727. One of these schools was built in Ølsted, and today this building is being used as an office for the local church. More information here.

== Church ==
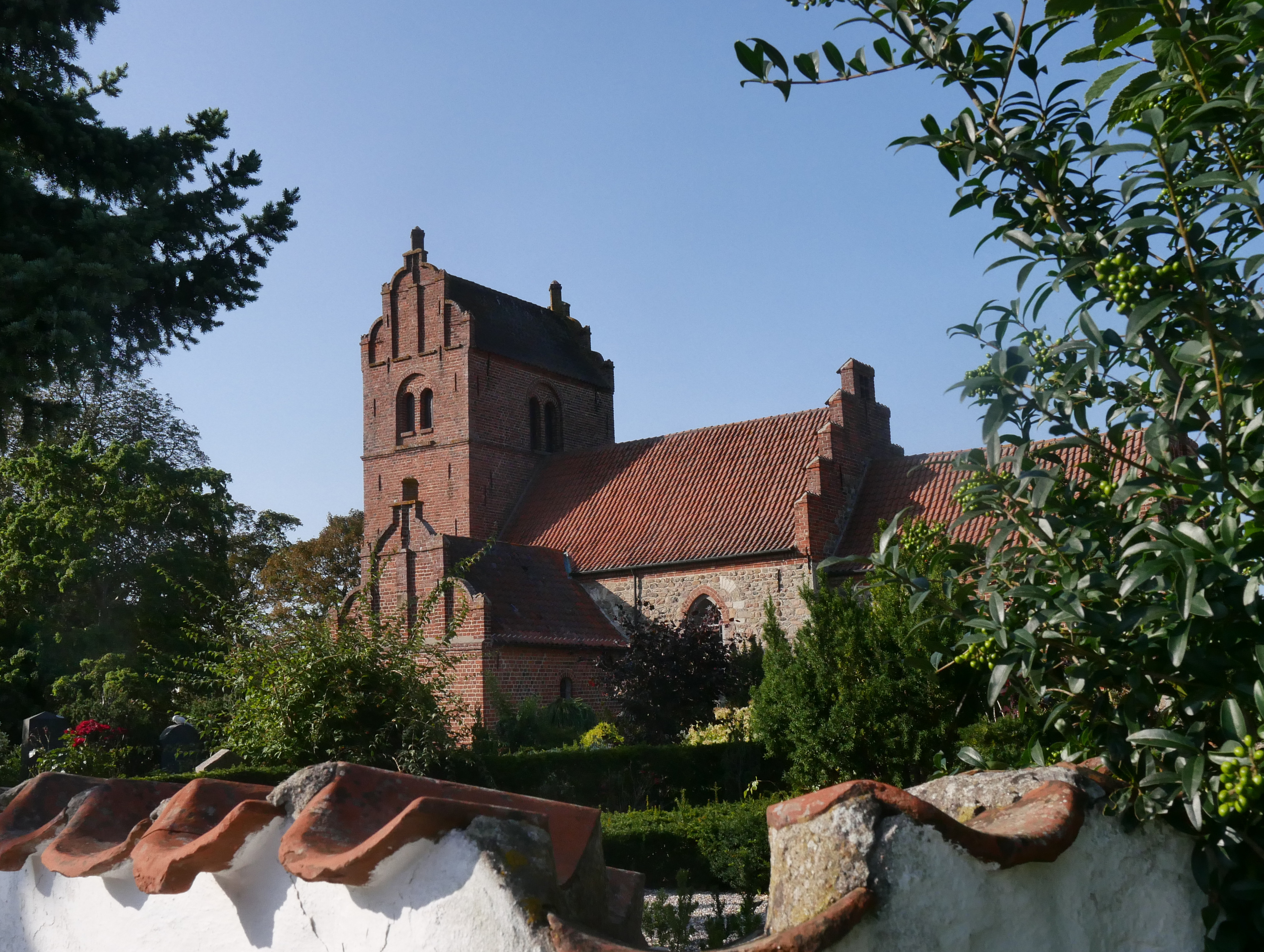
Ølsted Church

Ølsted Church dates from approximately 1100.

== Facilities ==
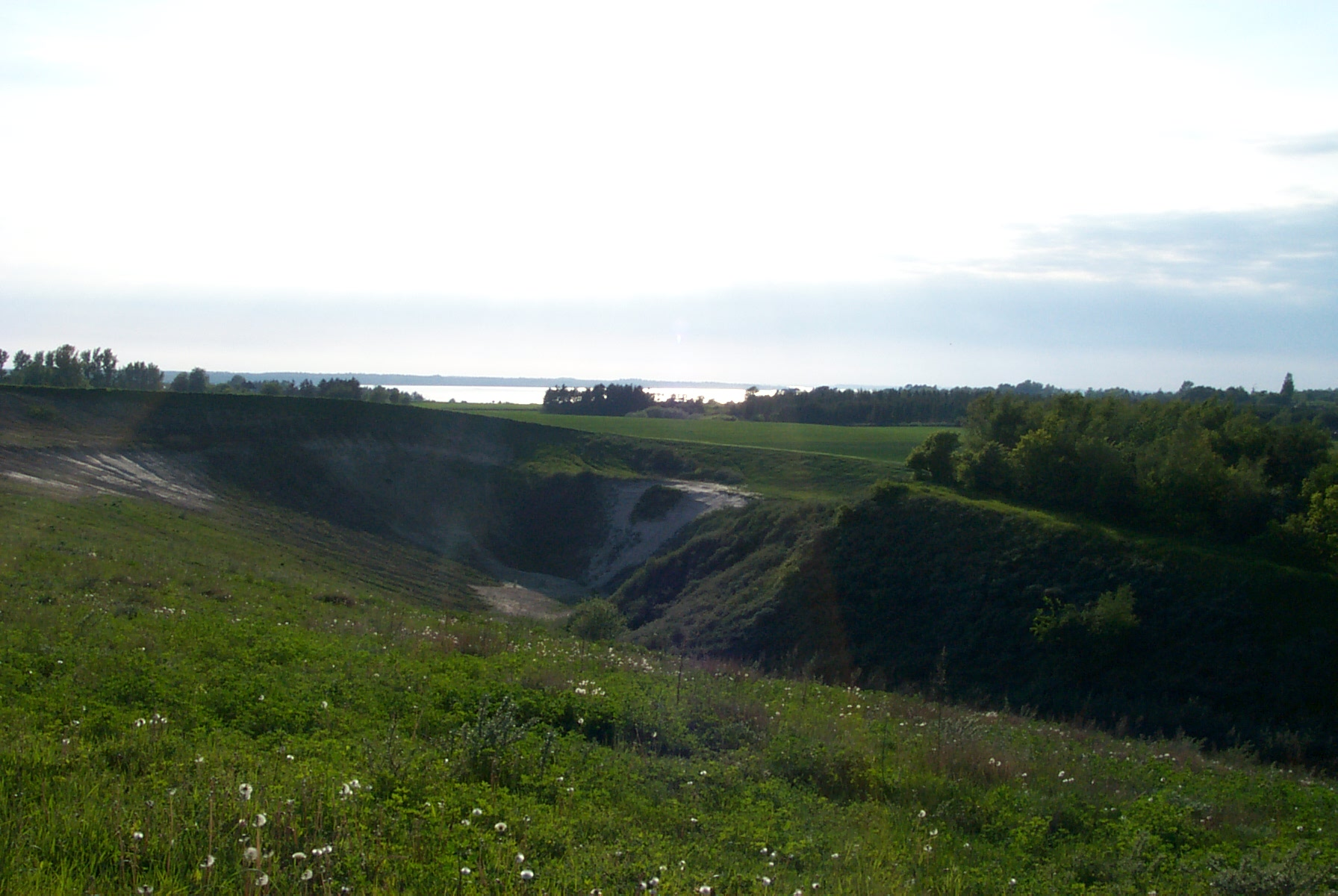
Gravel pit with Roskilde Fjord

The town has a good multi-purpose hall, where skaters, BMX-riders and inliners from all over the region come to join and practice. The place is called "Olliestedet", a name that comes from the skateboard trick ollie. The local BMX-riders protested against the name because the name relates to only skateboarding, even though the place is open for anyone. Every year, the locals hold a competition called "Olliestedet Open", which is a popular skateboard-event. Another multi-purpose hall for badminton, gymnastics, markets, celebrations and shows.

A former gravel pit is surrounding recreational facilities and paths. Other recreational facilities include Soccer fields at 3 different locations

== Other facilities ==
Other facilities include a primary school, a kindergarten, a SuperBrugsen and a Netto supermarket. Accommodations are available at Ølsted Kro, a 19th-century inn.

== Transport ==
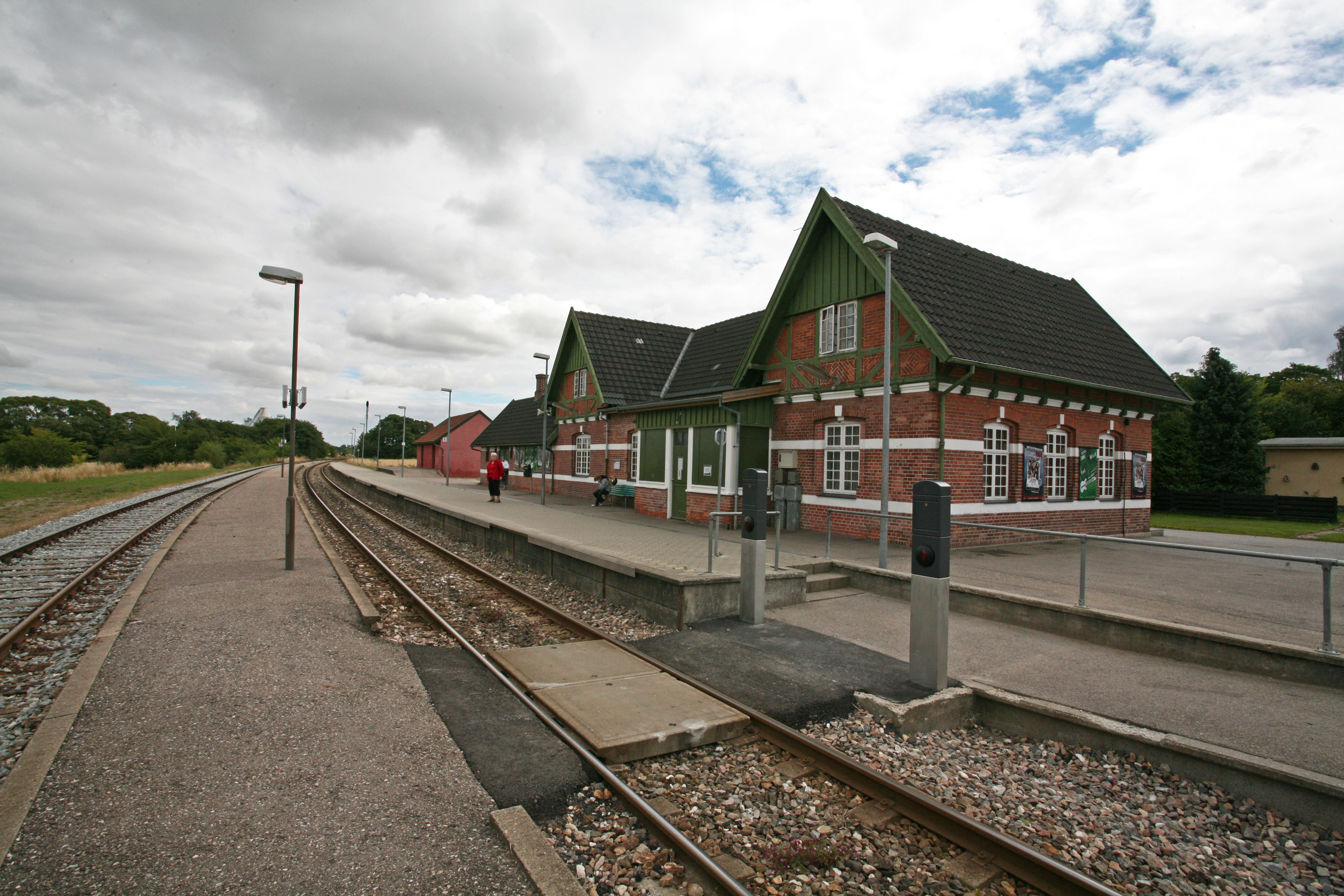
Ølsted railway station.

Ølsted railway station is served by the Lokaltog train route between Hillerød and Hundested. Ølsted is located close to the Danish national road 16.
