= Hundested =

- Town
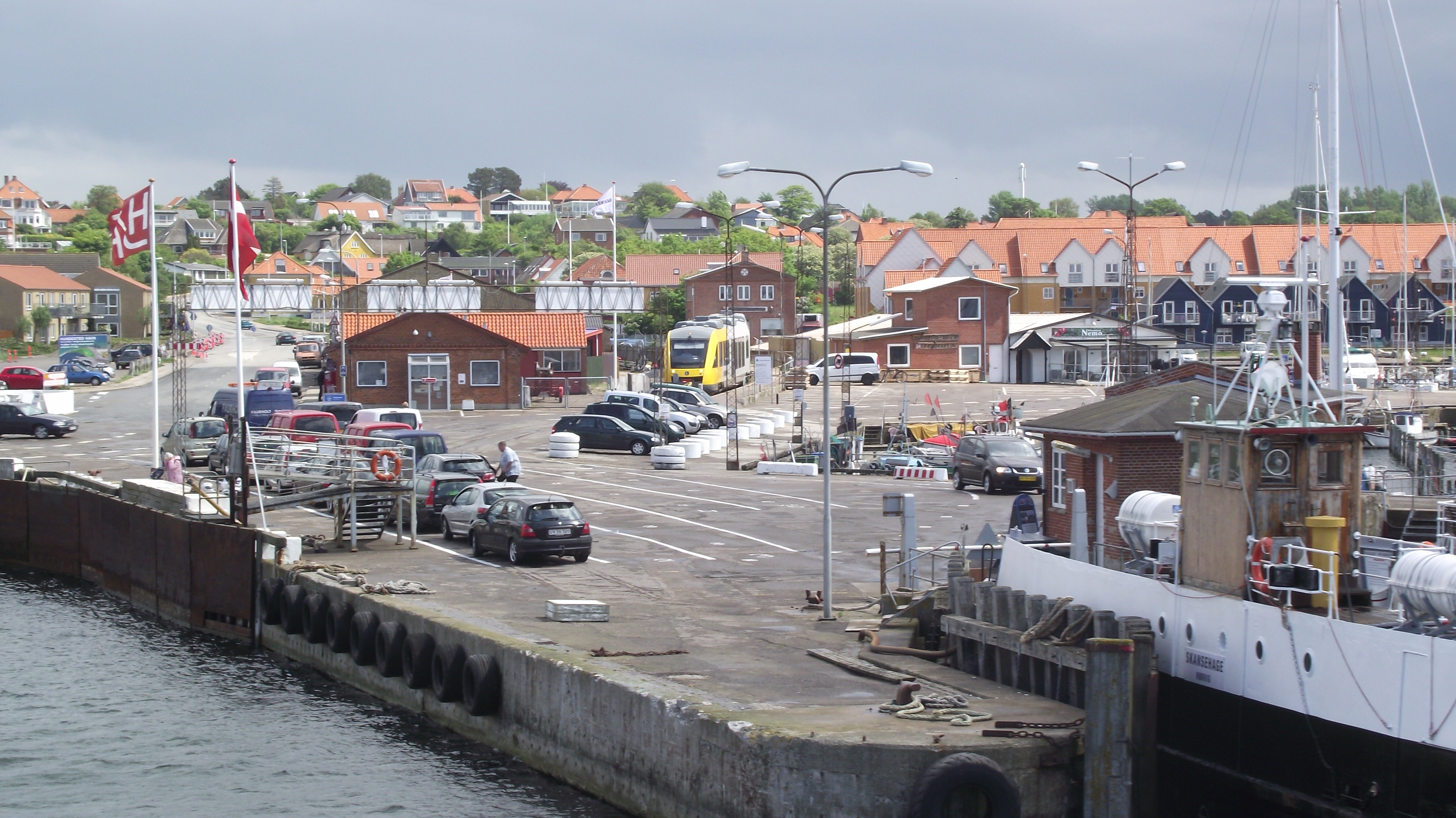
- The Rørvig ferry in the harbour

- Location within Denmark Location within Capital Region
- Coordinates: 55°58′N 11°51′E
- Country: Denmark
- Region: Capital Region
- Municipality: Halsnæs

Area
  - Urban: 7.6 km^{2} (2.9 sq mi)

Population (2026)
  - Urban: 8,609
  - Urban density: 1,100/km^{2} (2,900/sq mi)
  - Gender: 4,230 males and 4,379 females
- Time zone: UTC+1 (CET)
  - Summer (DST): UTC+2 (CEST)
- Postal code: DK-3390 Hundested

Hundested is a town with a population of 8,609 (1 January 2026) and a former municipality (Danish, kommune) in Region Hovedstaden in the northern part of the island of Zealand (Sjælland) in eastern Denmark.

The former municipality is surrounded by water on three sides: to the north is the Kattegat, to the west is the channel leading into the Isefjord, and to the south is Roskilde Fjord and the channel leading into it from the Isefjord.

The area is characterized by sand and dunes, especially on its northern side facing the Kattegat, but also found in the central areas and in the south. Kikhavn on the northern side of the peninsula, not far to the east of the town of Hundested, is the oldest fishing village in the area.

== Geography ==
Aerial view of Hundested and Isefjord

Hundested is situated at the tip of the Halsnæs peninsula which projects west from the northwestern corner of North Zealand, forming the west side of the entrance to Isefjord. The south coast of the peninsula is fronted by two cliffs which at Store Karlsminde Klint rises to 33 metres. It is located opposite the northern tip of Hornsherred, defining Kulhuse Rende, the one kilometer long entrance to Roskilde Fjord. To the west of Store Karlsminde Klint is the lower Skuldslev Klint which continues for about 1 kilometer to Lynæs Harbour. in the southern part of Hundested. The cliffs have formerly been subject to continuous erosion but is now sheltered by the harbor. The erosion has resulted in a shallow-watered area with water depths of only about one metre. To the east of Store Karlsminde Klint is a low area with coastal meadows, Sølager, which further inland gives way to forested slopes.

== History ==
The name Hundested is first mentioned as a field "Hundersted" in 1682. As a village only in a parish register from 1844.

The Halsnæs peninsula was formerly the site of several villages. Kikhavn was a fishing village from at 16th century. In 1776, Frederiksværk's founder, Johan Frederik Classen, established Grønnessegård manor on the peninsula in 1776, shutting down the villages of Gryndese, Rorup and Fornerup.

It is believed that the first building in present-day Hundested was a house for the local pilots built in the 1835.

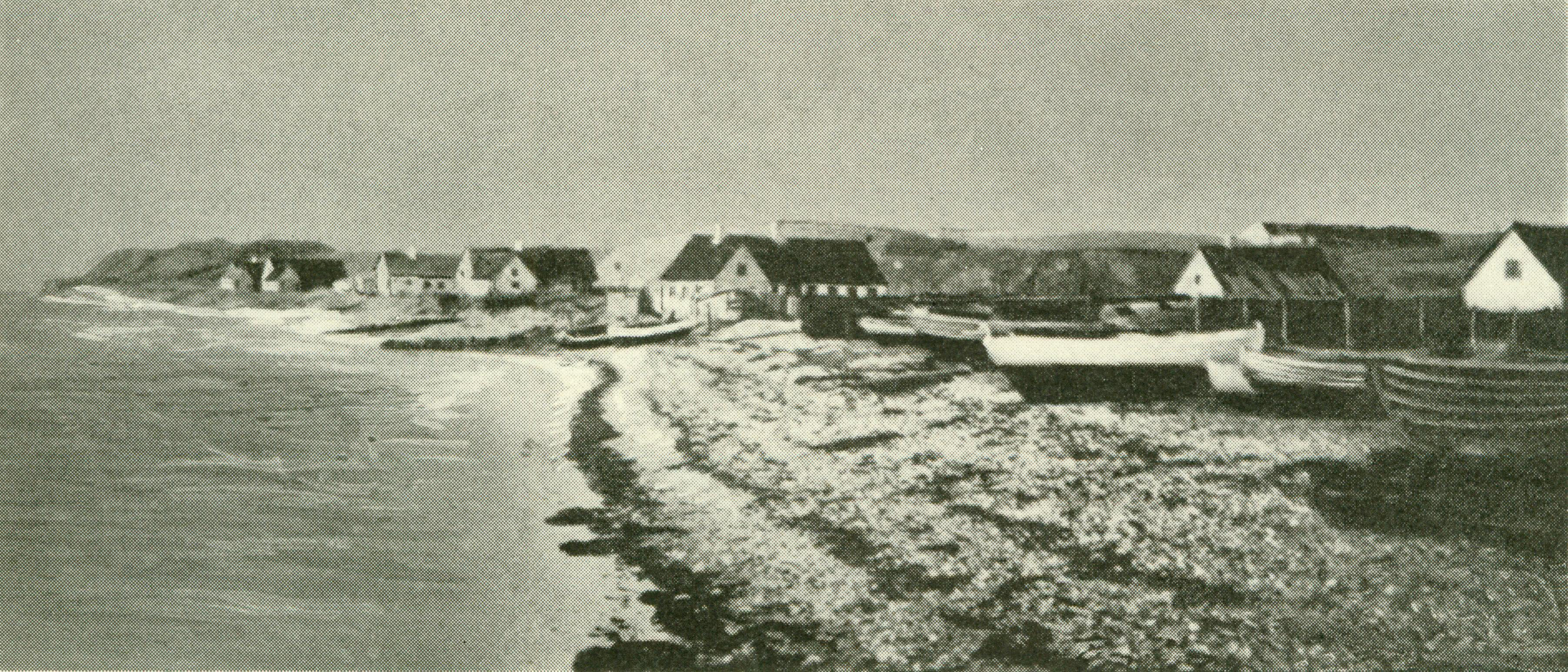
Hundested in about 1890

A breakwater (Læmolen) was built at Hundested in 1862 and Lynæs Harbour was built in 1872. It soon developed into the most important fishing port on Zealand and was expanded several times before most of the fishing vessels moved to Hundested Harbour in about 1910. Most of the fish was sold to traders from Frederikssund before the railway which opened in 1916 provided easy access to Copenhagen by way of Hillerød. The ferries to Rørvig began operating in 1927 and they were joined by the ferries to Grenå in 1934. The harbor attracted many new companies, including the fish auctions, an importer of coal, a canned food factory, dockwayd and Hundested Motor Factory which for generations produced reliable engines for Danish fishing vessels. A new industrial district was established in the eastern outskirts of town, attracting several companies from the plastic and metal industries in the 1960s and 1970s. The harbor was expanded with a new ferry terminal in 1967, a new freight terminal in 1987 and a new container terminal in 1995.

A downturn in the fishing industry in the 1980s hit Hundested hard and the freight and passenger lines to Grenå ceased operations in 1996.

On 1 January 2007 Hundested municipality ceased to exist due to Kommunalreformen ("The Municipality Reform" of 2007). It was merged with Frederiksværk municipality to form the new Frederiksværk-Hundested municipality. The name was changed to Halsnæs municipality on 1 January 2008. This created a municipality with an area of 120 km^{2} (46 sq mi) and a total population of 30,253.

== Economy ==
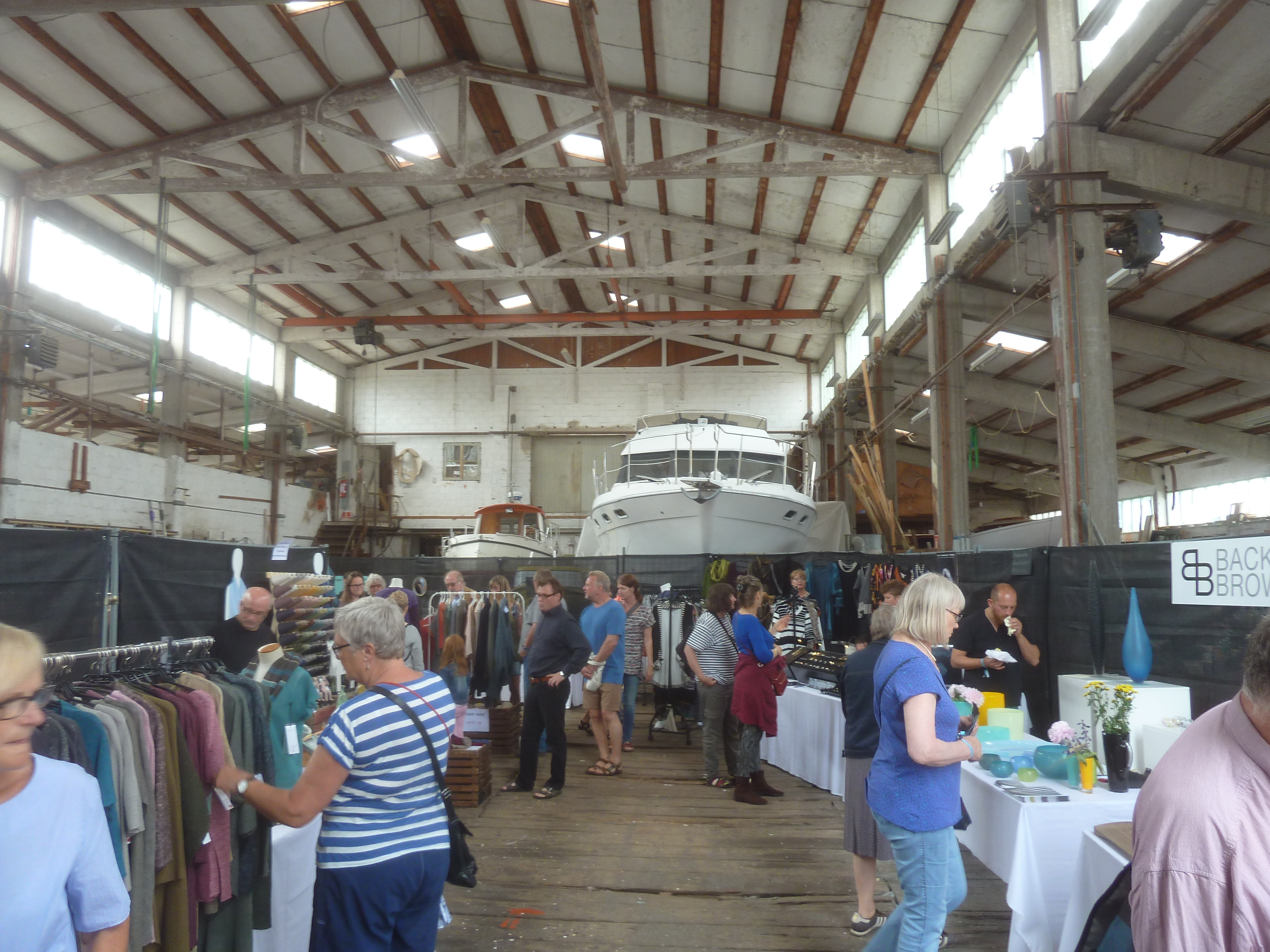
The Beddingen handicrafts market in 2015

Tourism plays an increasing role in the town's economy. The harbor is being promoted as a hub for arts and crafts with galleries and workshops. Glassmedjens was completed in 2008 and house a large glass workshop where glass blowers can be seen at work. An annual handicrafts market, Beddingen, takes place in June, attracting some 50 professional artists and craftsmen. Hundested is also home to an annual sand sculpture festival.

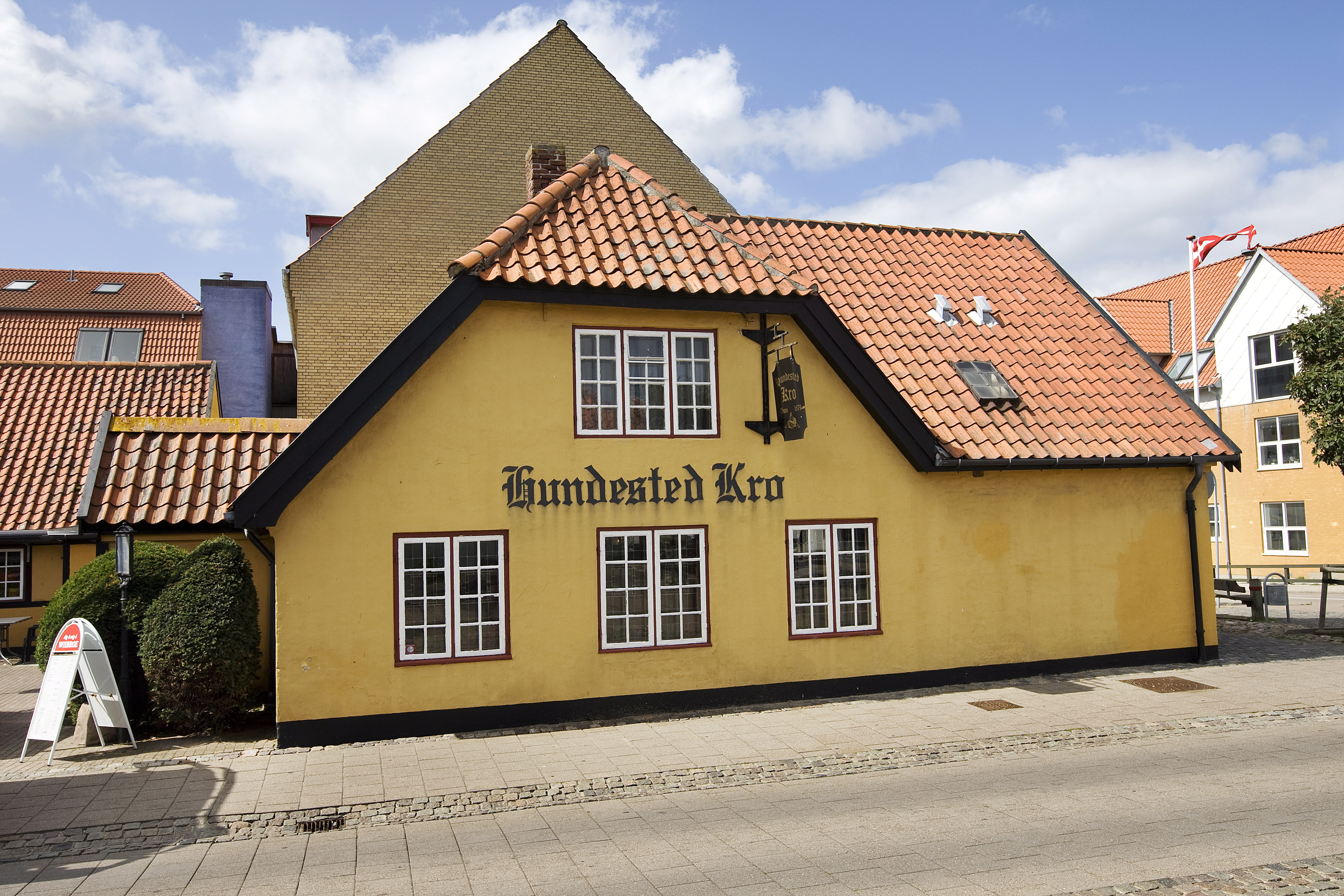
Hundested Kro

Port of Hundested is a member of Cruise Copenhagen Network and three international cruise ships from Saga Cruise og Fred Olsen Line are scheduled to berth at Hundested in 2016.

== Landmarks ==
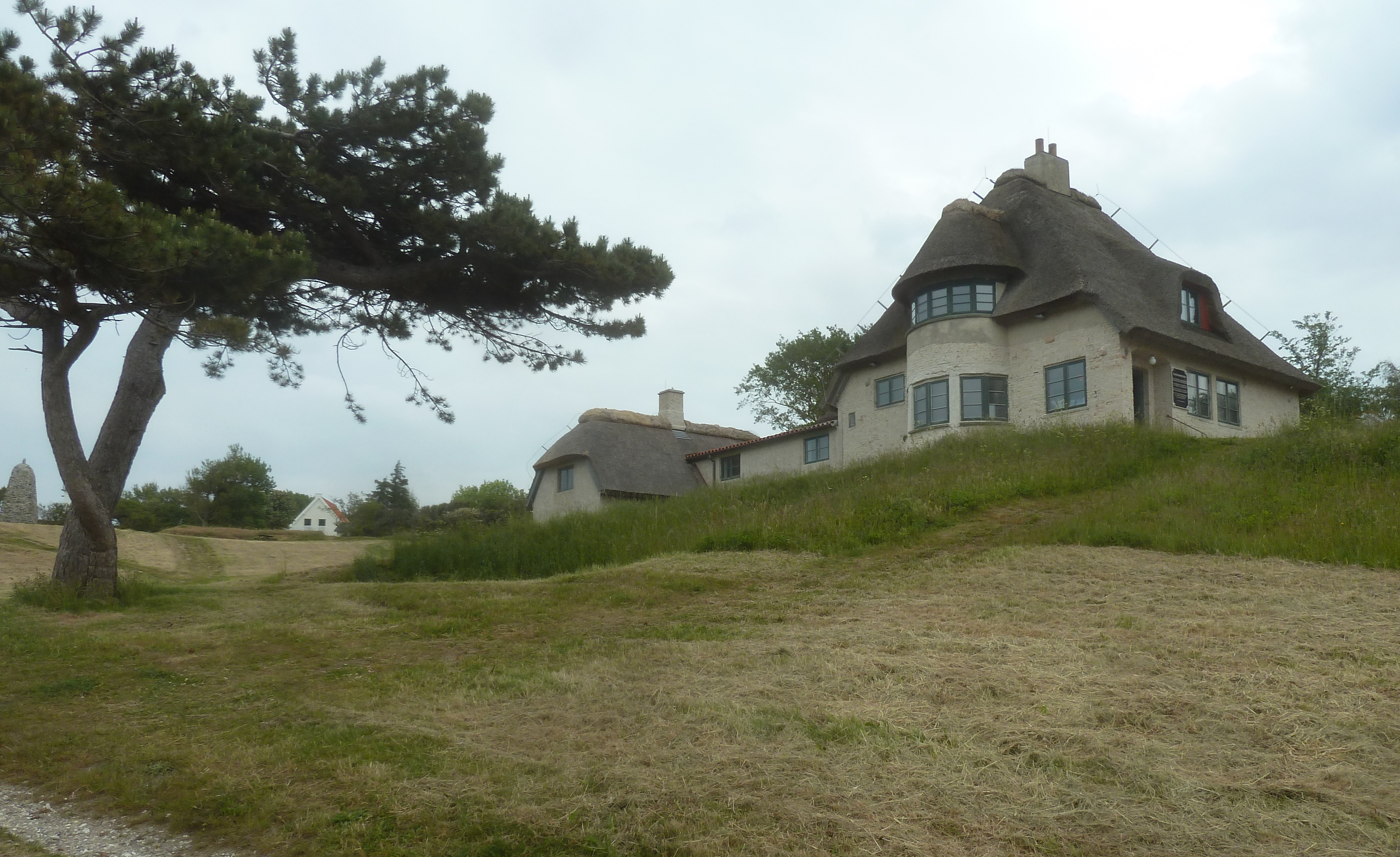
The Knud Rasmussen House

=== Knud Rasmussen House ===
The Knud Rasmussens House was built for the polar explorer Knud Rasmussen who lived there between his many expeditions to Greenland. The house is situated 30 metres (98 ft) above the beach, and offers a beautiful view of the Kattegat. It has been turned into a museum dedicated to the explorer and his work. It is full of photographs and paintings of Greenland.

=== Churches ===
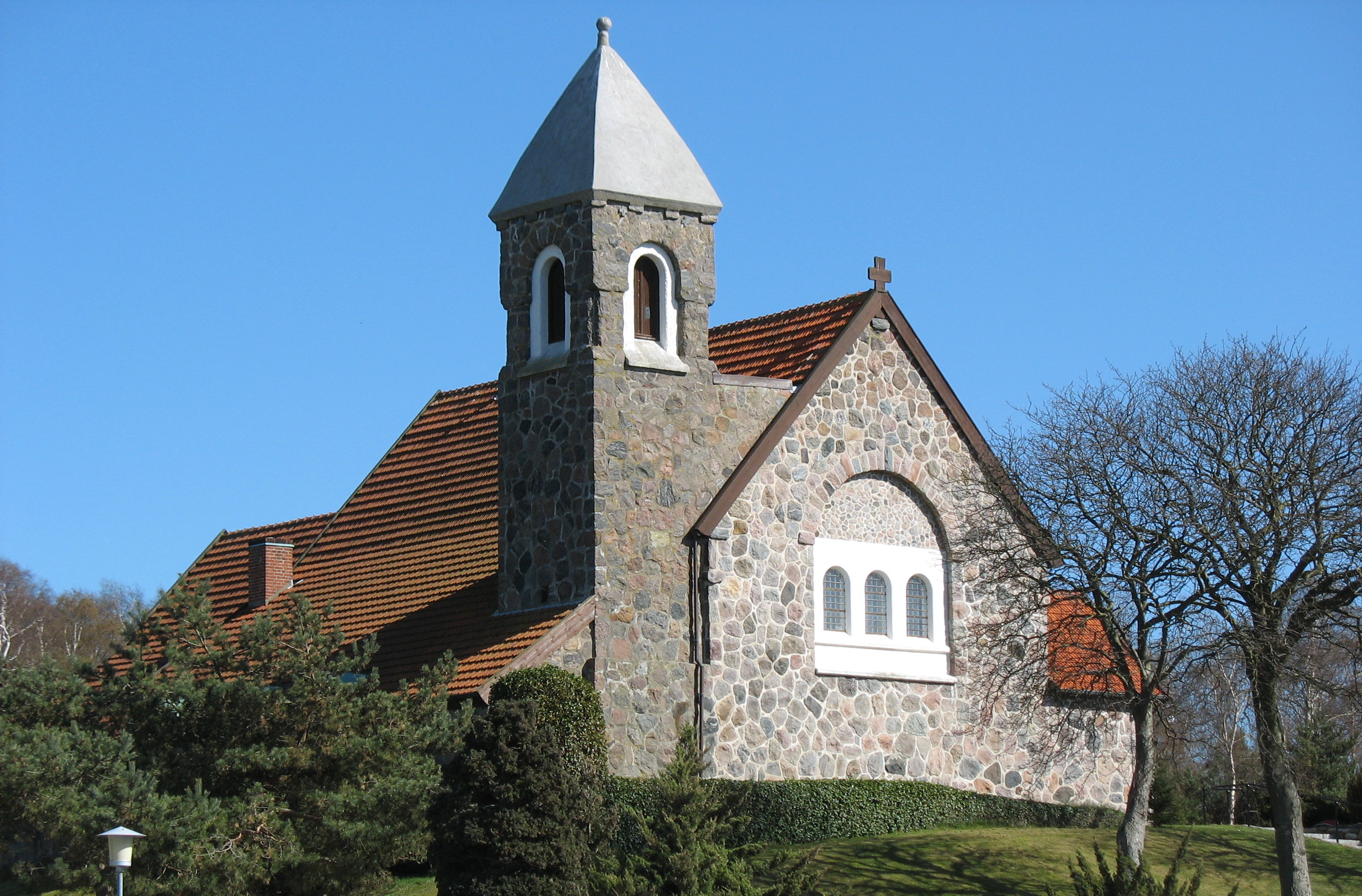
Lynæs Church

Hundested is located in the parish of Torup. Torup Church is located in the village of Torup approximately 7 km to the east of Hundested. It dates from the 12th century and features, among other things, a granite Romanesque baptismal font, frescoes from about 1250, a crucifix from about 1300 and the nave from 1750.

Lynæs Church was built in 1901 to design by Andreas Clemmesen.

== Sport ==
=== Rugby ===
- Hundested RK (1985)

== Surroundings ==
One of Denmark's largest dolmens, Grønnessedyssen Karlstenen, can be seen at nearby Grønnesse Forrest.

=== Harbour ===
The former municipality offers two harbours to pleasure boaters and sports fishers: Hundested Harbour, in the center of the town of Hundested, and Lynæs Harbour, located south of the town near the entryway into the Roskilde Fjord.

== Transport ==
=== Ferries ===
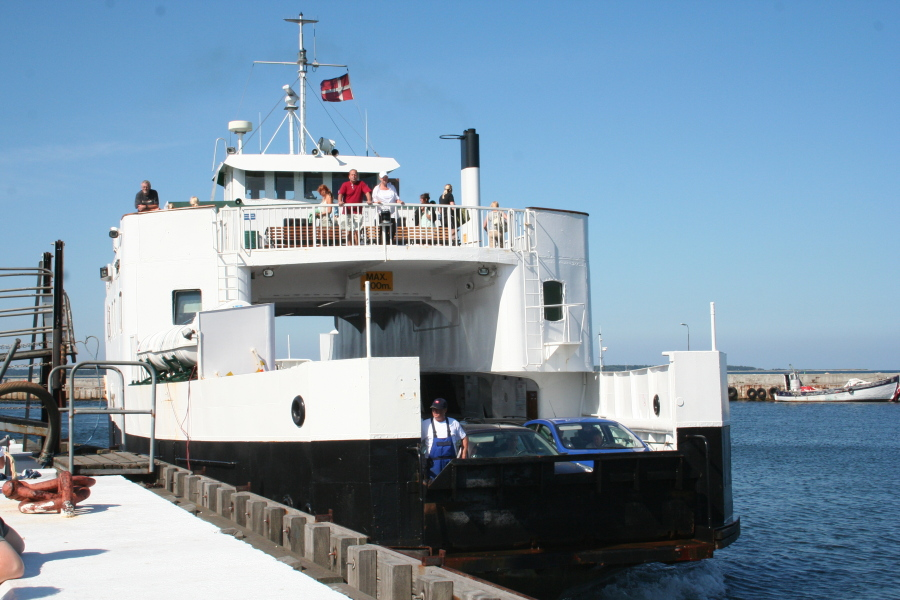
The Hundested-Rørvig ferry

One ferry connects Hundested to the town of Rørvig in Odsherred municipality, another to Kulhuse in Frederikssund municipality from the town of Sølager. For many years the town had a ferry connection to Grenå in Grenå municipality on the Jutland peninsula from the town of Hundested which began service 14 July 1934. This has, however, in recent years been discontinued. One of the former ferries on the route now operates as an expedition cruise ship under the name MS Expedition.

Ferry service in the area has a long history. When Lynæs Inn, south of the town of Hundested, was established in 1804, it was licensed as an inn catering to ferry passengers, although in those days the service was highly irregular.

=== Rail ===
The Frederiksværk Line connects Hundested with Frederiksværk, Hillerød and the Danish rail network. Hundested station is the principal railway station of the town. The town is also served by the railway halts Hundested Havn and Vibehus.

== Notable people ==
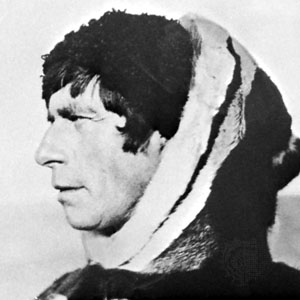
Knud Rasmussen

- Viggo Hørup (1841 in Torpmagle – 1902) a Danish politician, journalist and agitator; founded Politiken
- Knud Rasmussen (1879–1933) a Greenlandic/Danish polar explorer and anthropologist, the father of Eskimology; lived in Hundested between his many expeditions to Greenland
- Bertel Møhl (1936–2017 in Hundested) a Danish marine zoologist and physiologist
- Tomas Villum Jensen (born 1971) a Danish actor and film director
- Anders Blichfeldt, (Danish Wiki) (born 1963) member of the Danish pop/rock music group Big Fat Snake
- William Jøhnk Nielsen, (Danish Wiki) (born 1997) actor, played Frederick VI in the film A Royal Affair

=== Sport ===
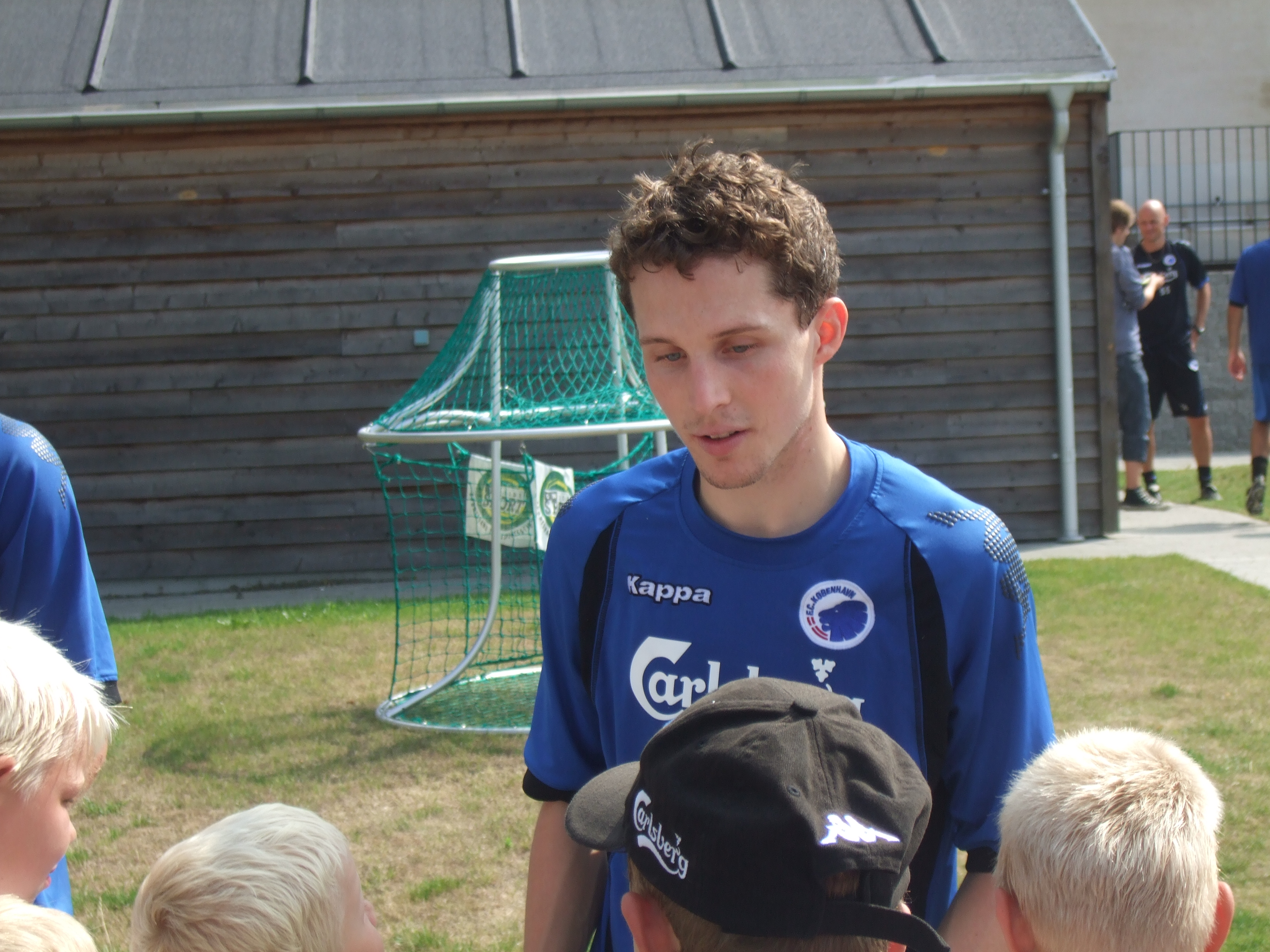
Morten Nordstrand, 2008

- Svend Olsen (1908 – 1980 in Hundested) a Danish weightlifter, silver medallist at the 1932 Summer Olympics
- Per Winge (1914 – 1989 in Hundested) a Danish sports shooter, competed at the 1952 Summer Olympics
- Morten Nordstrand (born 1983) a Danish professional footballer, with over 350 club caps and 8 for Denmark
- Mikkeline Kierkgaard (born 1984) a Danish former competitive figure skater.

== Gallery ==
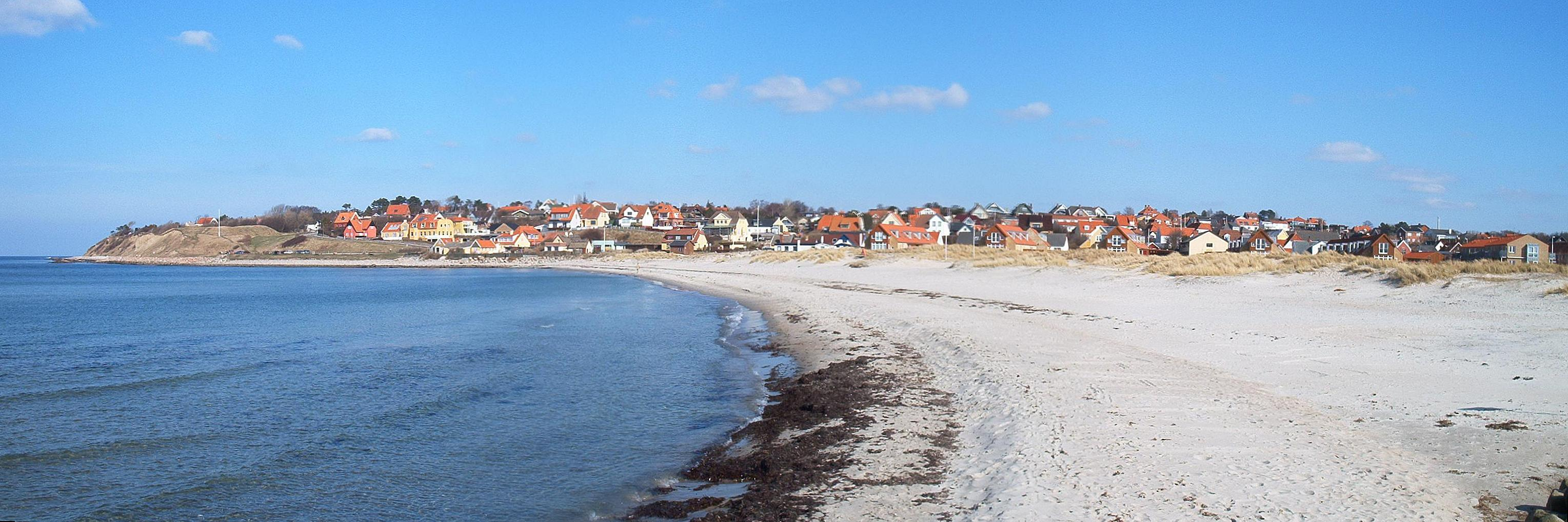
Hundested
