= Halsnæs Municipality =

Halsnæs Municipality Halsnæs Kommune (Danish)
- Municipality
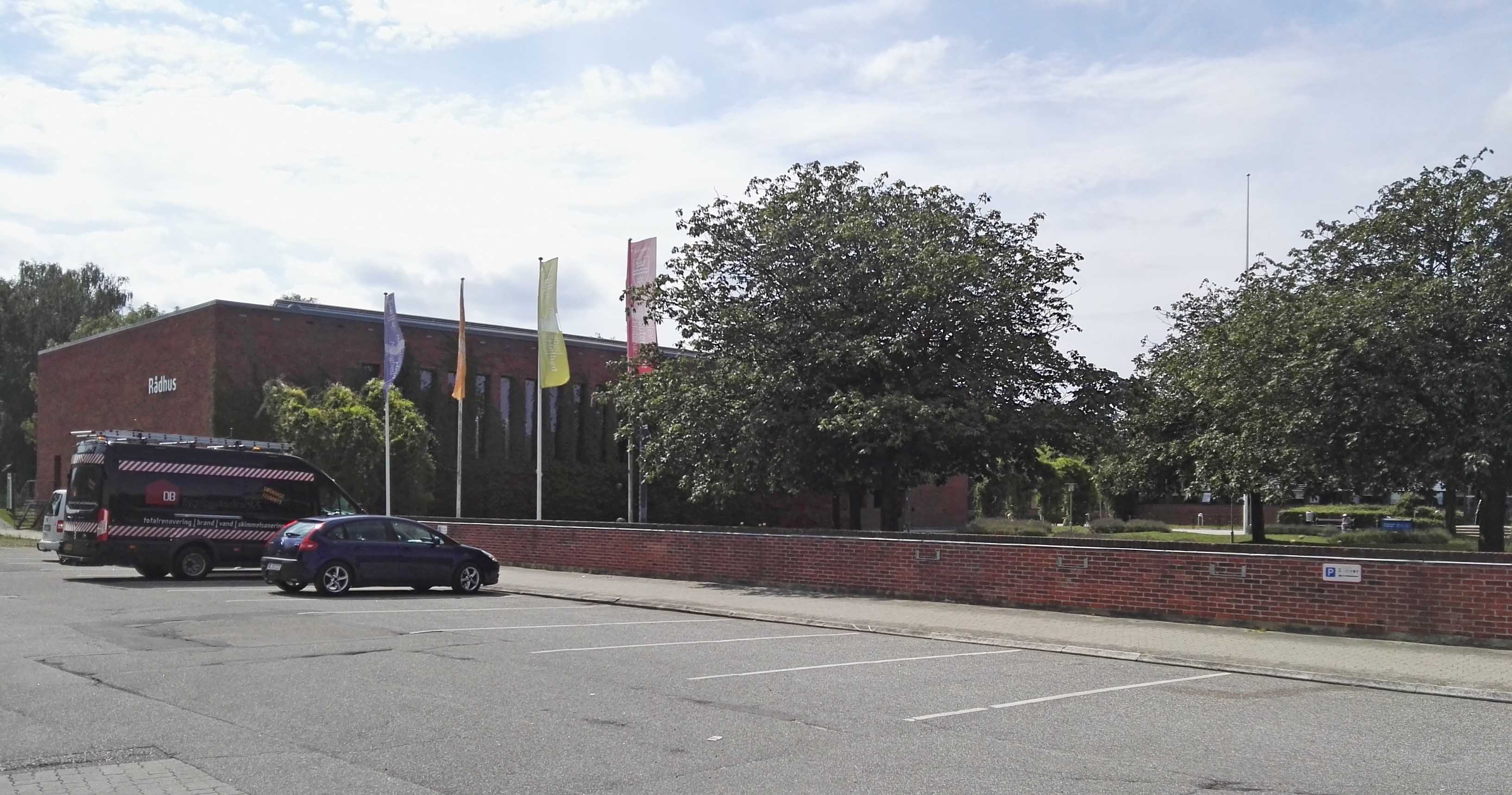
- City hall

- Coat of arms

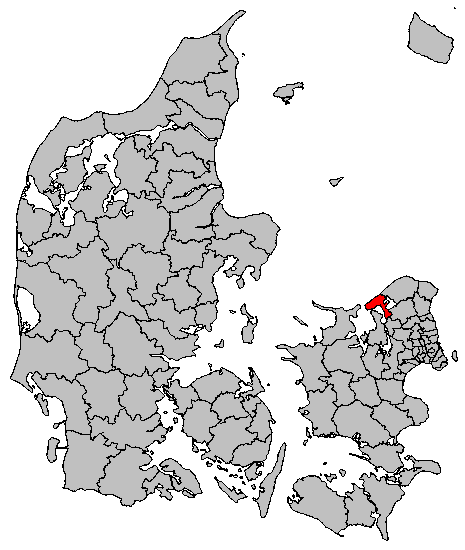
- Coordinates: 56°N 12°E
- Country: Denmark
- Region: Hovedstaden
- Established: 1 January 2007
- Seat: Frederiksværk

Government
  - Mayor: Steffen Jensen (S)

Area
  - Total: 122.15 km^{2} (47.16 sq mi)

Population (1 January 2026)
  - Total: 31,738
  - Density: 259.83/km^{2} (672.95/sq mi)
- Time zone: UTC+1 (CET)
  - Summer (DST): UTC+2 (CEST)
- Municipal code: 260
- Website: www.halsnaes.dk

Halsnæs Municipality (Danish: Halsnæs Kommune) is a municipality (Danish, kommune) in the Capital Region of Denmark. The municipality covers a total area (land and water) of 122.15 km^{2} (2013), according to Municipal Key Figures (De Kommunale Nøgletal (www.noegletal.dk)), and has a total population of 31,738 (1 January 2026). The municipality also includes the island Hesselø. Up to 20 km^{2} of the total area is water, as part of the largest lake in Denmark, Arresø, lies within the municipality. Its name comes from Halsnæs, the peninsula that forms the western part of the municipality.

The municipality was created on 1 January 2007 as a merger of the former municipalities of Frederiksværk and Hundested. At first the merged municipality wore the hyphenated name Frederiksværk-Hundested, but it was changed to Halsnæs on 1 January 2008. Its mayor, as of 1 January 2018, is Steffen Jensen, a member of the Social Democrats political party.

== Geography ==
Lake Arresø, the largest lake in Denmark, has its western part in the municipality. Originally a fjord connected to Kattegat, it was landlocked when the land northwest of the lake rose by 5 meters in the last ice age. In 1717, by royal order a canal was built (finished in 1719) to connect the lake with Roskilde fjord. The construction of the canal was necessary because the natural stream (Danish:å) from the lake to the fjord was filling up with sand. The water in the newly built canal was harnessed by a watermill, and the town of Frederiksværk basically was created through industrialization.

== Urban areas ==
The ten largest urban areas in the municipality are:

| # | Locality | Population |
|---|---|---|
| 1 | Frederiksværk | 12,257 |
| 2 | Hundested | 8,861 |
| 3 | Liseleje | 2.580 |
| 4 | Ølsted | 1,863 |
| 5 | Vinderød | 1,033 |
| 6 | Melby | 792 |
| 7 | Evetofte | 368 |
| 8 | Torup | 321 |
| 9 | Ølsted Sydstrand | 250 |
| 10 | Ølsted Strandhuse | 220 |

== Politics ==
=== Municipal council ===
Halsnæs' municipal council consists of 21 members, elected every four years.

Below are the municipal councils elected since the Municipal Reform of 2007.

| Election | Party | | | | | | | Total seats | Turnout | Elected mayor |
|---|---|---|---|---|---|---|---|---|---|---|
| Election | A | B | C | F | O | V | Ø | Total seats | Turnout | Elected mayor |
| 2005 | 13 | 1 | 2 | 1 | 3 | 4 | 1 | 25 | 66.5% | Helge Friis (A) |
| 2009 | 8 | | 1 | 3 | 3 | 6 | | 21 | 64.5% | Helge Friis (A) |
| 2013 | 8 | | | 1 | 4 | 7 | 1 | 21 | 73.1% | Steen Hasselriis (V) |
| 2017 | 10 | | | 2 | 2 | 6 | 1 | 21 | 71.1% | Steffen Jensen (A) |
Data from Kmdvalg.dk 2005, 2009, 2013 and 2017

== Landmarks ==
- Arresødal Castle, completed in 1788, now serves as a private hospital.
