= Fiolstræde 29 =

Listed building in Copenhagen

Fiolstræde 20
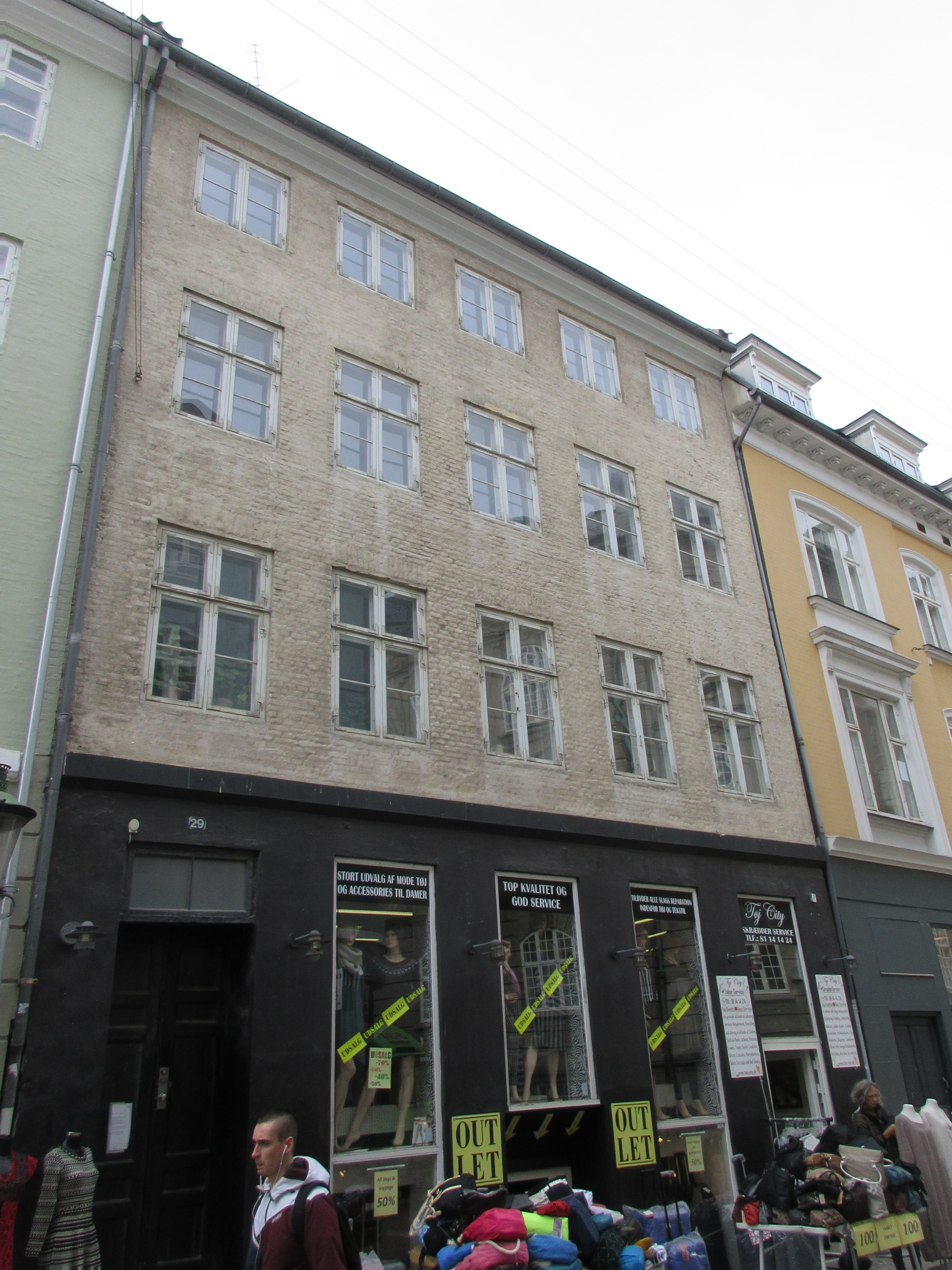
- Interactive map of the Fiolstræde 20 area

General information
- Location: Copenhagen, Denmark
- Coordinates: 55°40′55.92″N 12°34′18.7″E
- Completed: 1810
- Client: Danish Union of Teachers

Fiolstræde 29 is a Neoclassical building situated on the shopping street Fiolstræde, roughly opposite Rosengården, in the Old Town of Copenhagen, Denmark. It was constructed by master carpenter Johan Christoffer Wahl as part of the rebuilding of the city following the British bombardment of Copenhagen in 1807. The building was listed on the Danish registry of protected buildings and places in 1951.

== History ==
=== Site history, 1579–1807 ===
The property was originally part of a long, narrow property which continued all the way from Nørregade in the west to Fiolstræde in the east, comprising present-day Nørregade 38 and Fiolstræde 29. In 1579 a small portion of land towards Fiolstræde was turned into a separate property. Its first owner was Mogens Lauridsen from Herlev. In a document dated 15 February 1610, Knud Rasmussen from Lyderslev is mentioned as the owner of the property in Fiolstræde. By 1623, it belonged to his sons-in-law Mogens Hansen and Niels Rasmussen. On 7 March 1624 the property was acquired by weaver Mads Olsen. The two next owners—Mads Lauritzen and Hans Andersen—were also weavers. On 19 October 1685 the property was acquired by distiller Bent Andersen. In Copenhagen's first cadastre from 1689 his property was listed as No. 203 in Kldebo Quarter. The next owner was distiller Rasmus Nielsen. On 3 November 1727, No. 203 was acquired by Jørgen Matthiesen. He owned the property until 25 June 1731.

The property was listed in the new cadastre of 1756 as No. 201 in Klædebo Quarter, owned by Søren Sørensen.

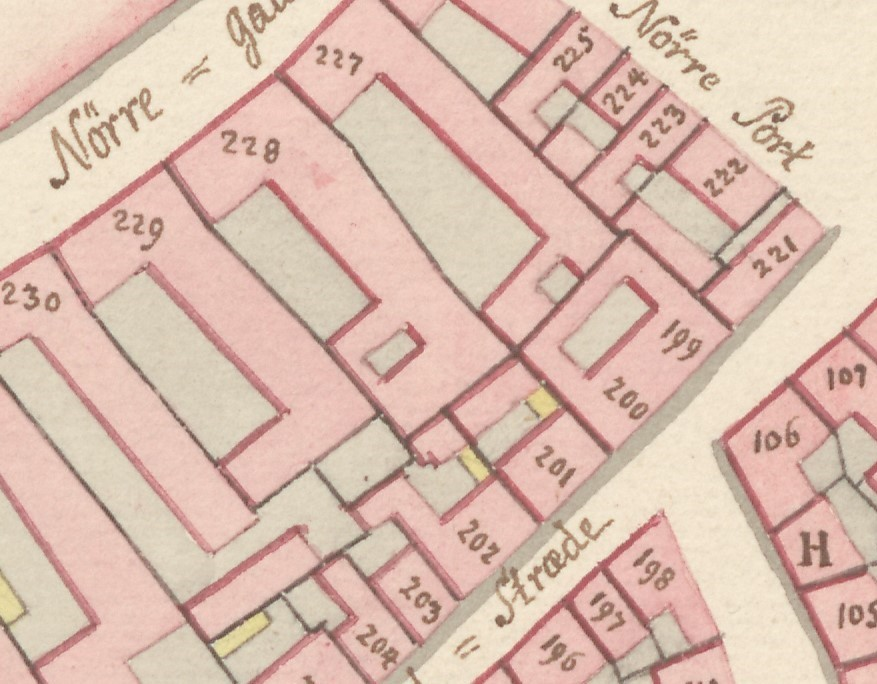
No. 201 seen on a detail from Christian Gedde's map of Klædebo Quarter, 1757

The property was probably later acquired by Niels de Hemmer (1745–1784). It was at least later owned by his widow Sidse Marie de Hemmer (née Rohr, 1755–1809). Her property was home to 21 residents in eight households at the 1787 census. The owner, who was recorded as a flour merchant, resided in the building with her two daughters (aged four and seven). Jens Horob, a businessman (commosaor), resided in the building with his wife Johanne Jørgens and their two sons (aged eight and 10). Jørgen Rasmussen, a workman, resided in the building with his wife Magrethe. Helene Brandstrup, an unmarried 73-year-old woman with a pension, resided in the building on her own. Christian Krag, a workman, resided in the building with his wife Maren Jørgens. Christen Andersen, a workman, resided in the building with his wife Sidse Olsdatter and their three children (aged one to four). Christian Fischer, a workman, resided in the building with his wife Ingerborre. Hans Sørensen, another workman, resided in the building with his wife Anne Peters.

The property was home to 35 residents in ten households at the 1801 census. Lars Bentzen, a tea retailer, resided in the building with his wife Marie Elisabeth Nyemann. Hans Olsen, a master tanner, resided in the building with his wife Margrethe Christine Rutil, their two-year-old son and a tanner (employee). Friderich Gøtz, a tambour, resided in the building with his wife Johanne Christine Lange. one maid and two lodgers. Peder Falberg, a taukir, resided in the building with his wife Helene Gabrielsdatter and their two children (aged seven and nine). Johan Friderich Hansen, a smith at Holmen, resided in the building with his wife Caroline Mathilde Lønholdt and their one-year-old son. Ane Marie Jensen, a widow, resided in the building with the widows Dorthea Margrethe Kildrop and Ane Jensen Klit and the latter's 13-year-old son. Rasmus Møller, a concierge, resided in the building with his wife Ingeborg Wastrup and their four children (aged three to eight). Christopher Hendrich Zonse, a fired soldier, resided in the building with his wife Ane Marie Madsdatter and their 12-year-old son. Birthe Olsen, a widow, resided in the building with the widow Margrethe Juler and the latter's 23-year-old son Niels Juler (book printer).

The property was listed in the new cadastre of 1806 as No. 221 in Klædebo Quarter. It was at that time still owned by Sidse Marie Hemmer.

=== Wahl and the new building ===
The property was destroyed during the British bombardment of the city in 1807, together with most of the other buildings in Fiolstræde. The present building on the site was constructed for distiller Christen Christensen by master carpenter Johan Christoffer Wahl in 1810.

=== 1845 census ===
Christian Ditlev Schmidt, a first lieutenant and royal customs official, resided on the ground floor with his wife Elina Marie Holm and their four children (aged four to 18). Carl Christian Andersen, a workman, resided on the same floor with his wife Marie Andersen, their two-year-old son and his mother Inger Hermandsen. Johan Hansen Walbom, a master shoemaker, resided on the first floor with his wife Elisabeth Walbom, their four children (aged one to eight), two shoemakers, two shoemaker's apprentices and one maid. Anne Marie Schwenck, a widow, resided on the second floor with her three children (aged 12 to 24). Adolph Ferdinant Jacobsen, a master shoemaker, resided in the basement with his wife Susanne Jacobsen, their two children (aged nine and 12) and three lodgers. Peter Lorentz Schmidt, a joiner, resided on the third floor with his wife Juliane Marie Nielsen, their five-year-old daughter and two lodgers (student and seamstress).

The rear wing was home to another 26 residents.

=== 1860 census ===
No. 221 was listed as Fiolstræde 29 when house numbering by street was introduced as an alternative to the old cadastre numbers by quarter in 1859. The front wing was home to 22 residents at the 1860 census. Hendrik Blichfeldt, a royal lackey, resided on the ground floor with his wife Marie Blichfeldt and a 20-year-old unmarried daughter. Jensine Caroline Scheel, an unmarried woman in her 40s, resided on the first floor with one lodger. Heinrich Christian Halkjær, a servant resided om the second floor with his wife Ane Cathrine Halkjær, their 11-year-old foster daughter and one lodger. Lorenz Peter Schmidt, a master joiner, resided on the third floor with his wife Juliane Marie Schmidt, their 20-year-old unmarried daughter and two lodgers (theology student and law student). Loise Marie Lorentzen, a shoemaker's widow, resided in the basement with her six children (aged five to 23) and one lodger. The lodger and the second-eldest son were shoemakers. The eldest son was a bookbinder. The rear wing was home to another 19 residents. Eduard Kjær, a roofer (blytækkersvend), resided on the first floor with his wife Caroline Cathrine and their three-year-old daughter. Mads Christensen, a workman, resided on the same floor with his wife Karen Petersen and their one-year-old foster son. Maren Andersen, a widow, resided on the second floor with two children (aged 19 and 33) and one lodger. Frederik Wilhelm Schverche, a carpenter, resided on the same floor. Jens Jensen, a workman, resided on the third floor with his wife Karen Jensen, their two children (aged four to seven) and one lodger (workman). Ane Marie Povelsen, an unmarried woman employed with needlework, resided on the same floor with her two foster children (aged four and six).

=== Later history ===
In 1997, Fiolstræde 29 was owned for DKK 4.6 mio. by Jes Olesen. In 2019, he sold the property.

== Architecture ==
Fiolstræde 29 is a five bays wide building constructed in brick with four storeys over a walk-out basement. The facade is finished by a white-painted cornice. The ground floor is plastered and black-painted. The main entrance is located in the bay furthest to the south (left). The basement entrance is located in the central bay. The shop on the ground floor was originally accessed via the building's main entrance but is now entered through a separate entrance in the bay furthest to the north /right). The pitched roof is clad in red tile. The roof ridge is pierced by a chimney.

== Today ==
The property contains retail on the ground floor and in the basement and a single residential apartment on each of the upper floors.
