= Fiolstræde 18 =

Listed buildings in Copenhagen

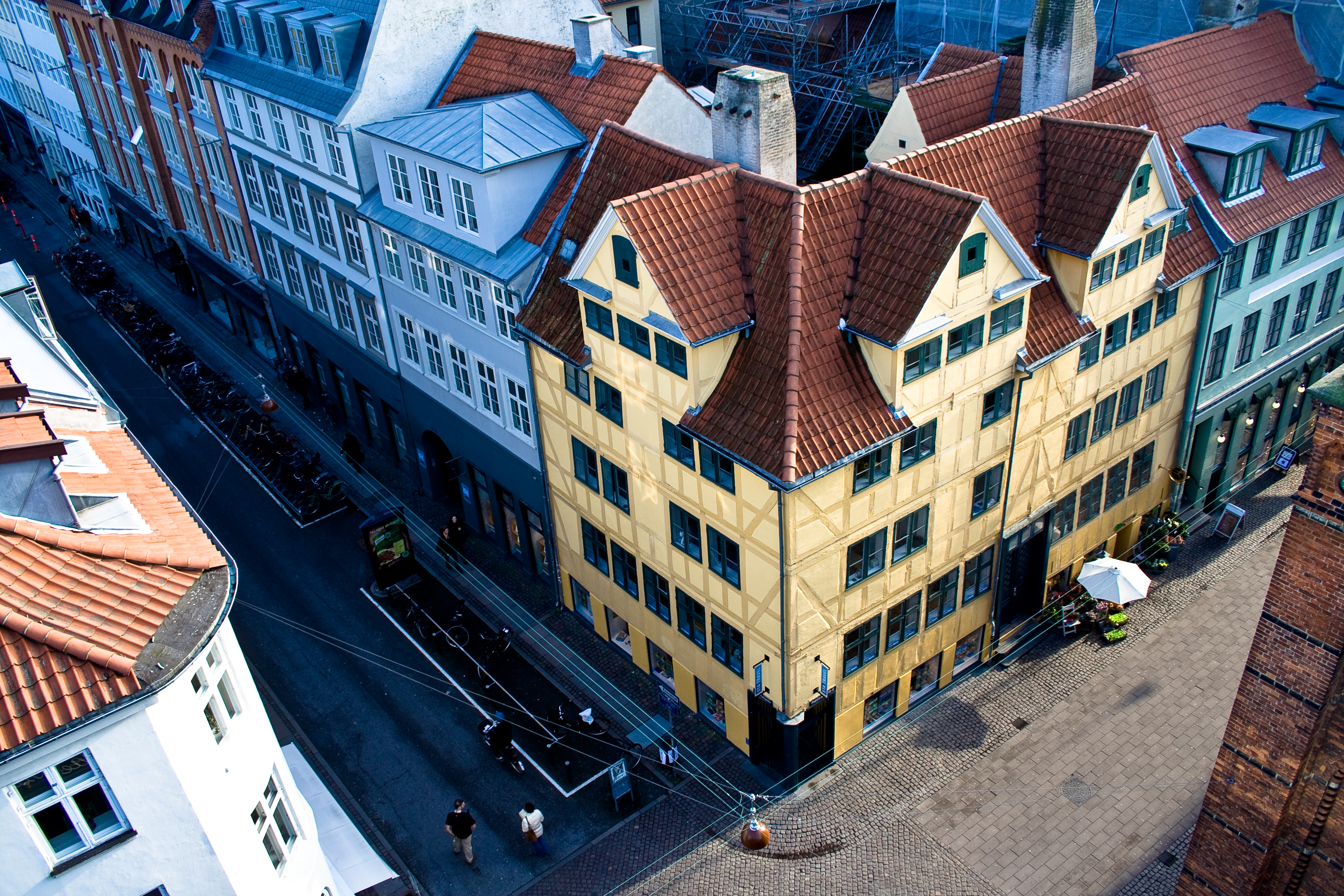
- Interactive map of the Fiolstræde 18 area

General information
- Location: Copenhagen, Denmark
- Coordinates: 55°40′50.48″N 12°34′23.16″E
- Completed: 1730s

Fiolstræde 18 is a half-timbered building situated at the corner of Fiolstræde and Krystalgade in the Old Town of Copenhagen, Denmark. It was constructed in 1734 as part of the rebuilding of the city following the Copenhagen Fire of 1728. It was listed in the Danish registry of protected buildings and places in 1939.

== History ==
=== 16th century ===
On 22 May 1635, Tobias Lichtenau is mentioned as the owner of the property. Before 1645, it was acquired by Claus Føye, snedker. It was after his death owned by his wife Anne. On 3 April 1793, it was acquired by Margrethe Eilersen, widow of Diderik Fuiren til Fuirendal. Her property was listed in Copenhagen's first cadastre of 1689 as No. 193 in Klædebo Quarter. On 3 May 1696, No. 183 was acquired by Hans Laursen. On 1 June 1698, he sold the property to Claus Oldenborg,

=== 18th century ===
On 6 February 1713, Laursen sold the property to Jens Henriksen Storm. His building was destroyed in the Copenhagen Fire of 1728. Jens Henriksen Storm kept the property until 26 June 1734. The present building on the site was constructed in the 1734, probably by master carpenter Peder Sørensen.

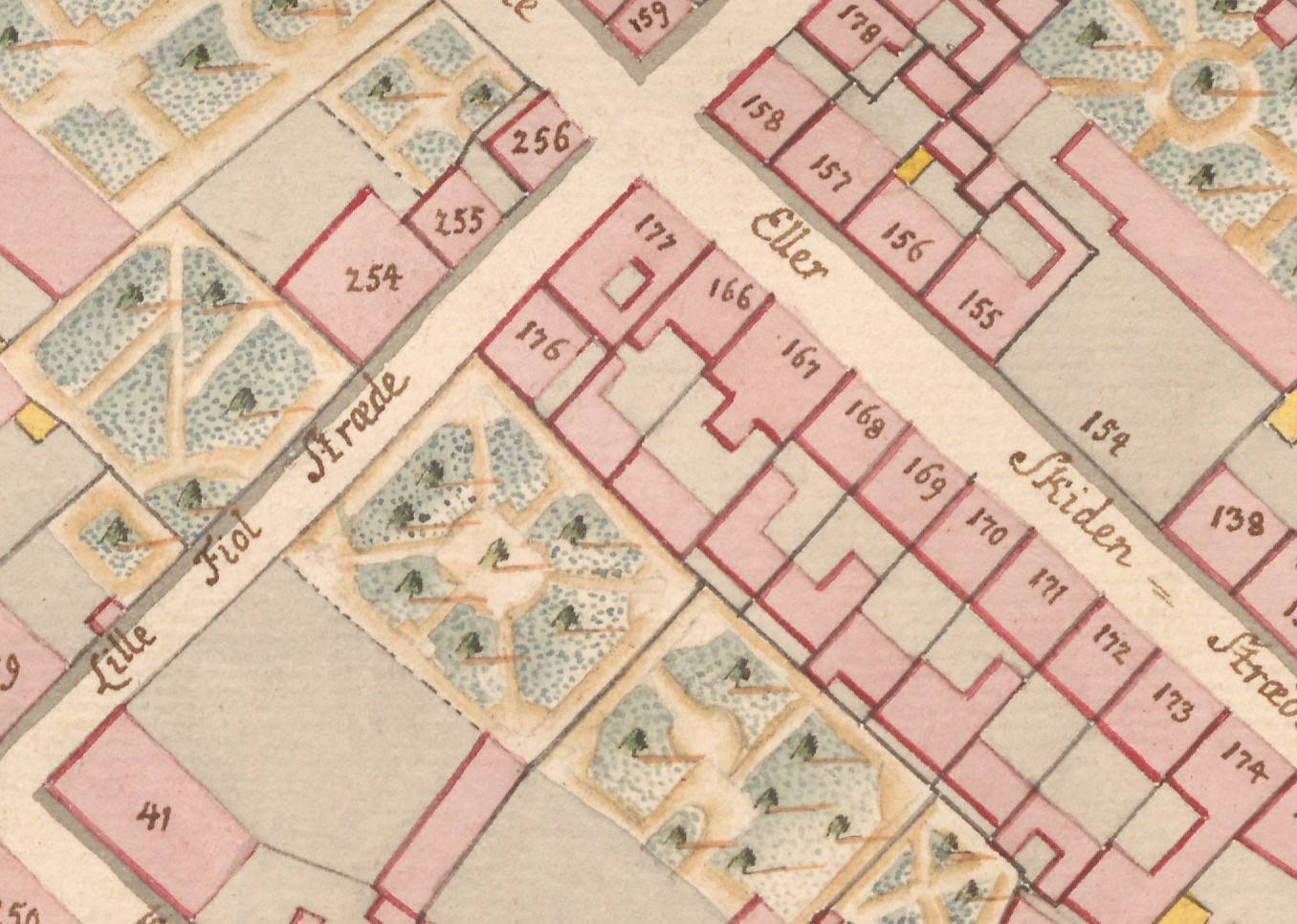
No. 177 seen on a detail from Christian Gedde's map of Klædebo Quarter, 1757.

The property was listed in the new cadastre of 1756 as No. 177 in Klædebo Quarter, owned by grocer (høker) Jens Jensen.

The property was home to 27 residents in seven households at the 1898 census. Ole Birch, a grocer (høker), resided in the building with his wife Mette Gunner, their two daughters (aged one and seven) and one maid. Niels Bencke, a smith, resided in the building with his wife Kirstine Bentzen and their two children (aged one and two). Jens Hassing, a candlemaker, resided in the building with his wife Maren Maksen. Thoroe Myres, a widow, resided in the building with her 5-year-old daughter and one maid. Christian Grono, a book binder, resided in the building with his wife Anna Maria and one maid. Georg Enghard, a workman, resided in the building with his wife Elisabeth Maria and their four children (aged one to 10). Peter Møller, another workman, resided in the building with his wife Anne Lisbeth and their two children (aged nine and 11).

=== 19th century ===
The property was at some point acquired by the candlemaker Jens Christensen Hassing (cf. the 1787 census). His property was home to 34 residents in nine households at the 1801 census. Jens Christensen Hassing resided in the building with his wife Maren Marcussen, a soldier in the Prince's Regiment who also acted as caretaker and one maid. Johannes Jensen Reiniche, a grocer (spækhøker), resided in the building with his wife Christiane Christensen and their two children (aged one and six). Lars Krag, a beer seller (øltapper), resided in the building with his wife Dorothea Maria Schmidt, their three children (aged four to 10), two lodgers and one maid. Niels Larsen, a mailman, resided in the building with his wife Anne Cathrine Lassen and their eight-year-old son. Friderich Kaas, a city drum major (stadstambour), resided in the building with his wife Cathrine Elisabeth Petersen. Andreas Lund, a master tailor, resided in the building with his wife Sophie Magdalene Petersen and the 21-year-old lodger Otto Sommer Monrad (law student). Peter Agersen, a worker at a sugar refinery (sukkerhussvend), resided in the building with his wife Anne Margrethe Thorsen, their two children (aged one and four), a 31-year-old laundry lady, and her three-year-old daughter. Rasmus Andersen, a workman, resided in the building with his wife Ellen Cathrine Andersen. Andreas Lundberg, a tailor, resided in the building with his wife Margrethe Hansen.

The property was listed in the new cadastre of 1806 as No. 195 in Klædebo Quarter. It was still owned by Jens Christian Hassing at that time.

=== 1845 census ===
The property was home to 57 residents at the 1845 census. Vilhelm Vestermann, a master bookbinder, resided on the ground floor with his wife Josephine Marie Vestermann, their three children (aged one to eight) and one maid. Johanne Kruse, a widow, resided on the ground floor with her daughter Nancy Christiane Kruse and the lodger Johan Henningsen (language teacher). Christian Brun, a master painter, resided on the first floor with his wife Frederikke Brun, two painter's apprentices and one lodger. Anton Kahn, a Jewish man (profession unknown), resided on the first floor with his wife Cecilie Kahn, their two children (aged five and eight) and one maid. Andreas Græs, a building painter, resided on the second floor with his wife Caroline Græs, their five children (aged five to 18) and three lodgers (painter, tanner and tailor). Marie Larsen, a widow, resided in the other second-floor apartment with her 21-year-old daughter Pauline Larsen and three lodgers. Anders Ludvig Stangerup, a chairmaker, resided in the garret with his wife Else Margrethe Stangerup, their three children (aged two to eight) and one lodger. Johan Henrich Christoff Uhde, a master tailor, resided in the garret with his wife Anne Lusie Uhde and their 13-year-old son. Cirstine Berg, a widow employed with needlework, resided in the garret with her three children (aged 13 to 23). Niels Jensen, a grocer (høker), resided in the basement with his wife Anne Cathrine Jensen and their four children (aged four to 12).

=== 1860 census ===
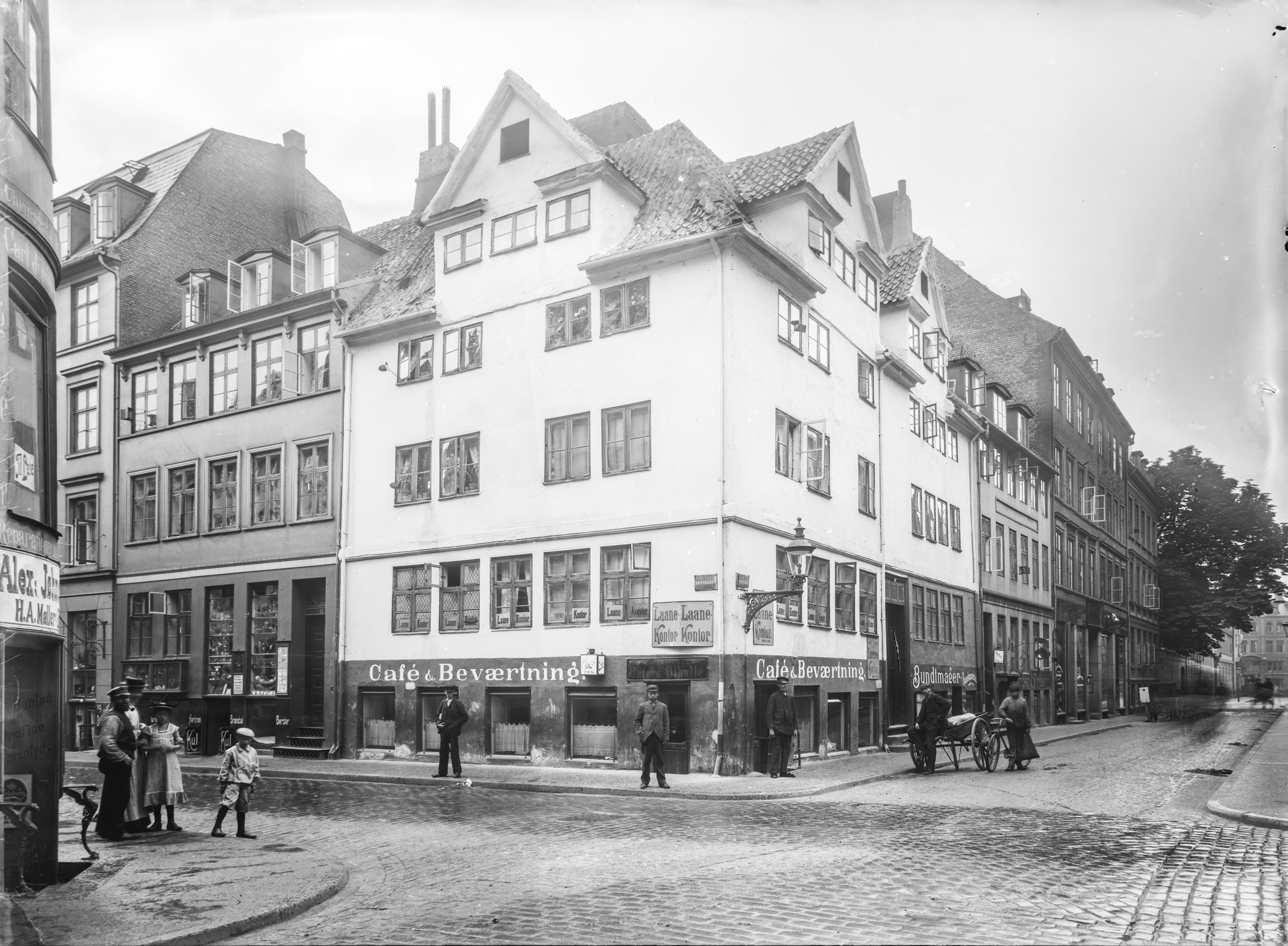
The building photographed by Johannes Hauerslev.

The building was home to 40 residents at the 1860 census. Julius Lund, a master tailor, resided in the building with his wife Albertine Sophie Lund, their four-year-old son and one lodger. Diderich Jacob Forbæch, a pharmacist, resided in the building with his wife Alise Sophie Forbæch and their 25-year-old son. Carl F. Nielsen, a ship builder, resided in the building with his wife Aanna Nielsen and two lodgers. Poul Christensen, a joiner, resided in the building with his wife Chatrine Christensen, their two foster children (aged 10 and 15). Johan Peter Mathisen, a brick-layer, resided in the building with his wife Severine Christiane Mathisen and their three children (aged one to seven). Peter Jensen, a man in his 30s (profession unknown), resided in the building with his wife Caroline Jensen and their three-year-old son. Peder Christian Schmidt, a workman, resided in the building with his wife Ane Elisabeth Schmidt, their 10-year-old daughter and two lodgers. Christen Rasmussen, a workman, resided in the basement with his wife Else Rasmussen, their 11-year-old son and one lodger. Ole Hansen, another workman, resided in the building with his wife Magrete Hansen and their two children (aged four and seven).

== Architecture ==
Fiolstræde 18 is a timber-framed, four-winged complex, constructed with three storeys over a walk-out basement, except for the east wing which is only two storeys tall. The facades towards the two streets are finished with yellow plastering, with green-painted window frames and doors. They are crowned by three three-bay, gabled wall dormers, two towards Fiolstræde and one towards Krystalgade. The corner of the building is chamfered at street level (ground floor and exposed part of the basement). The upper floors are supported by a wooden pillar at the corner. The green-painted main entrance is located in tFiolstræde. Another entrance door in Krystalgade has been removed. The roof is clad in red tiles.

== Today ==
The ground floor and basement of the building is divided into two two-storey shops. The three upper floors are divided into five residential apartments, two on the first and second floors and one in the garret.
