= Peder Hvitfeldts Stræde =

Street in Copenhagen, Denmark

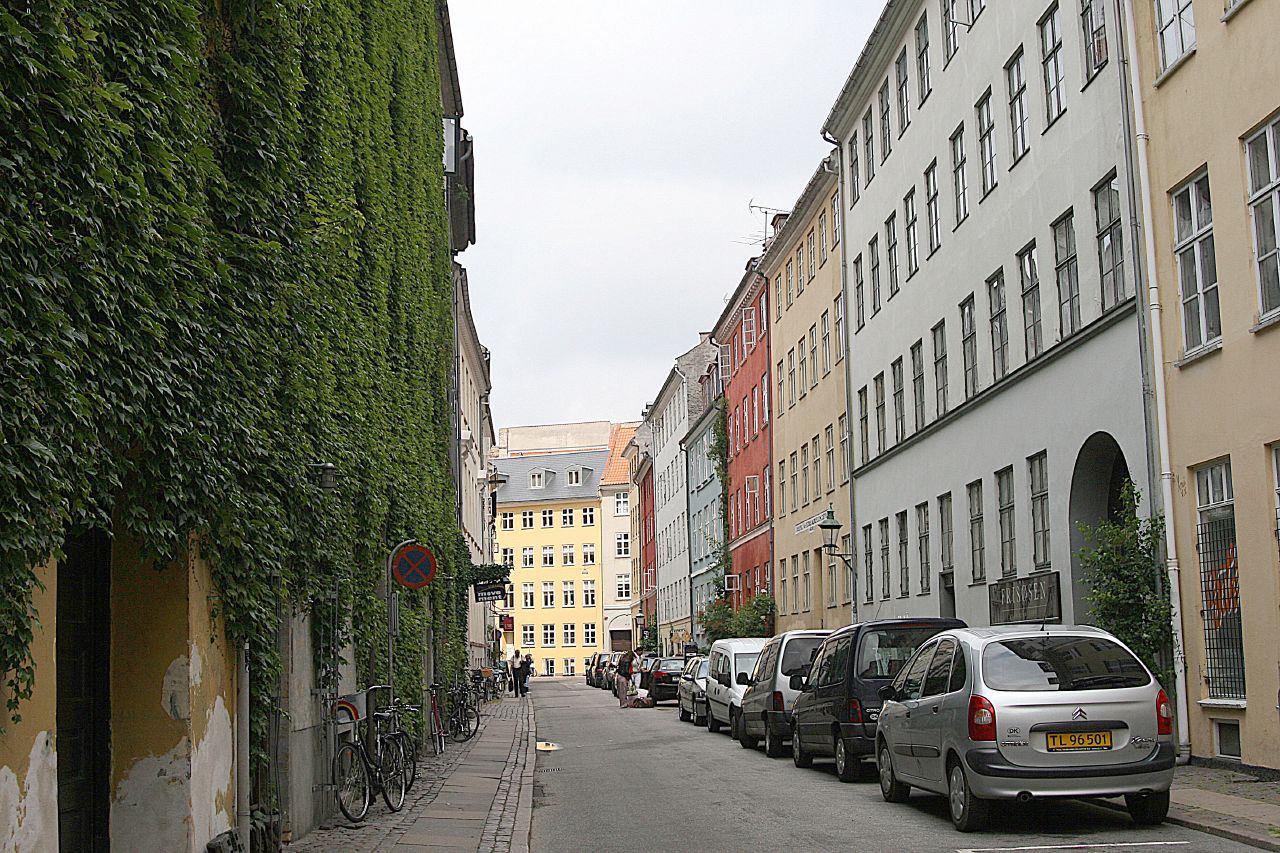
- Peder Hvitfeldts Stræde
- Length: 128 m (420 ft)
- Location: Indre By, Copenhagen, Denmark
- Postal code: 1173
- Nearest metro station: Nørreport
- Coordinates: 55°40′54.46″N 12°34′26.95″E

Peder Hvitfeldts Stræde is a street in the Old Town of Copenhagen, Denmark. It runs from Rosengården in the north to Krystalgade in the south.

== History ==
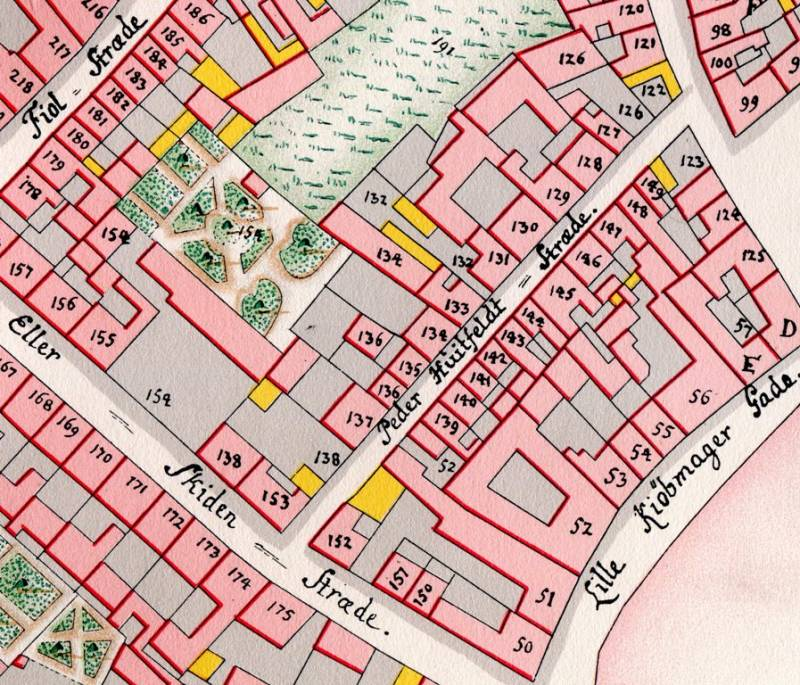
Peder Hvitfeldts Stræde seen on Gedde's district map

The street is first mentioned in 1581 as Peder Huidfeldzstrede and is later referred to as Huitfeldtstræde. It takes its name after the nobleman Peter Hvidtfeldt (died 1584) who owned a property at the site. He served as Chancellor of Norway from 1547 to 1565.

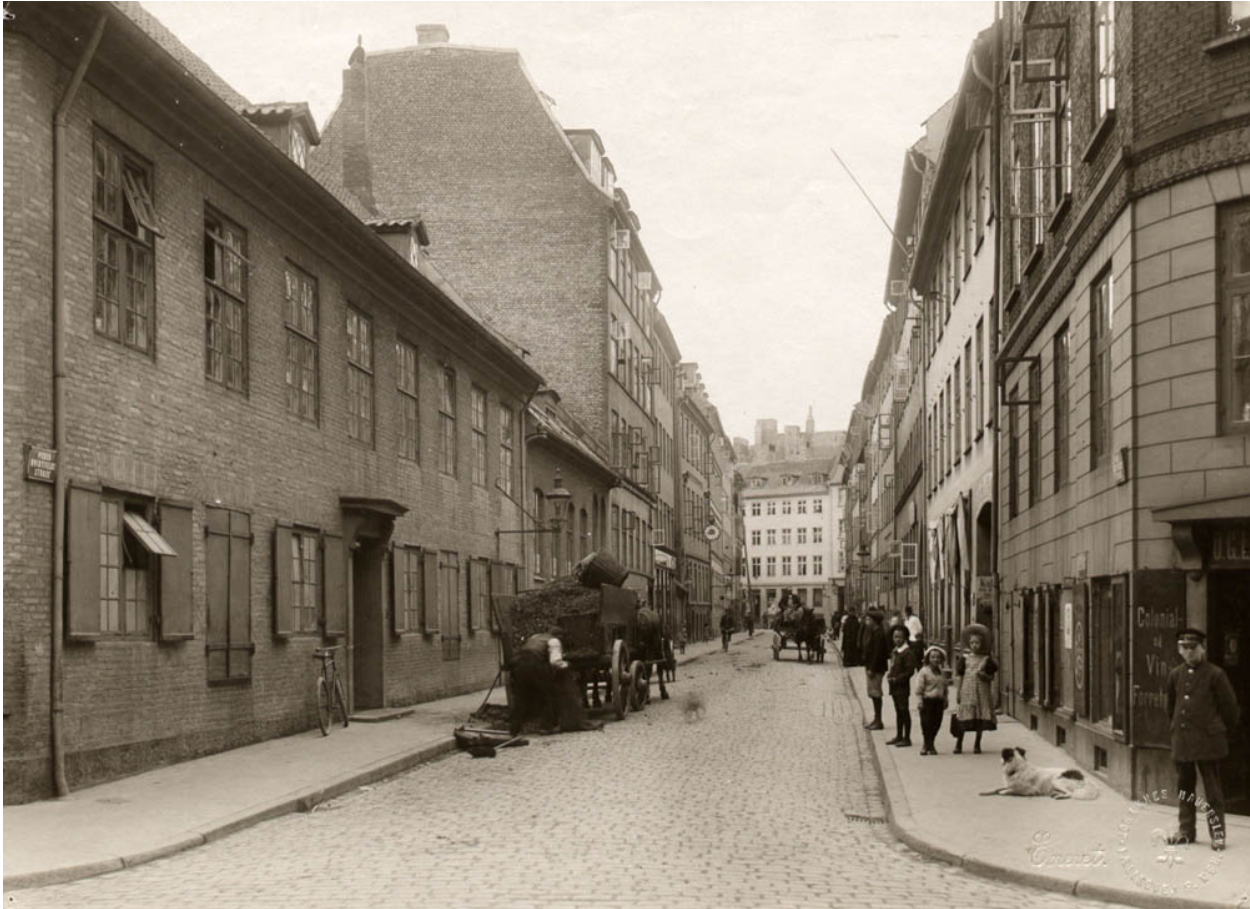
Peder Hvitfeldts Stræde

The Guild Hall of the Timbers' Guild was in the 18th century situated on the west side of the street. To its rear was an off-site section of Church of Our Lady's graveyard. It could be reached from Peder Hvitfeldts Stræde by way of a narrow passageway known as Willum Fuirens Gang.

The street was completely destroyed in the Copenhagen Fire of 1795.

== Notable buildings and residents ==
The yellow, two-storey building at the corner with Krystalgade is a former school associated with nearby Church of Our Lady. It was built in 1820-21 and is now listed on the Danish registry of protected buildings and places. The two narrow buildings at No. 10 (1811) and No. 12 (1809–1818) and the larger, eight-storey property at No. 13 are also listed.

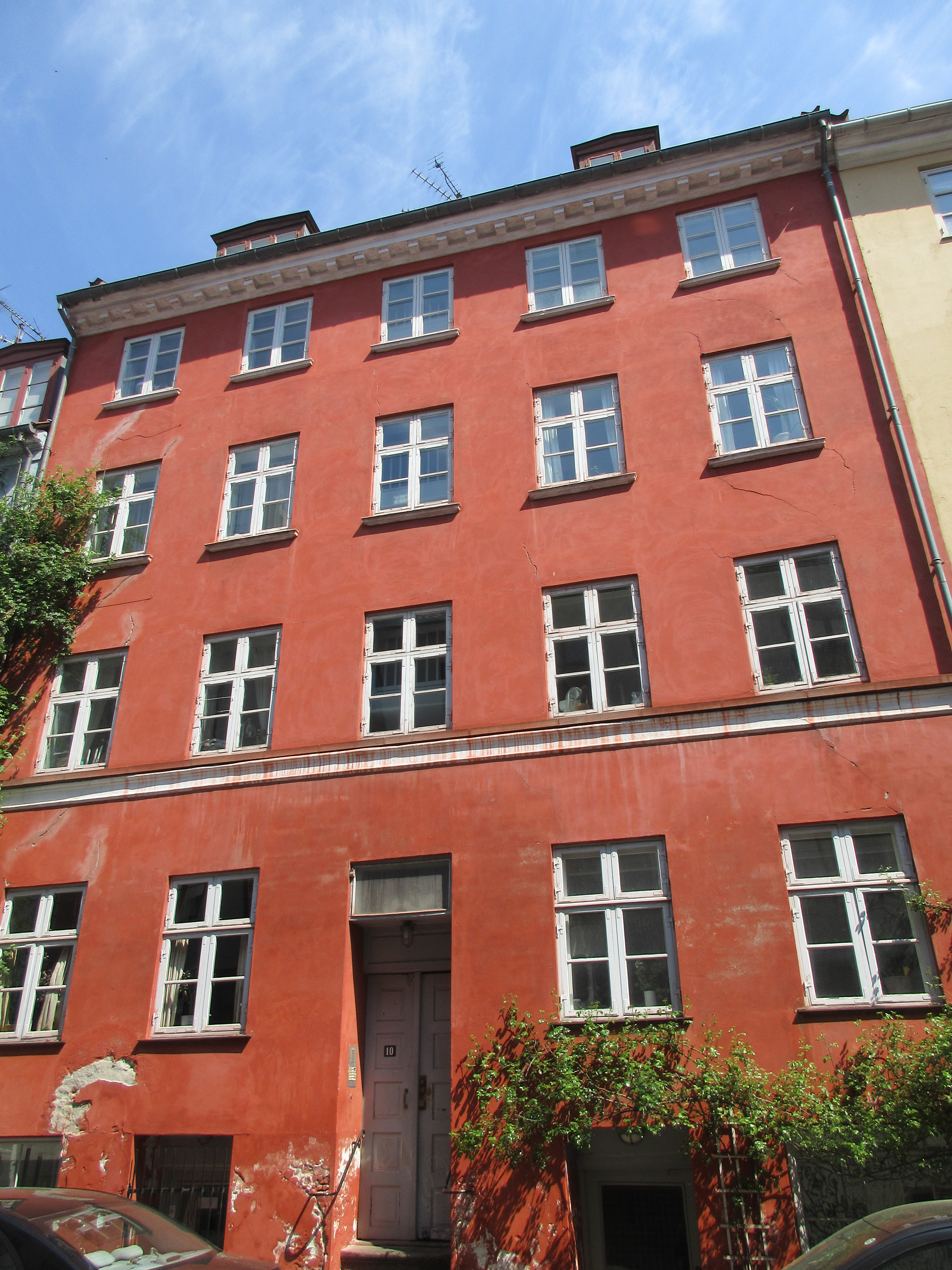
No. 10

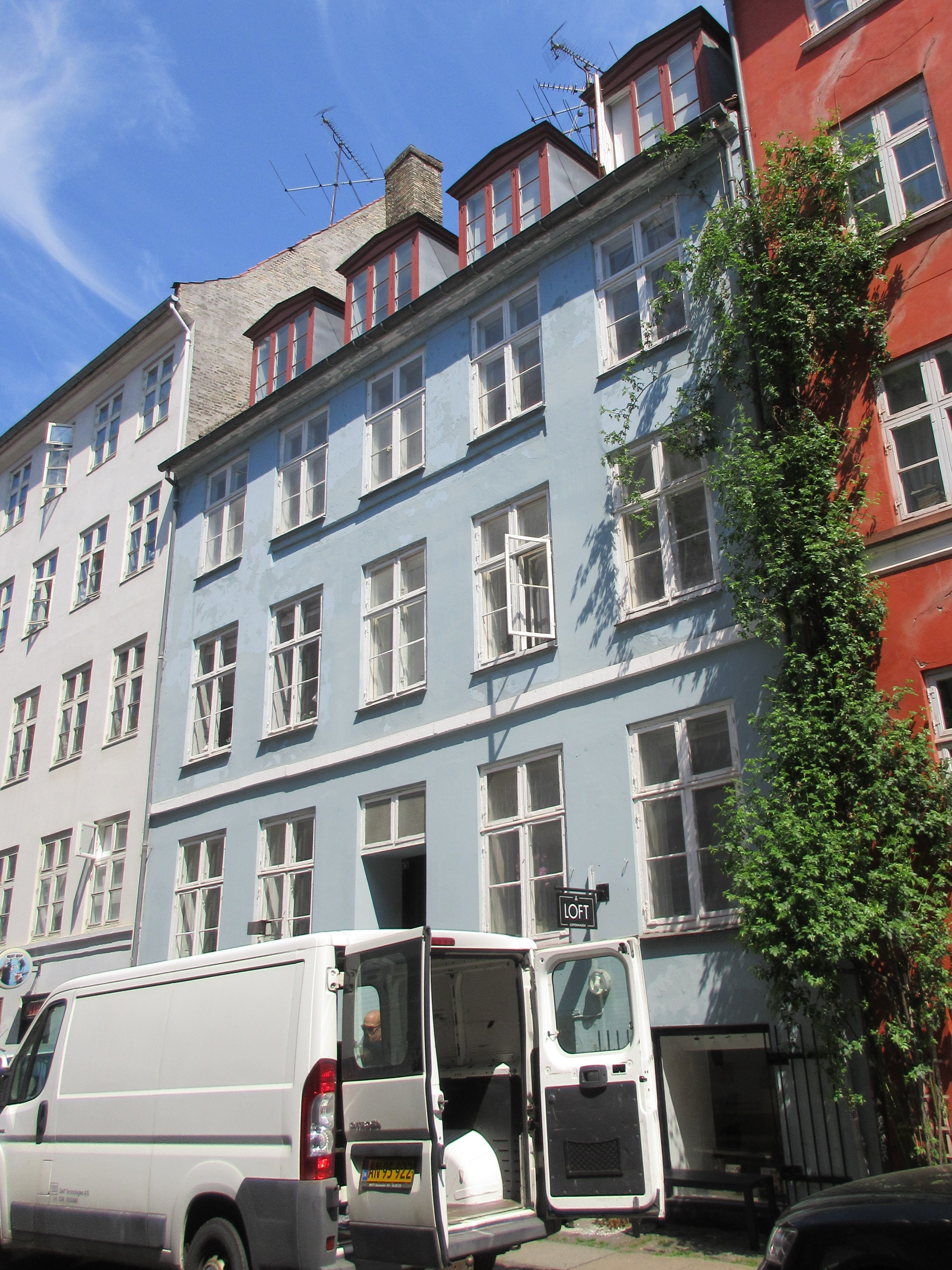
