= Krystalgade 9 =

Building in Copenhagen

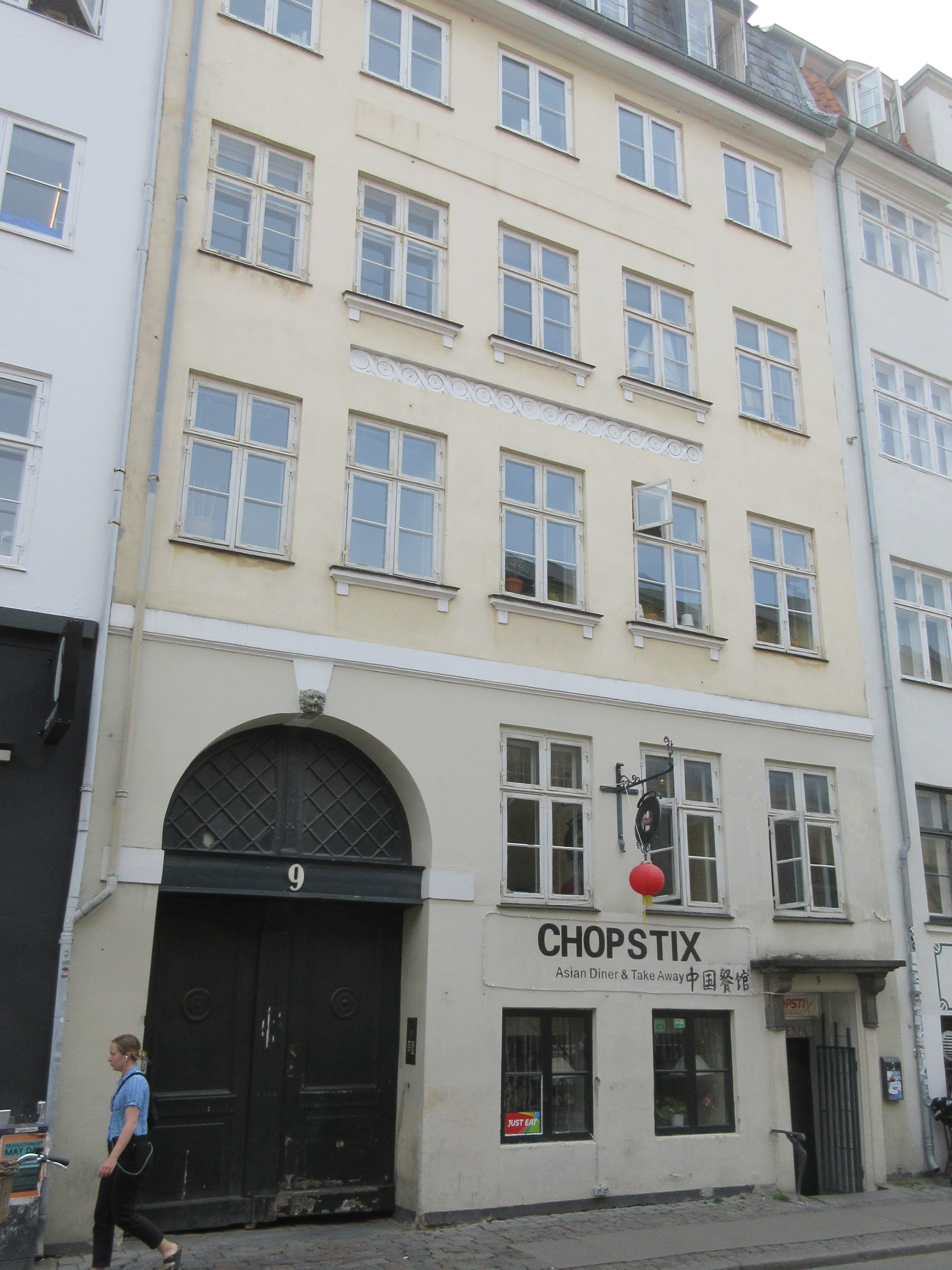
- Interactive map of the Krystalgade 9 area

General information
- Architectural style: Neoclassical
- Location: Copenhagen, Denmark
- Coordinates: 55°40′51.49″N 12°34′26.62″E
- Construction started: 1786

Krystalgade 9 is a Neoclassical property located on the Krystalgade street in the old town of Copenhagen, Denmark. It was listed in the Danish registry of protected buildings and places in 1986.

== History ==
The site was in 1689 part of a larger property (then No. 43) owned by former Vice-Chancellor Holger Vind's widow Margrethe Vind, née Giedde (died 18 January 1706). She was the daughter of Admiral Ove Giedde. In 1756, it was as No. 173 owned by butcher Jacob Giørtzen.

The current building was constructed in 1786 for master klein smith Ole Jensen. The property was in the new cadastre of 1806 listed as No. 53. It was by then owned by captain and klein smith Ole Jensen.

With the introduction of house numbering in Copenhagen in 1859, Klædebo Quarter, No. 53 became Krystalgade 9. The building fronting the street was at the time of the 1860 census home to a total of 40 people. The new rear wing was home to another 16 people.

== Architecture ==
The building is in four storeys over a raised cellar. A two-bay gate with arched transom window is located in the left side of the ground storey. The keystone above the gate features a lion's head. The cellar entrance furthest to the right (west) is topped by a Neoclassical hood mould of sandstone supported by corbels. An embedded stucco frieze is seen between the three central windows on the first and second floor and a slightly projecting, blank frieze is seen between the same windows on the second and third storeys. The mansard roof is clad in slate on the steep lower part and red tile on the upper part.

A perpendicular side wing, partly constructed with timber framing, extends from the rear side of the building. It is at the other end attached to a three and a half bays wide, five-storey rear wing from 1860. All three wings were jointly listed in the Danish registry of protected buildings and places in 1986.

== Today ==
The building is today owned by Jens Ladegaard. It contains a retail space in the ground floor and apartments on the upper floors.
