= Rosengården =

Street in Copenhagen

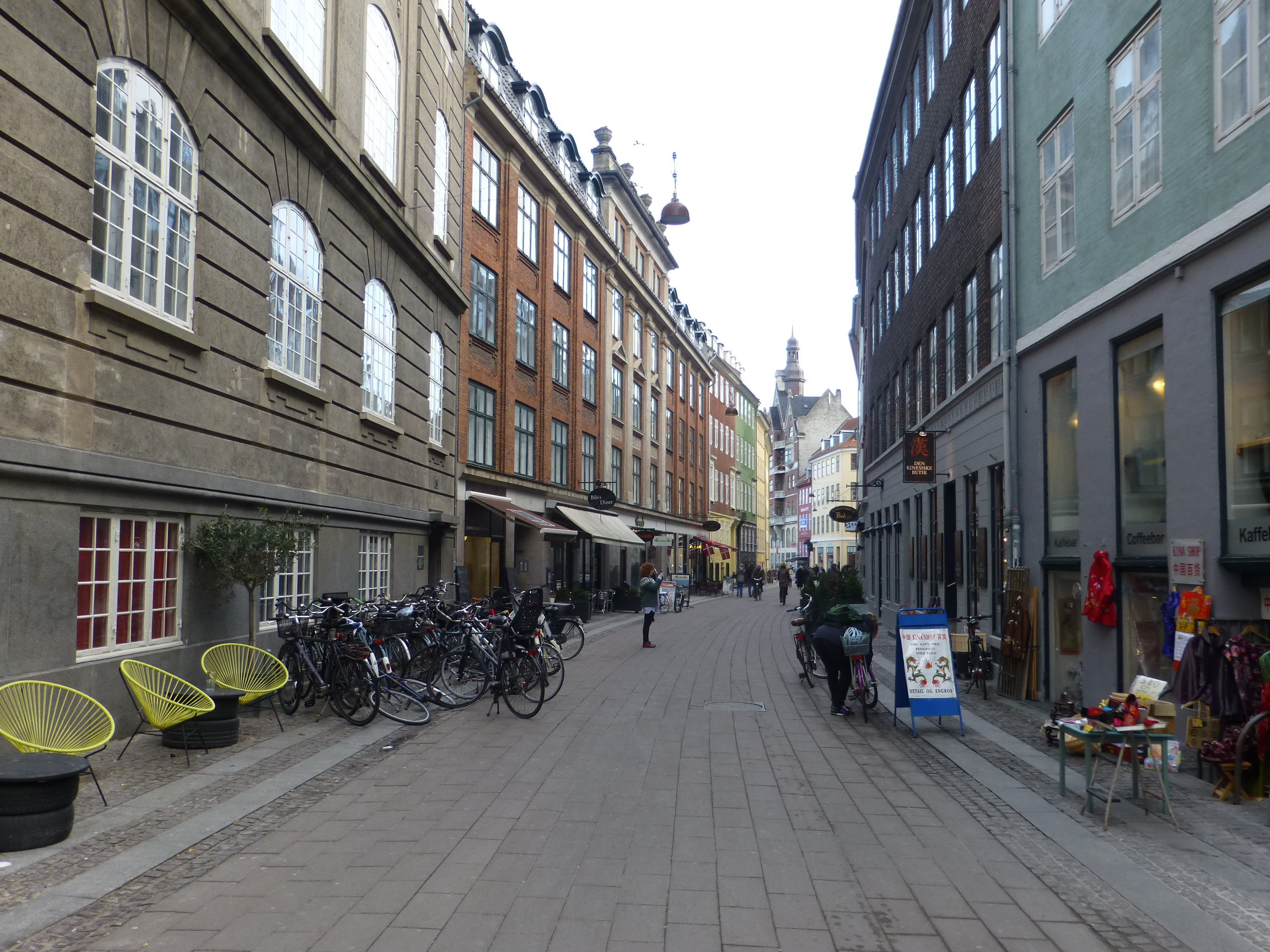
- Length: 105 m (344 ft)
- Location: Indre By, Copenhagen, Denmark
- Postal code: 1174
- Nearest metro station: Nørreport

Rosengården is a small street in the Old Town of Copenhagen, Denmark, linking the pedestrianized street Fiolstræde in the west with the also pedestrianized square Kultorvet in the east. Peder Hvitfeldts Stræde connects the street to Krystalgade to the south. No. 5-7, No. 6 and No. 13 are listed in the Danish registry of protected buildings and places.

== History ==
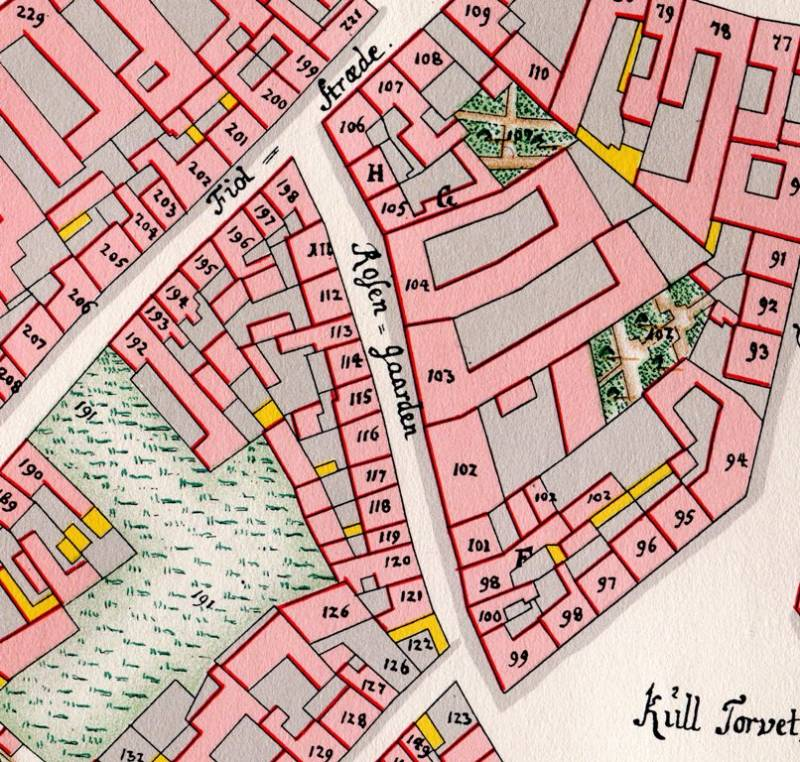
Rosengården seen on Gedde's district map

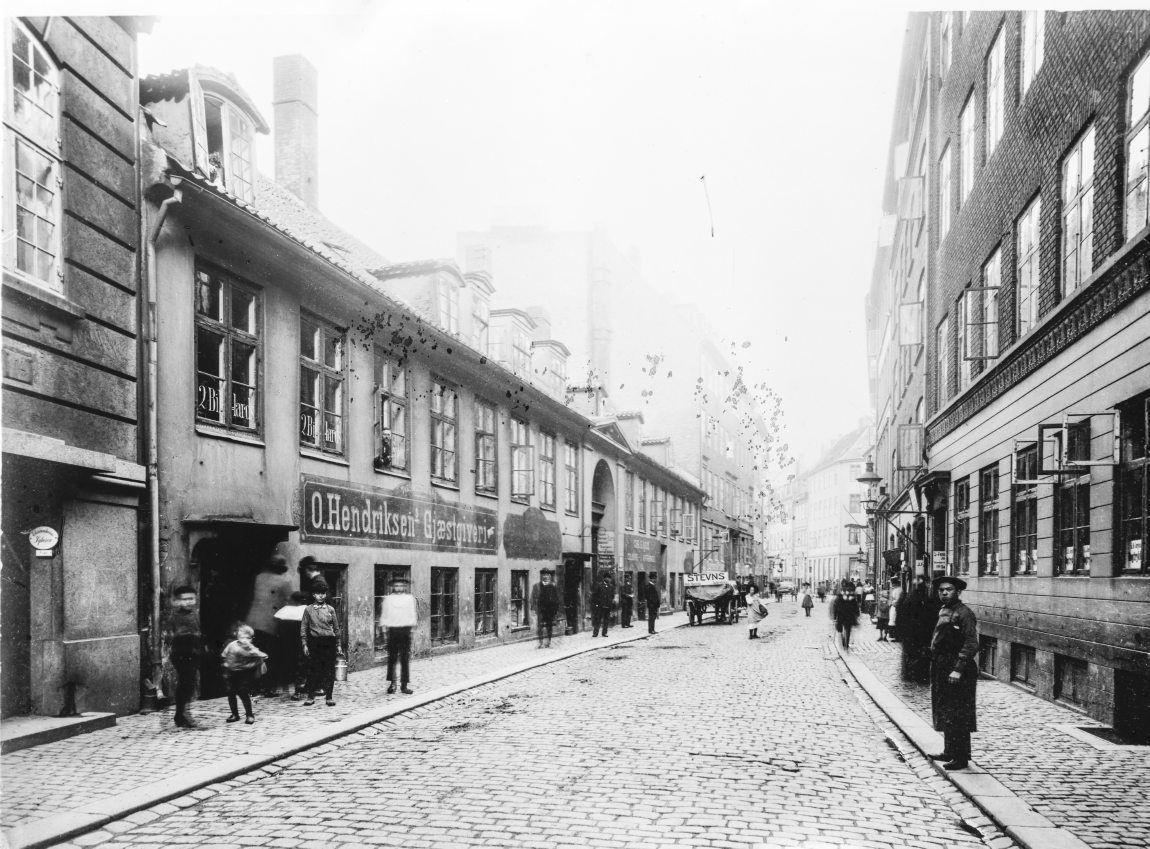
The street with Tvermoes Gård seen to the left

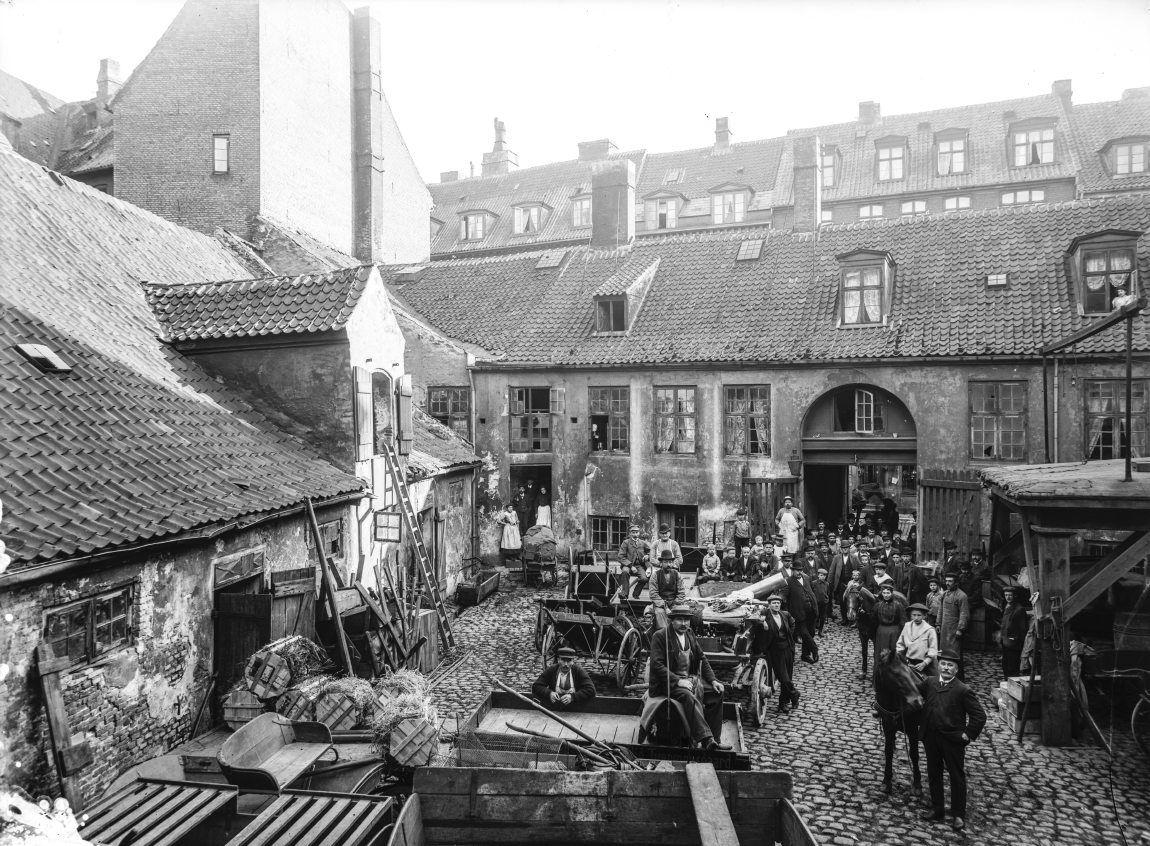
The yard of Tvermoes Gård

The name Rosengården can be traced back to the late 14th century when it referred to an open area with scattered buildings in the area between Krystalgade and the North Rampart. One possibility is that the name referred to the roses that grew in grew in the gardens at One . Another possible explanation is that the nobleman Jens Rosengaard may have owned a house there.

The low Tvermosegård (No. 12) was for many years operated as a guesthouse. It was replaced by a four-storey building in 1905. Marie Christensen established the Copenhagen Maid's School (Københavns Tjenestepigeskole) at No. 14 in 1907. A restaurant was also operated from the premises. The school was converted into a self-owning institution and relocated to Fensmarksgade 65–67 in 1926.

== Notable buildings ==
No. 5, No. 6, No. 7 and No. 13 have been listed on the Danish registry of protected buildings and places. No. 5 and No. 7 were built in 1844-1845 for master saddler J. C. Culmsee. No. 6 was built in 1810–1811 by master carpenter Henrik Tyberg. No. 13 was built in 1850 for destiller N. P. Cadovius, He had in 1840-41 also constructed the neighbouring building at No. 11.

== Public art and memorials ==
The commemorative plaque at No. 9 commemorates that the illustrator and caricaturist P. C. Klæstrup was born in the building. The plaque was installed in 1958 and features a relief portrait of Klæstrup as well as a relief based on his caricature of Søren Kierkegaard.

== Cultural references ==
The writer Arthur Abrahams (1836–1905) mentions Tvermoes Gård in his childhood memoirs Minder fra min barndom og tidlige ungdom.
