= Karen Marie Christensen =

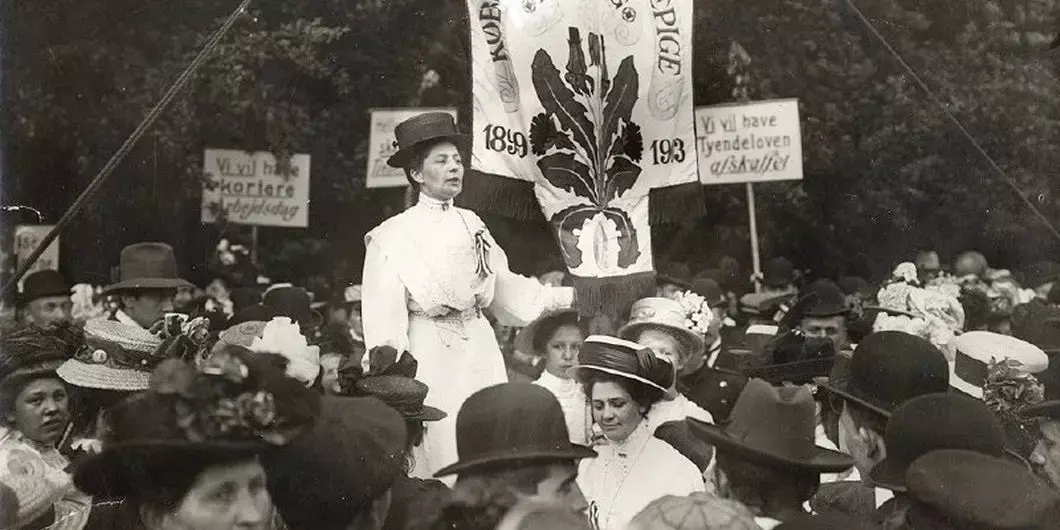
Marie Christensen talks at a public meeting for maids, 1903.

Karen Marie Christensen (3 February 1871, Kregme – 14 September 1945, Copenhagen) was a Danish trade unionist, women's rights activist and politician. She founded the first union for maids in Denmark, serving as the chairman of the Danish Maid Unions (Danish: Tjenestepigeforeninger i Danmark) from 1904 to 1927 and the leader of its trade school, Københavns Tjenestepigeforenings Fagskole (later Husassistenternes Fagskole), from 1906 to 1938. Christensen's primary goal was to obtain stable pay and better working conditions for domestic workers in Denmark. In 1904, she became the first working-class woman to sit on a Danish government commission, which was charged with reexamining the 1854 Tyendeloven (Servants Law).

Christensen was also active in the women's suffrage movement, playing a significant role in ensuring that the vote was also extended to servants. She sat on the Copenhagen municipal council between 1917 and 1921, as a member of the Social Democrats.

== Trade union and labour activism ==
Christensen was a maid. Appalled at the slave-like conditions that servants in Denmark lived under in the 19th century, in 1899 she founded a trade union for maids in Copenhagen (Danish: Københavns Tjenestepigeforening, later incorporated into FOA). Similar unions were subsequently established outside the capital and in 1904 joined together to form Tjenestepigeforeninger i Danmark. Christensen served as its chairman until her retirement in 1927.

Christensen's main goals were to provide maids with stable pay and working conditions and to have the 1854 Servants Law (Tyendeloven) repealed. The law put domestic workers at a disadvantage compared to other professions, giving employers the right to discipline their servants, and to keep a life-long conduct book (skudsmålsbog) recording an assessment of their work. In 1904, the Justice Minister Peter Adler Alberti appointed Christensen to a commission to reexamine the Servants Law. She was the first working-class woman in Denmark to sit on a government commission. The commission's work between 1905 and 1910 did not immediately lead to results, nor did the 1921 Assistants Law (Medhjælperloven) fully satisfy Christensen's desire for labour reform for domestic workers. However, the conduct books and right to discipline were abolished.

Christensen founded Københavns Tjenestepigeforenings Fagskole on Rosengården in 1906, and was its leader until 1938. It served as the headquarters of the union, with an editorial office, employment agency, library, trade school, and meeting rooms. There was also a restaurant serving food cooked by students. The school later changed its name to Husassistenternes Fagskole and closed in 1972, after having trained several thousand domestic workers. Another of Christensen's goals was the creation of a retirement home for maids. This was realised in 1935, with the opening of the Husassistenternes Byggeforening og Alderdomshjem, which she herself moved into.

== Politics ==
The 1849 Danish Constitution denied the vote to women and servants. When women's suffrage in parish and municipal elections began to be discussed in 1901–1904, Christensen was amongst those who launched a campaign to ensure that servants were also included. In 1904, she was one of the founders of the Political Women's Society (Politisk Kvindeforening) and became a member of its board. She later joined the Danish Women's Society's Suffrage Union and served as its treasurer for many years. She was one of the delegates to the Fourth Conference of the International Woman Suffrage Alliance in Amsterdam in 1908.

Christensen was also involved with the Social Democratic Party. She was a board member of its voters' association in the Rosenborg constituency, and was elected to Copenhagen's municipal council in 1917, the first time the Social Democrats secured a majority in the municipality. She served on the council until 1921, and was amongst other things concerned with housing and urban renewal policy, especially in the inner city of Copenhagen. She wanted to run for the Rigsdag, but the party did not select her.
