= Krystalgade =

Street in Copenhagen, Denmark

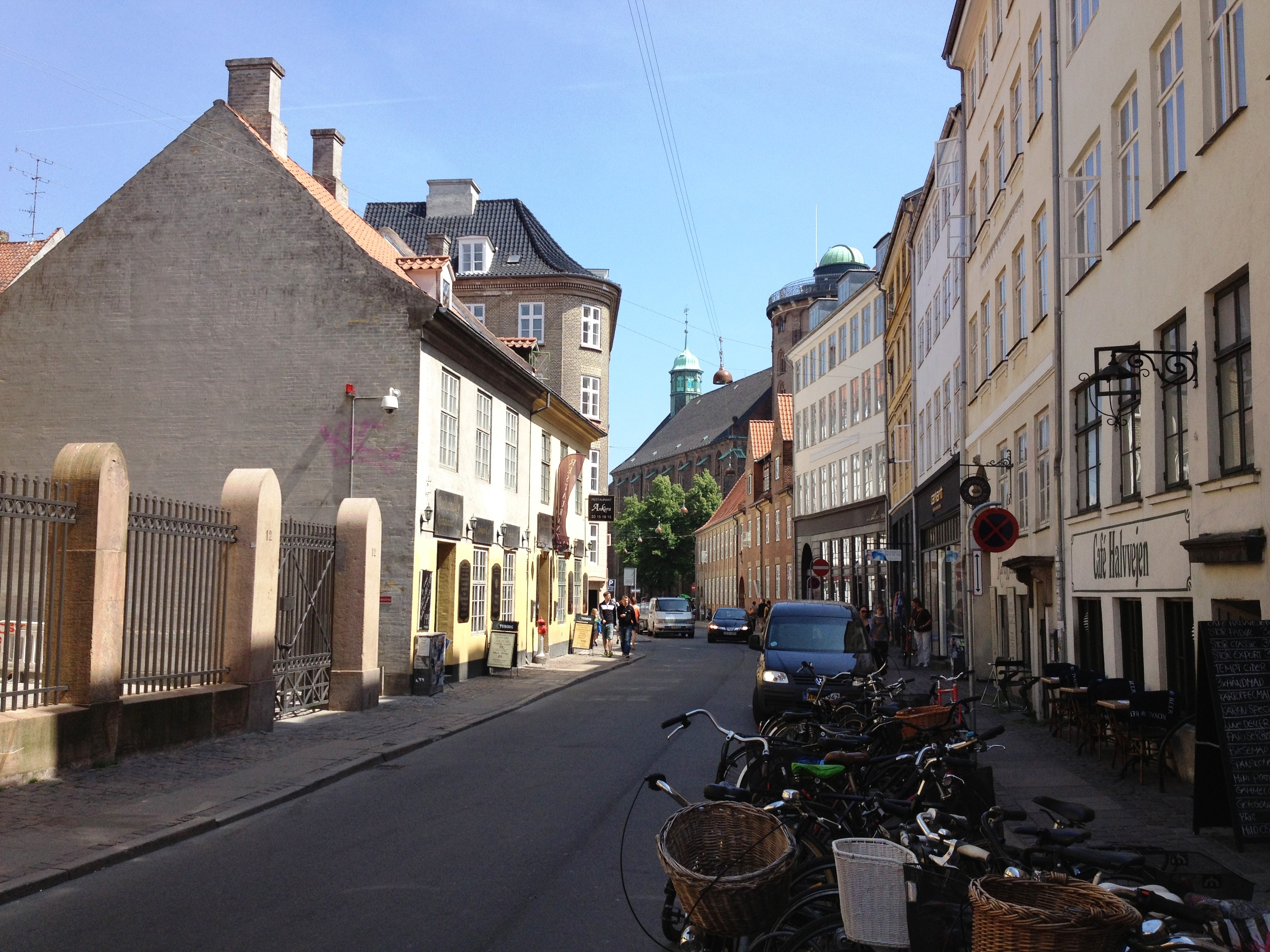
- Krystalgade
- Length: 275 m (902 ft)
- Location: Indre By, Copenhagen, Denmark
- Postal code: 1172
- Coordinates: 55°40′51.24″N 12°34′24.96″E

Krystalgade (literally "Crystal Street") is a street in central Copenhagen, Denmark, connecting Nørregade to Købmagergade. Copenhagen Central Library and the Great Synagogue of Copenhagen are located in the street.

== History ==
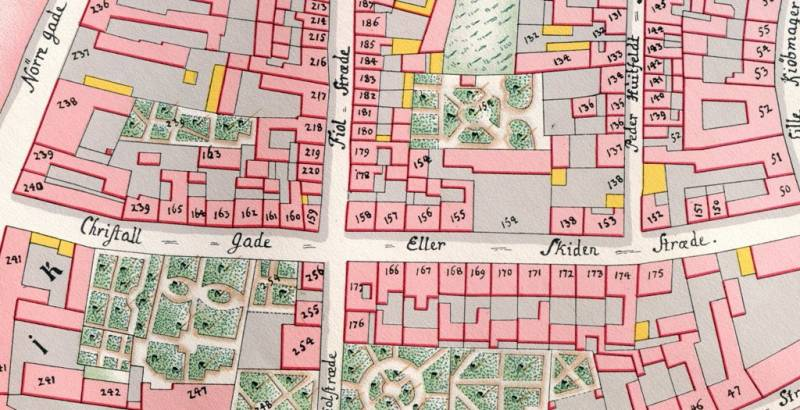
Skidenstræde seen on Gedde's district map

The street is mentioned in 1492 as "a small alley leading to Cabtor's gate" and again in 1528 as "the alley to the rear of Cantor's gate reaching from Nørregade to Købmagergade". From 1600, it is referred to as Skidenstræde (Schiden Strede), literally "Shitty Alley", probably due to the odeur from a covered sewer which passed under it. It was divided into Store Skidenstræde ("Great Shitty Street") and Lille Skidenstræde ("Little Shitty Street"), located west and east of Fiolstræde respectively. University of Copenhagen's first botanical garden was located on the south side of Store Skidenstræde.

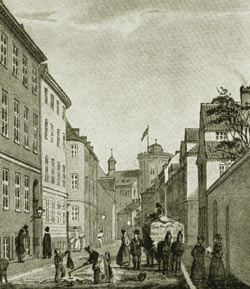
Old picture from the street

At some point, Store Skidenstræde became colloquially known as Krystalgade. The name (Cristal Gade) is seen on Gedde's map of Copenhagen from 1757 where it is given as an alternative to Skidenstræde. The full length of the street was paved with cobblestones in 1818. House owners in the street then filed a formal request with Danish Chancellery that the official name of the street be changed to Krystalgade. They pointed out that the street now appeared as a "fine and real street" which provided an excellent connection between Church of Our Lady and Trinity Church, the two most important churches in Copenhagen at the time, and that it was therefore likely to be used for religious processions. They also pointed out that several residents in the street were involved in trade with Germany and the Netherlands and that phrases such as "Mijn Heer… in de Schietstraat tot Copenhagen" could leave their foreign business connections with the impression that they lived in a sewer. Danish Chancellery forwarded the letter to Copenhagen's magistrate who consulted city architect Jørgen Henrich Rawert on the matter. He replied somewhat reluctantly that a name change lacked adequate grounds. Similar requests from houseowners in other streets had previously been rejected. He further stated that although the house owners had offered to pay for the painting of new street signs, it would still lead to significant inconvenience and expenses to update other documents, such as mortgage and fire insurance protocols and existing insurance policies. In spite of his reservations, King Frederick VI approved the name change on 21 October 1818.

== Notable buildings and residents ==
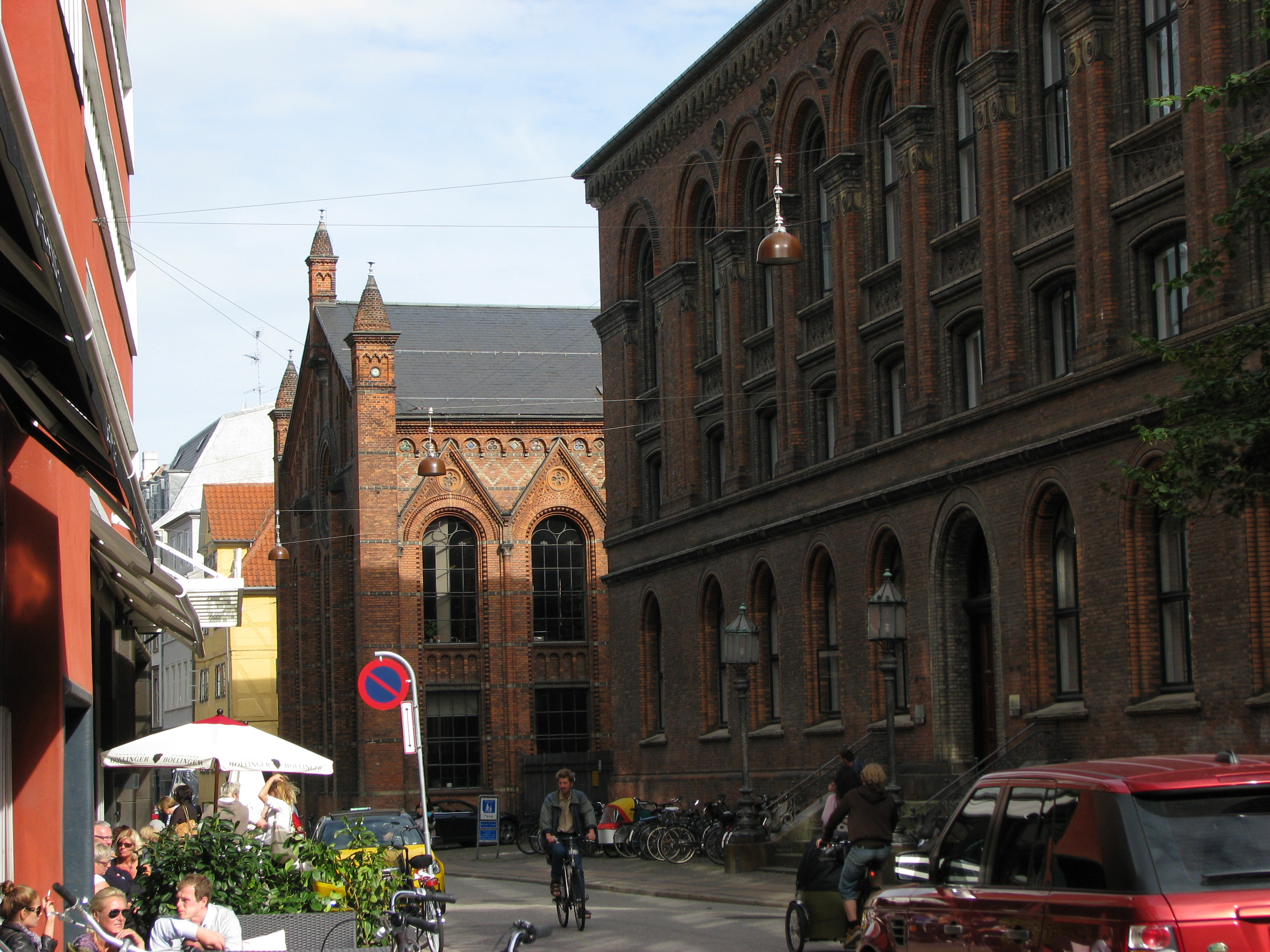
The former Museum of Zoology (right) and Copenhagen University Library (left) viewed from Krystalgade

The sections of the street between Nørregade and Fiolstræde mark the northern margin of the University Quadrangle which also comprises University of Copenhagen's old main building on Frue Plads and the former Copenhagen University Library on Fiolstræde. The university's first Zoological Museum was built on Krystalgade in 1870 to a Neoclassical design by Christian Hansen. The museum building and the library flank a courtyard space separated from the street by an iron fence. On the other side of the street is the five-star Hotel Skt. Petri, located in the former Daells Varehus department store. The original building was designed by Vilhelm Lauritzen and was one of the first pieces of Functionalist architecture in Denmark.

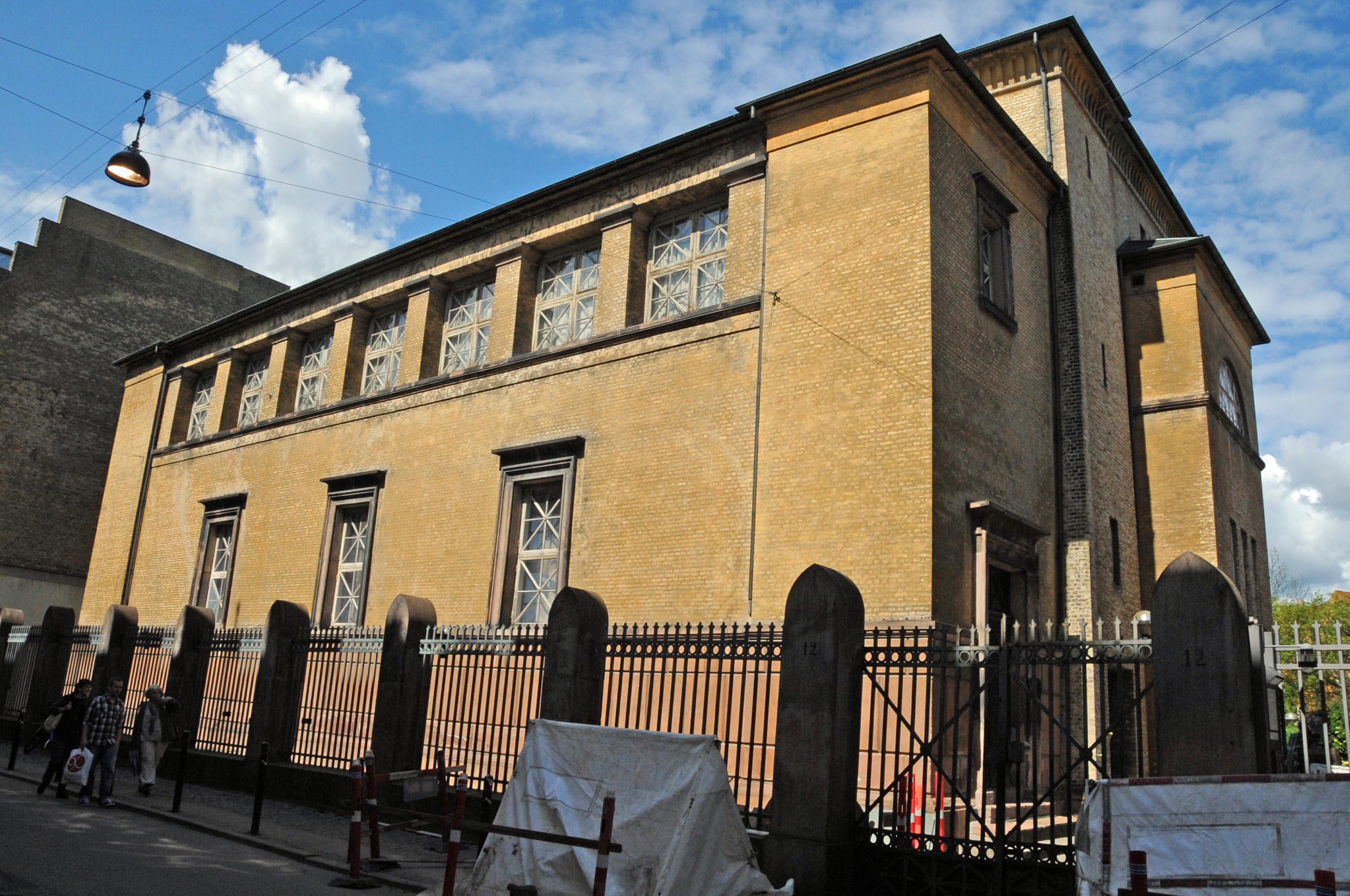
Great Synagogue of Copenhagen

On the opposite side of Fiolstræde is the Great Synagogue of Copenhagen. It was designed by Gustav Friedrich Hetsch. It is located across the street from Copenhagen Central Library. The two-story building on the corner with Peder Hvitfeldts Stræde is a former Latin school associated with the Church of Our Lady. The building is from 1821.

== See also ==
- Store Kannikestræde
