= Fiolstræde =

Shopping street in Copenhagen, Denmark

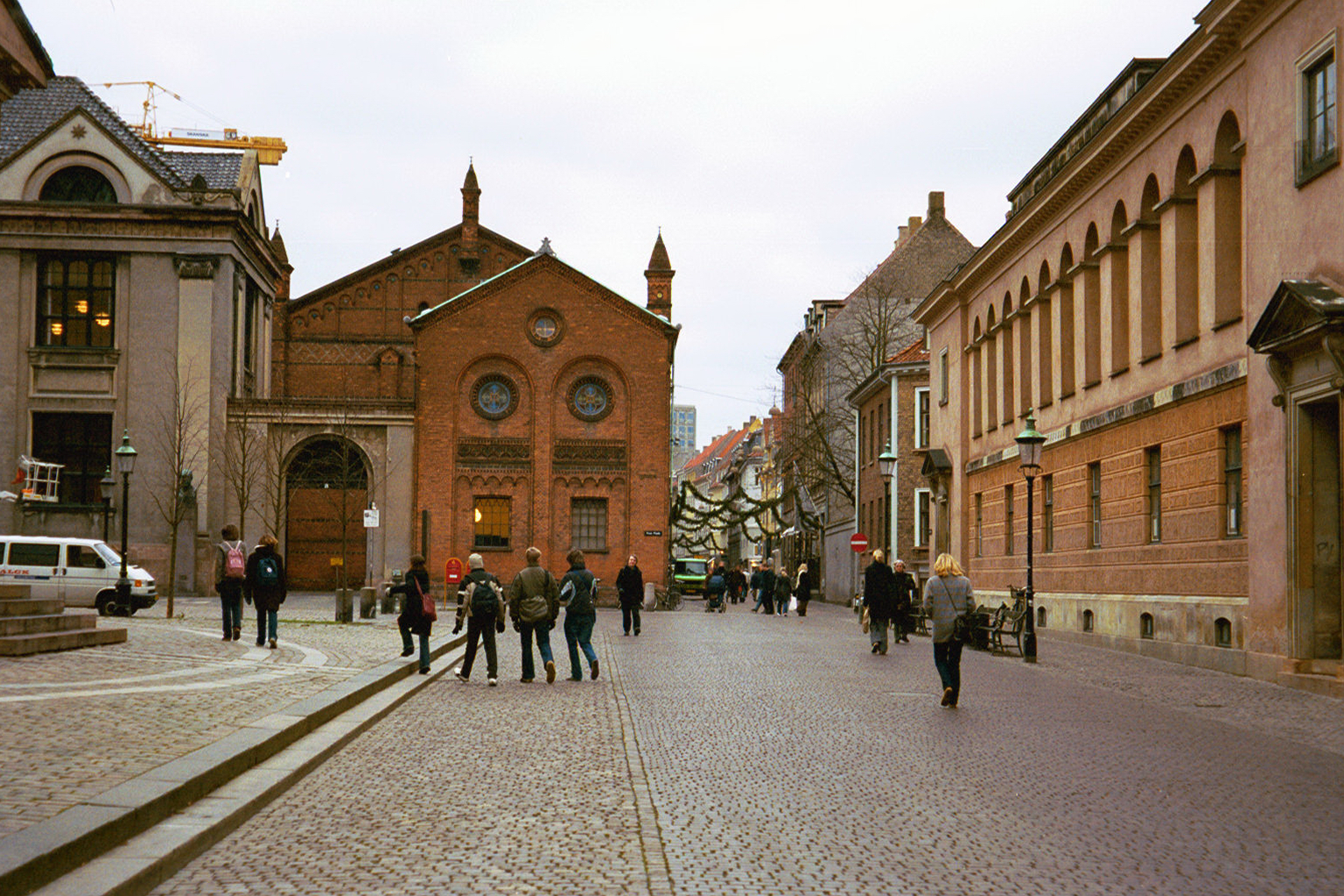
- Fiolstræde with the former Copenhagen University Library in the foreground
- Length: 445 m (1,460 ft)
- Location: Indre By, Copenhagen, Denmark
- Postal code: 1171
- Nearest metro station: Nørreport
- Coordinates: 55°40′53″N 12°34′21″E

Fiolstræde is a pedestrianised shopping street in central Copenhagen, Denmark. It passes the square Frue Plads on its way from Nørreport station in the north to Skindergade in the south where Jorcks Passage connects it to the shopping street Strøget. Copenhagen Cathedral is located on the street which also passes the rear side of Copenhagen University Library.

== History ==
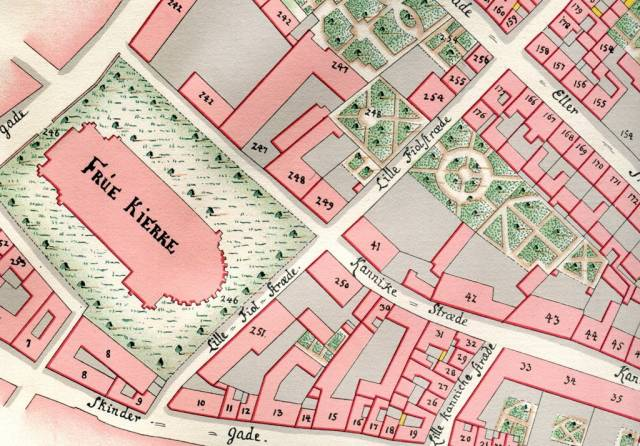
Lille Fiolstræde seen on Gedde's maps of Copenhagen from 1757

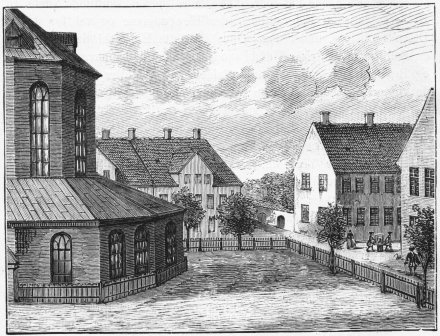
Ludvig Holberg's residence in Fiolstræde

The area along the street was until the 17th century dominated by green areas, and the name more likely refers to the violet flower (Danish: viol) rather than the fiddle (Danish: fiol). The section from Nørre Voldgade to Krystalgade was originally called Store Fiolstræde (Large Violet Alley) while the section from Krystalgade to Skindergade was called Lille Fiolstræde (Small Violet Alley).

Ludvig Holberg lived the last years of his life (died 1754) in a professorial residence at No. 8. The building was destroyed during the British bombardment of Copenhagen in 1807. A plaque on the wall at No. 8 commemorates the event.

The street was formerly known for its many used bookstores. Fiolstræde was pedestrianised in 1968 following the successful pedestrianisation of Strøget in the early 1960s. The narrow street (8 metres) was considered a natural second phase in the pedestrianisation of the area after the closure of Strøget in 1962.

== Notable buildings and residents ==
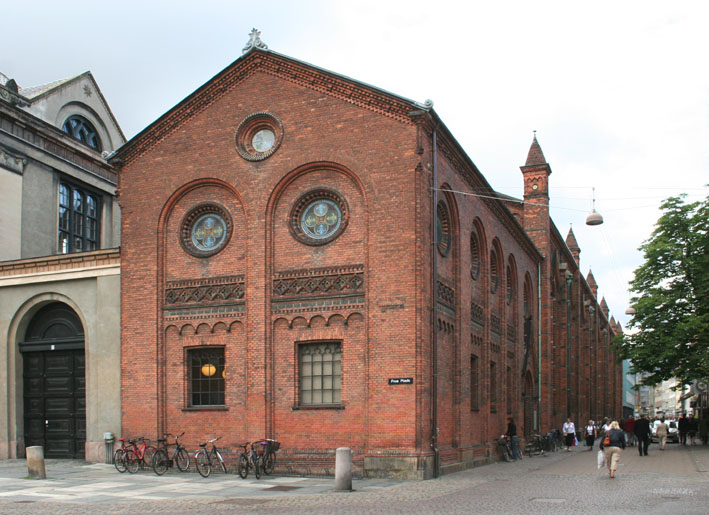
Herholdt's University Library, the gable towards Frue Plads

The most notable building in the street is the former Copenhagen University Library. It was completed in 1861 to a Historicist design by Johan Daniel Herholdt.

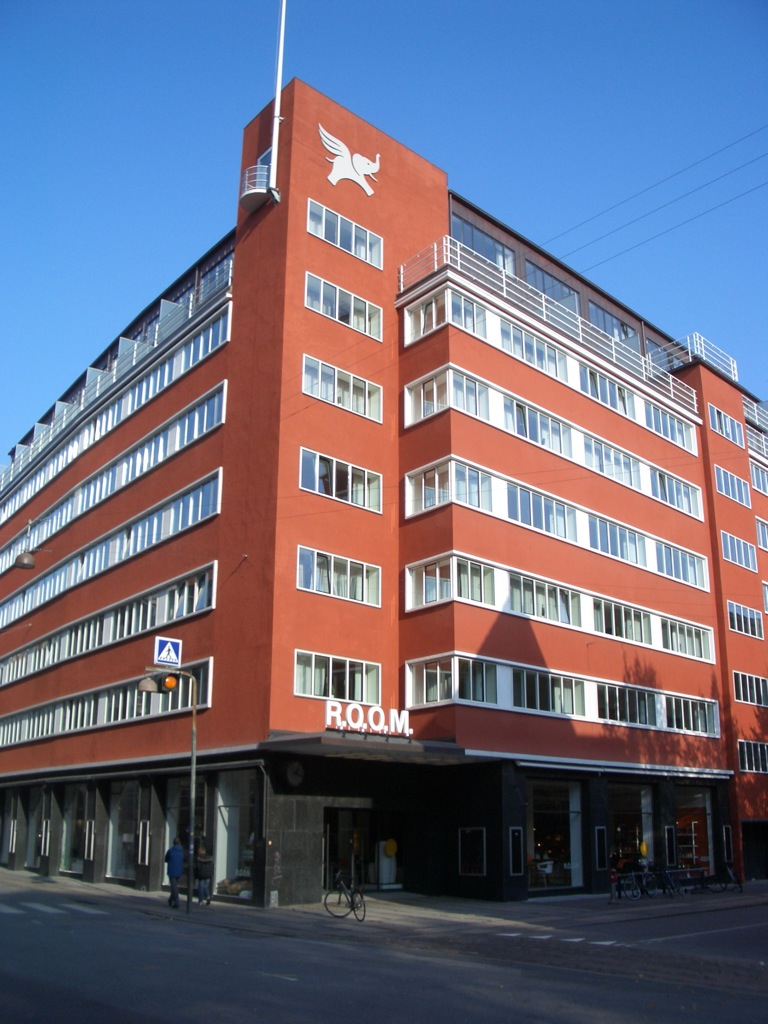
Hotel Sankt Petri.

No. 4–6 is the former Metropolitan School from 1811–15. It was designed by Christian Frederik Hansen who was also responsible for the rebuilding of Church of Our Lady on the other side of the street in the years after the British bombardment.

Hotel Sankt Petri is located in the former Daells Varehus department store. Built in 1935, it was one of the first buildings designed by Vilhelm Lauritzen and one of the earliest Modernist buildings in Copenhagen.

Stiftsprovstsboligen (No 8), located on the corner of Store Kanikkestræde, was built in 1841 as official residence for the provost (Stiftsprovst) at Church of Our Lady. The house and a section of wall shielding the courtyard from the street was listed in 1939.

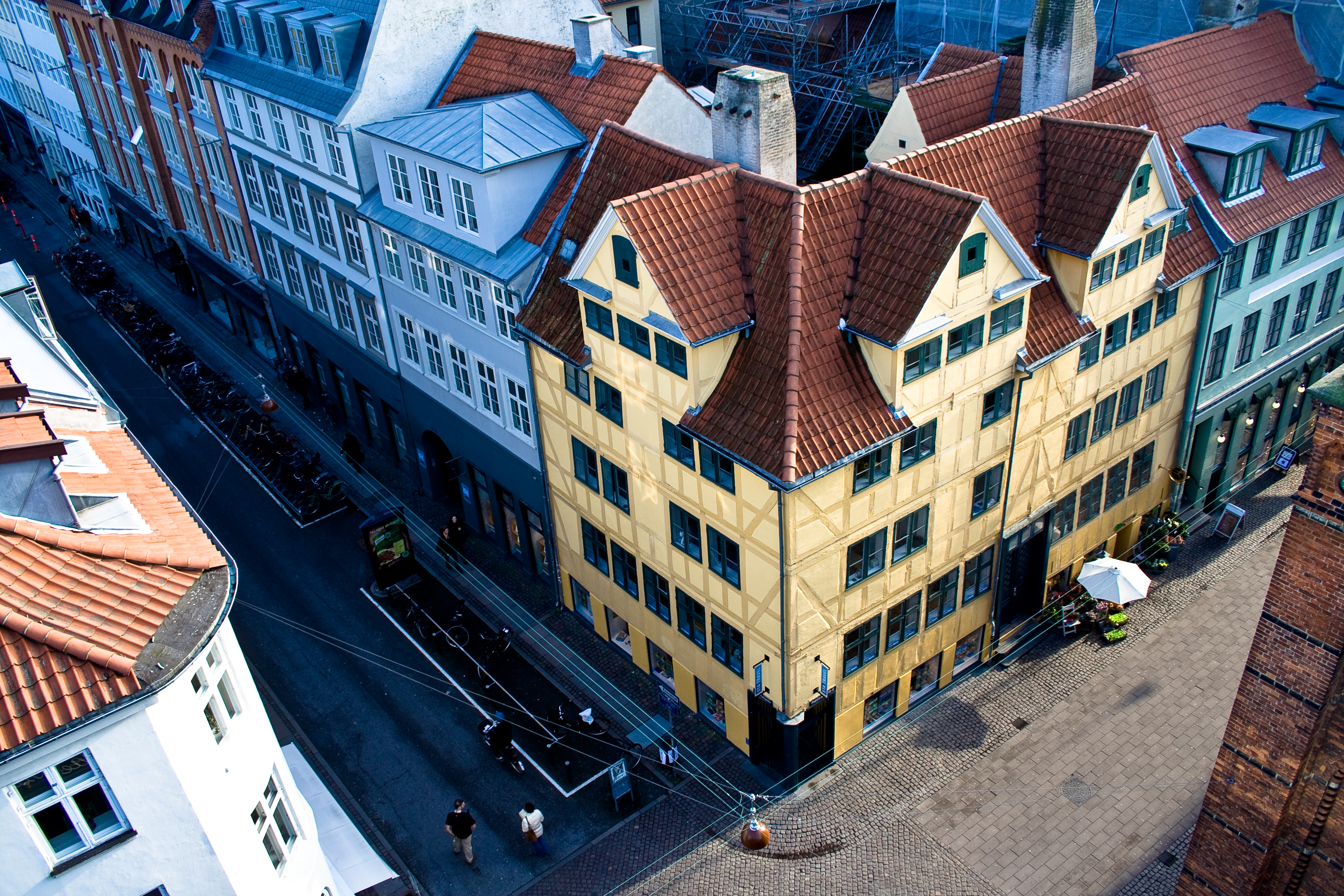
No. 18 on the corner with Krystalgade

No. 11 (1828), No. 12–14 (1839), No. 13 (1831), No. 15 (1834), No. 16 (1732), No. 17 (1851), No. 18 (1734), No. 19 (1836), No. 20 (1811), No. 21 (1836), No. 12 (1835), No. 24 (1857), No. 25–27 (13–15), No. 26 (1809), No. 28 (1814–51), No. 29 (1810), No. 30—32 (1809/1823), No. 34–36 (1812), No. 38 (1827) and No. 40–42 (1828) are also listed.

The Neo-Baroque building with a rounded corner on Nørre Voldgade was built for the School of Merchantry (Købmandsskolen) in 1902 to design by Valdemar and Bernhard Ingemann. It still houses one of the campuses of Niels Brock Copenhagen Business College.

== Public art and memorials ==
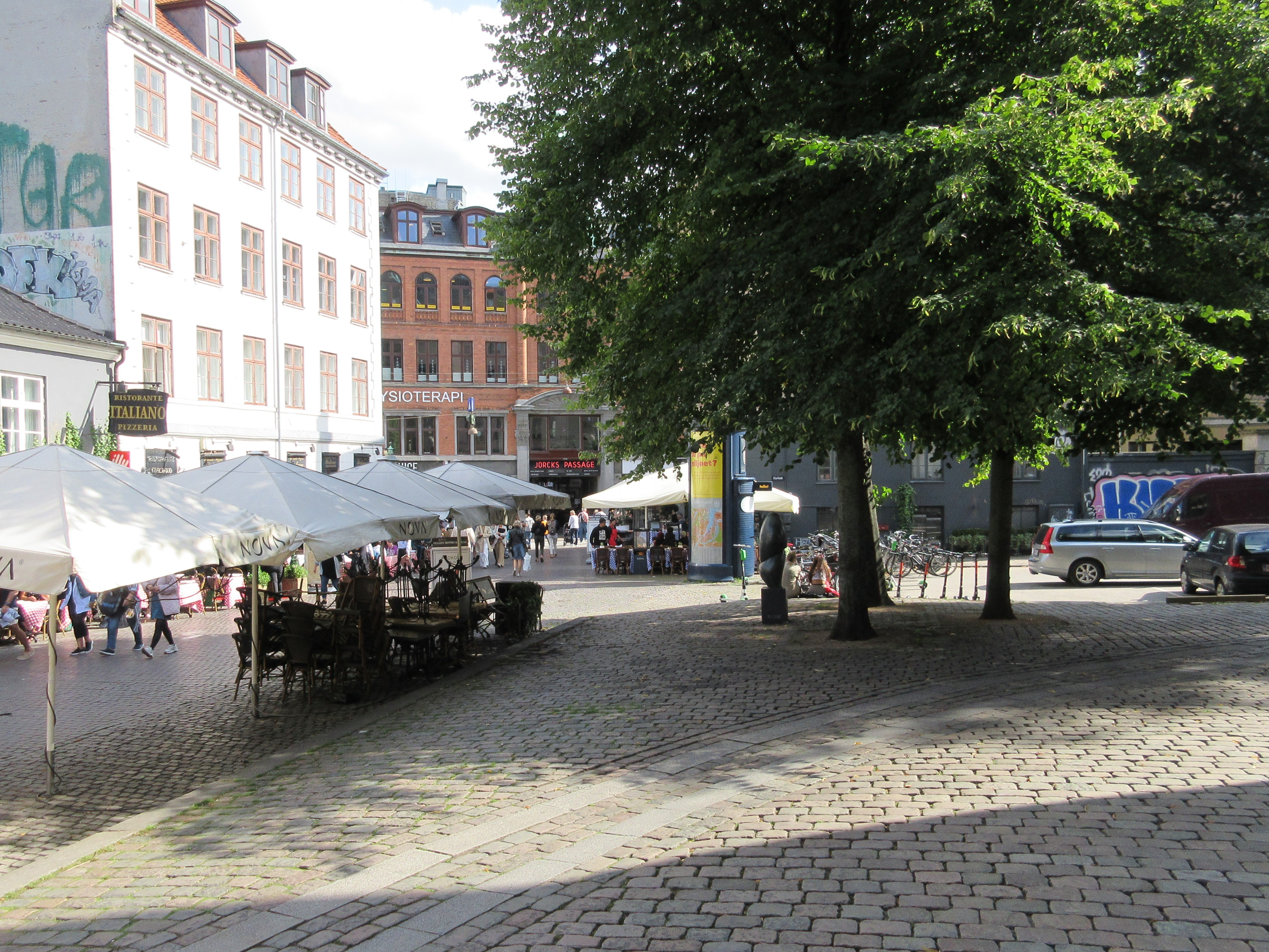
Jean Arp's abstract sculpture Cupulate Fruit

Under a group of trees at the southern end of the street stands Jean Arp's abstract sculpture Cupulate Fruit. It was installed at the site in 1979.

In front of Copenhagen University Library's gable towards Frue Plads stands a monument to the geophysicist Inge Lehmann. It was unveiled on 15 May 2017.

== Today ==
Today pedestrian traffic is consistent throughout the year due to the presence of students during winter (about 11–12,000 people daily). However, it is a quiet street on weekends and evenings.
