= Tikøb =

- Town
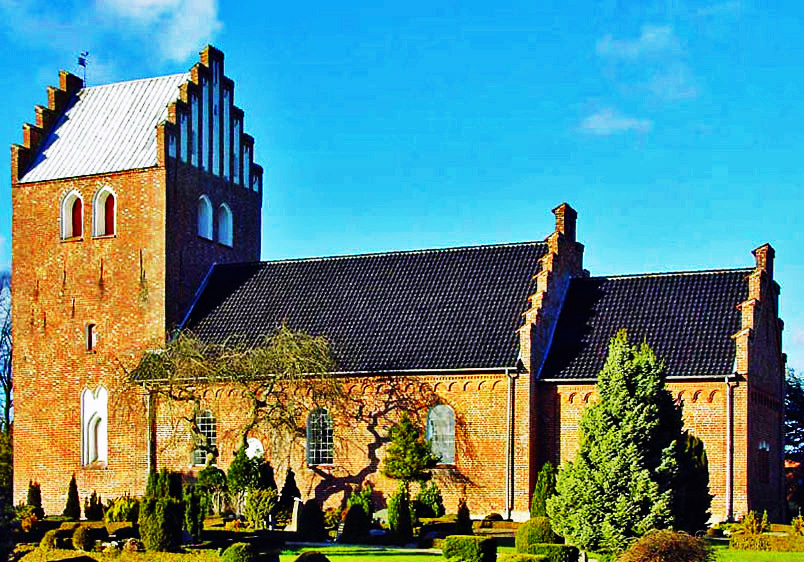

- Location in Denmark
- Coordinates: 56°1′N 12°27′E
- Country: Denmark
- Region: Capital (Hovedstaden)
- Municipality: Helsingør

Population (2026)
  - Total: 701
- Time zone: UTC+1 (CET)
  - Summer (DST): UTC+2 (CEST)
- Postal code: DK-3080 Tikøb

Tikøb is a small town and parish located 8 km west of Helsingør and six km north of Fredensborg, between Lake Esrum to the southwest and Gurre Lake to the east. in Helsingør Municipality, some 40 km north of Copenhagen, Denmark.

== History ==
Tikøb was probably founded during the late Viking period. The name is first documented as Tiwithcop in Esrom Abbey's Book of Letters (Esrum Klosters Brevbog) in 1170. It is believed that that name means "acquired land in/by the forest dedicated to the Gods". The sparsely populated was the largest parish on Zealand and one of the largest in Denmark.

The village was originally located on three sides of a small lake. For centuries the village consisted of six farms, one of which was the rectory, a few other houses, an inn, and a forge. The first school in Tikøb, a so-called rytterskole, was built in 1722.

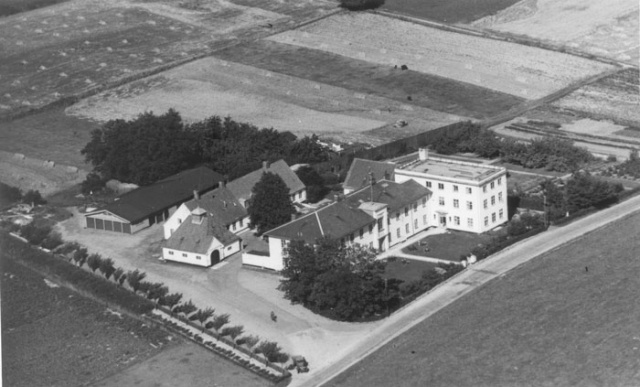
The town hall and retirement home in 1948: The two buildings parallel to the road are part of the original Tikøb Workhouse; the small building to the left was built for the fire department in 1931 and the tall building to the right is from 1943–44

When the new civil parishes (sognekommuner) were established in 1942, Tikøb became the administrative centre of Tikøb–Hornbæk–Hellebæk (later referred to as Tikøb Kommune or Tikøb Municipality).

The parish had a large population of poor people who were attracted by the opportunity to work in the local forest industry. In 1861, a large social institution named Tikøb Workhouse (Tikøb Forsørgelses- og Arbejdsanstalt) was built on the outskirts of town, replacing the old poorhouses. It was one of the first institutions of its kind in Denmark located outside a market town. The newly established local fire department was also based at the same site. A few years later in 1867 a municipal office (kommunekontor) with daily opening hours, another new feature at the site, opened in the same building complex. From 1877, the institution also had a section for psychiatric patients.

A post office also opened in the 1860s. A windmill was built in 1873, a co-operative dairy opened in 1893, and Tikøb Brugsforening was founded in 1920. The town was also home to a post office and several other stores.

In the first half of the 20th century, it was increasingly small communities that became the focus of development. In 1954, both the town hall and the retirement home moved to Esperglærde. The old municipal seat in Tikøb was sold to Copenhagen Municipality and used as a retirement home under the name Gyrrelund. The new Hornbækvej was constructed in the 1930s as an eastern bypass. Tikøb Lake dried out in the 1950s and together with the new road Harreshøjvej in 1964, this led to the establishment of a new neighbourhood. The 1970 the Danish Municipal Reform merged Tikøb Municipality with Helsingør Municipality.

== Description ==
Tikøb Church was probably built by monks from Esrum Abbey. The nave and chancel date from the end of the 12th century. Gurrelund, the former municipal seat, retirement home and fire station, has been converted into a complex with 16 apartments. It has a 30,000 square metre park. Tikøb's old school from 1722 is located at Præstegaardsvej 11. It remained in use until 1912 when the new Tikøb School was built.

Two of the original farms, Stengaard and Søgaard (now called Møllegård), are still found in their original location. Two have been moved to locations outside the village, one has been dissolved and the rectory burned down in 1939.

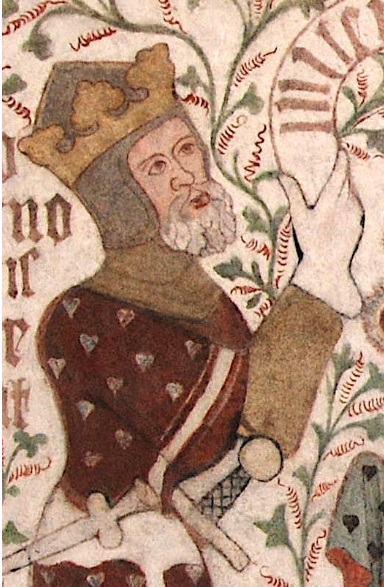
Waldemar IV of Denmark, ca. 1375

== Notable people ==
Notable people that were born or lived in Tikøb include:

- Valdemar IV of Denmark (1320 in Tikøb – 1375) was king of Denmark from 1340 to 1375.
- Christopher, Duke of Lolland (1341 in Tikøb – 1363), Duke of Lolland, was the son of King Valdemar IV of Denmark
- Ludvig Munthe (1593 in Tikøb – 1649), Bishop of Bjørgvin (Bergen)
- Jacob Andersen (1892 in Tikøb - 1955) a sailor, competed at the 1928 Summer Olympics
- Jan Grarup (born 1968 in Kvistgaard, near Tikøb) a Danish photojournalist

== See also ==
Esbønderup
