= Dronningmølle =

- Town
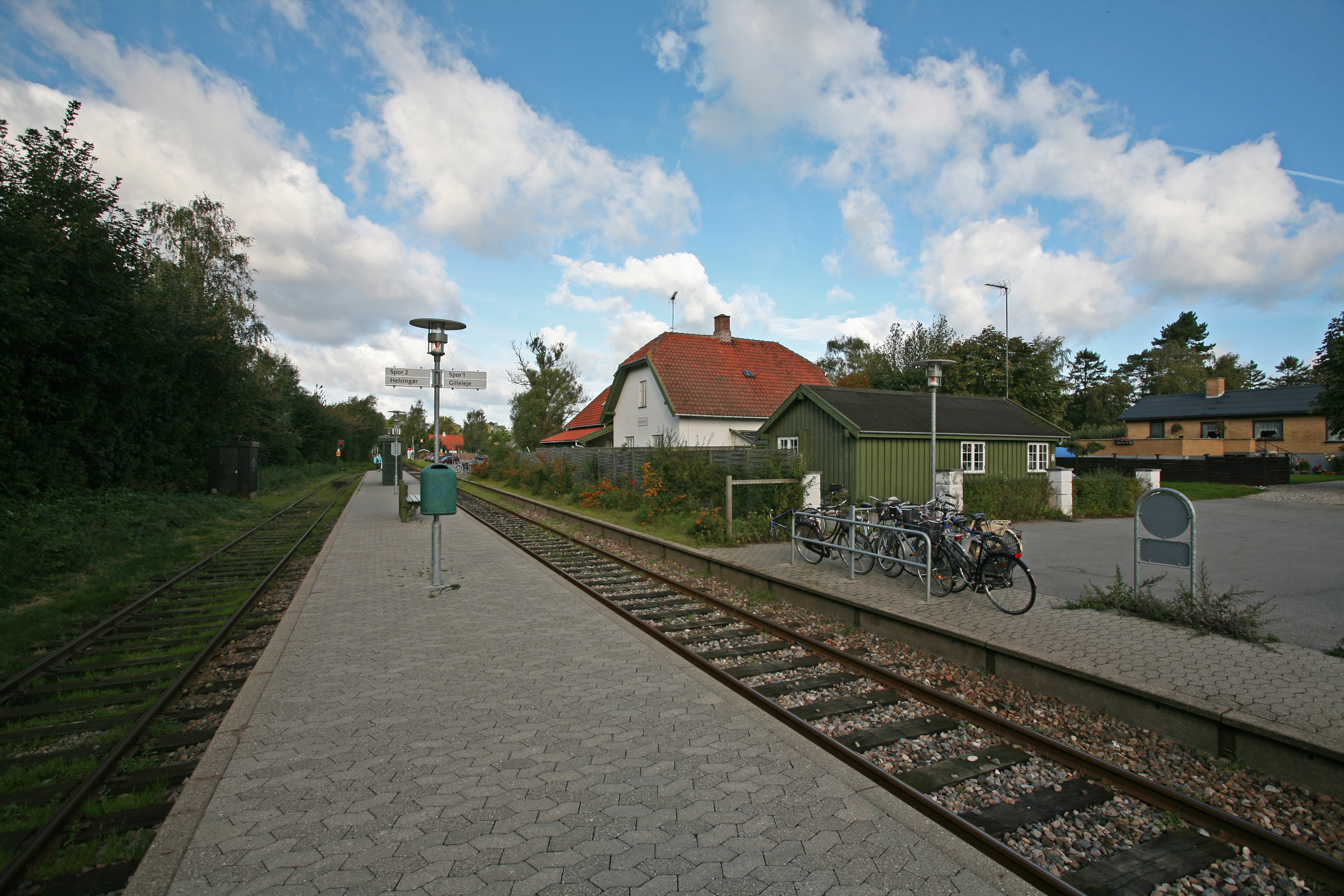
- Dronningmølle Station

- Location in Denmark Dronningmølle (Capital Region)
- Coordinates: 56°5′55″N 12°23′9″E
- Country: Denmark
- Region: Capital Region of Denmark
- Municipality: Gribskov Municipality

Area
  - Town: 4.6 km^{2} (1.8 sq mi)

Population (2026)
  - Town: 1,460
  - Density: 320/km^{2} (820/sq mi)
- Time zone: UTC+1 (CET)
  - Summer (DST): UTC+2 (CEST)

Dronningmølle (Danish pronunciation: [tʁʌne̝ŋˈmølə]) is a seaside resort town in Esbønderup parish, Gribskov Municipality in the Capital Region of Denmark, of eastern Denmark. Dronningmølle is located 4 kilometers west of Hornbæk, 6 kilometers east of Gilleleje and 22 kilometers north of Hillerød. The town is served by Dronningmølle Station on the Hornbæk Line.

Since 2010 Dronningmølle has grown together with its neighbouring town Hornbæk in Helsingør Municipality to form an urban area with a combined population of 5,065 as of 1 January 2026. Hornbæk proper had a population of 3,605 with Dronningmølle, incl. Munkerup, having 1,460.

== History ==
The name Dronningmølle, literally "queen's mill", comes from a water mill located close to the point where the stream Esrum Å runs into the Kattegat. The first water mill at the site was built by monks from Esrum Abbey. In 1588, it was replaced by a new water mill which was commissioned by Frederick II of Denmark and named after his wife, Queen Sophie, possibly because she owned the site on which it was built. Valentin von Spangenberg, who also worked on Kronborg Castle and many other road and mill projects in the area, was charged with the construction of the complex.

The nearest settlements were Villingerød and Villingebæk which are both mentioned in documents from the early days of Esrum Abbey. Located a couple of kilometres inland, Villingerød, literally "The forest dwellers' clearing", was with its 10 farms the largest village in Esbønderup parish. Villingebæk, literally "The forest dwellers' stream", a reference to the location at Pandehave Å, consisted of a mixture of fishermen's houses and small farmsteads. It prospered from the fishing of herring in the 16th century but was hit hard by sand drift in the 17th and 18th century.

Since the beginning of the 20th century, thanks to its sandy beach, the locality has been a popular resort with hotels and guest houses along the coast road. Today, it has some 1,500 summerhouses reaching up to two kilometres inland. Until 1946, Kassegård, a large thatched house had stood for centuries on the corner of Villingerødvej and Linde Alle.

Dronningmølle Station on the Helsingør-Gilleleje line was initially opened to serve Dronningmølle Teglverk, a brick factory established in 1898 by the coffee merchant Ferdinand Andersen. For a time, the local fishermen were opposed to the growing importance of the factory but, as Andersen bought up most of the area, they were eventually forced to work there. The brickyard was closed in 1947 and subsequently demolished.

== Landmarks ==
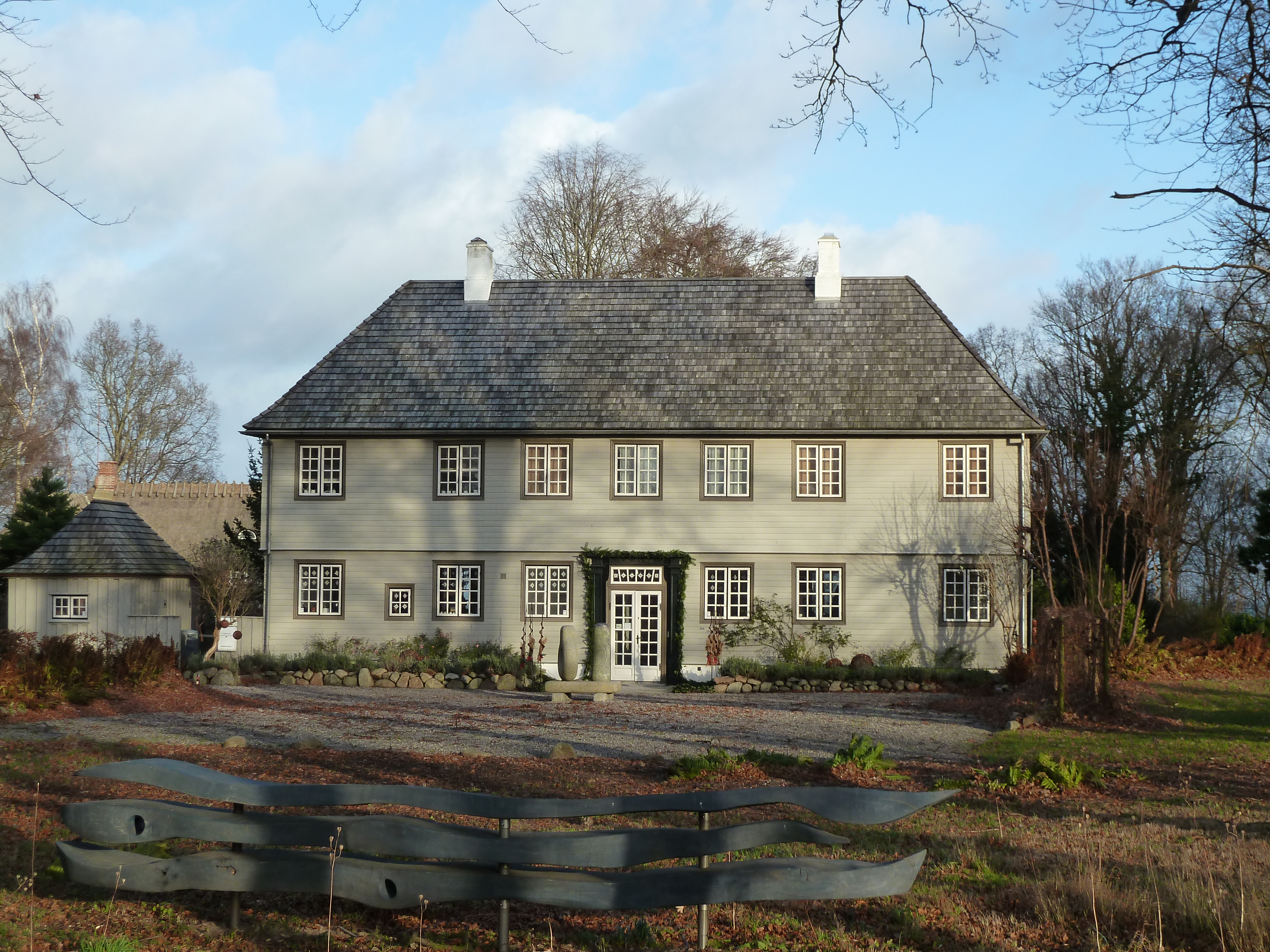
Munkeruphus

Dronningmølle water mill was rebuilt in the National Romantic style for Ferdinand Andersen and is now known as Dronningmølle Slot. The building has later been converted into holiday apartments. Ferdinand Andersen is also associated with other buildings in the area, such as the beach house Skansen which he constructed at the mouth of Esrum Å in 1899. The house takes its name after a protected defensive structure located on the estate. The now wingless wind mill next to the water mill was built in 1878 and remained in use until 1934. Dronningmølle Avlsgård from 1923 was designed by the architect Henning Hansen.

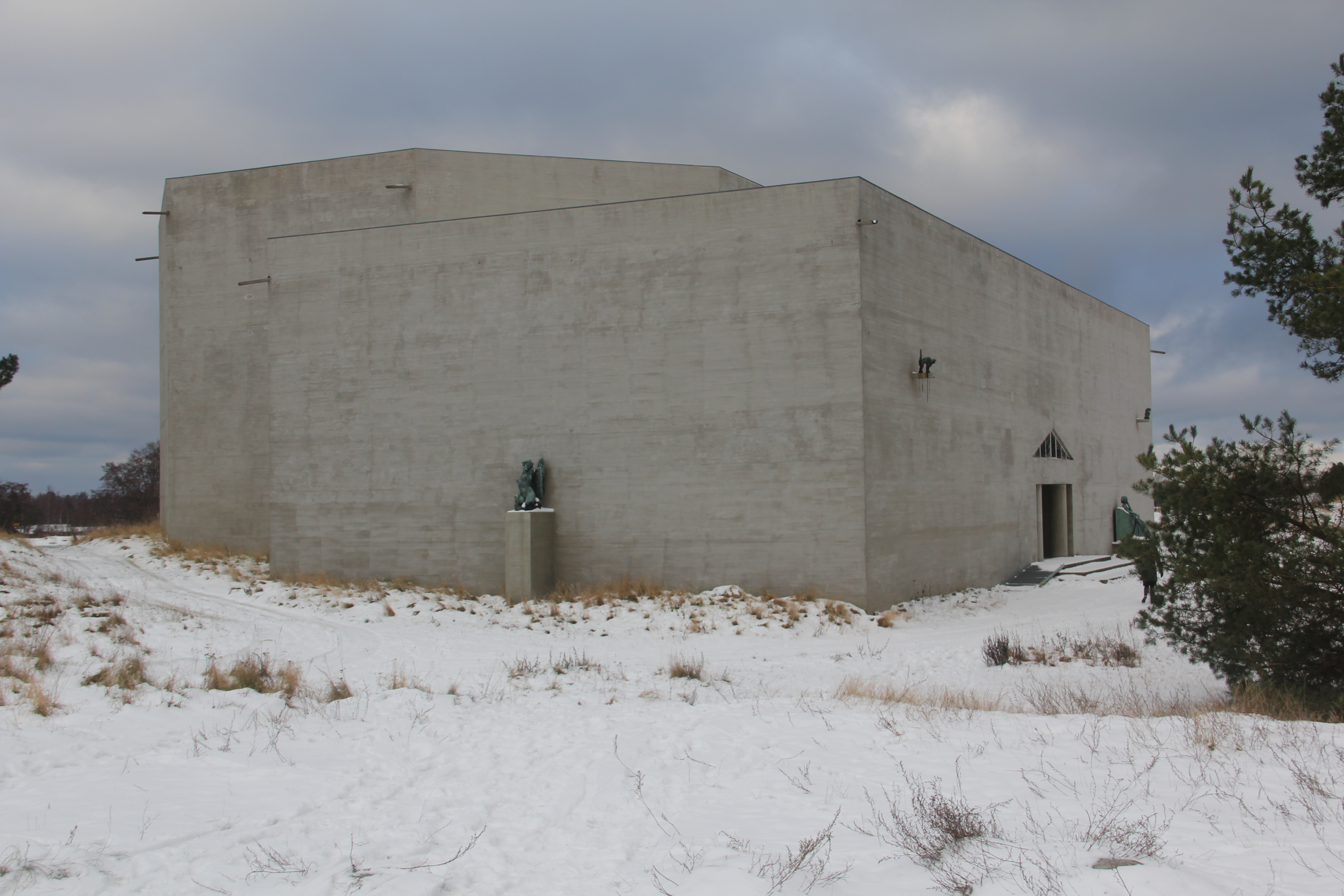
The Rudolph Tegner Museum

Munkeruphus (Munkerup House), a residence inspired by American Colonial Revival architecture, is located in Dronningmølle. It is now an exhibition centre.

The Rudolph Tegner Museum, just south of Dronningmølle, is dedicated to the work of the sculptor Rudolph Tegner who designed the building himself in a bunker-like Modernist style.

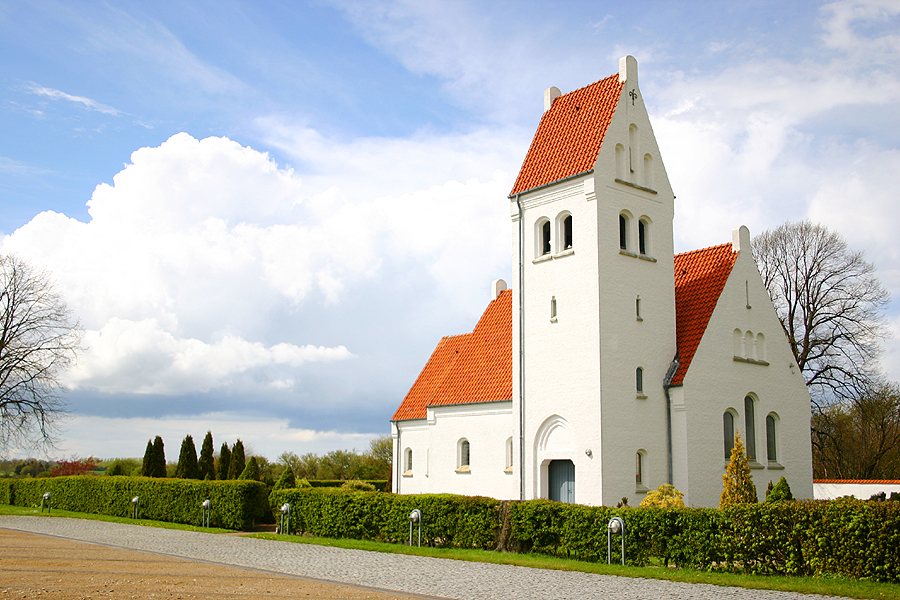
Villingerød Church

Villingerød Church, located on the west side of the road between Villingerød and Dronningmølle, close to the Rudolph Tegner Museum, is from 1906. It was designed by the architect Vilhelm Holck and is surrounded by a small graveyard.

== Notable residents ==
- Eli Benneweis, (Danish Wiki) (1911 - 1993 in Dronningmølle) owned Hulerød Avlsgård from 1939, using it as a winter residence for his Cirkus Benneweis.
- Svend Asmussen (1916 – 2017 in Dronningmølle) a Danish jazz violinist, known as The Fiddling Viking
- Helge Bronée (1922 – 1999 in Dronningmølle) a Danish footballer who played four games for the amateur Denmark national football team in 1945/6

== See also ==
- Tibirke
