= Firhøj railway station =

Railway station in North Zealand, Denmark

Firhøj
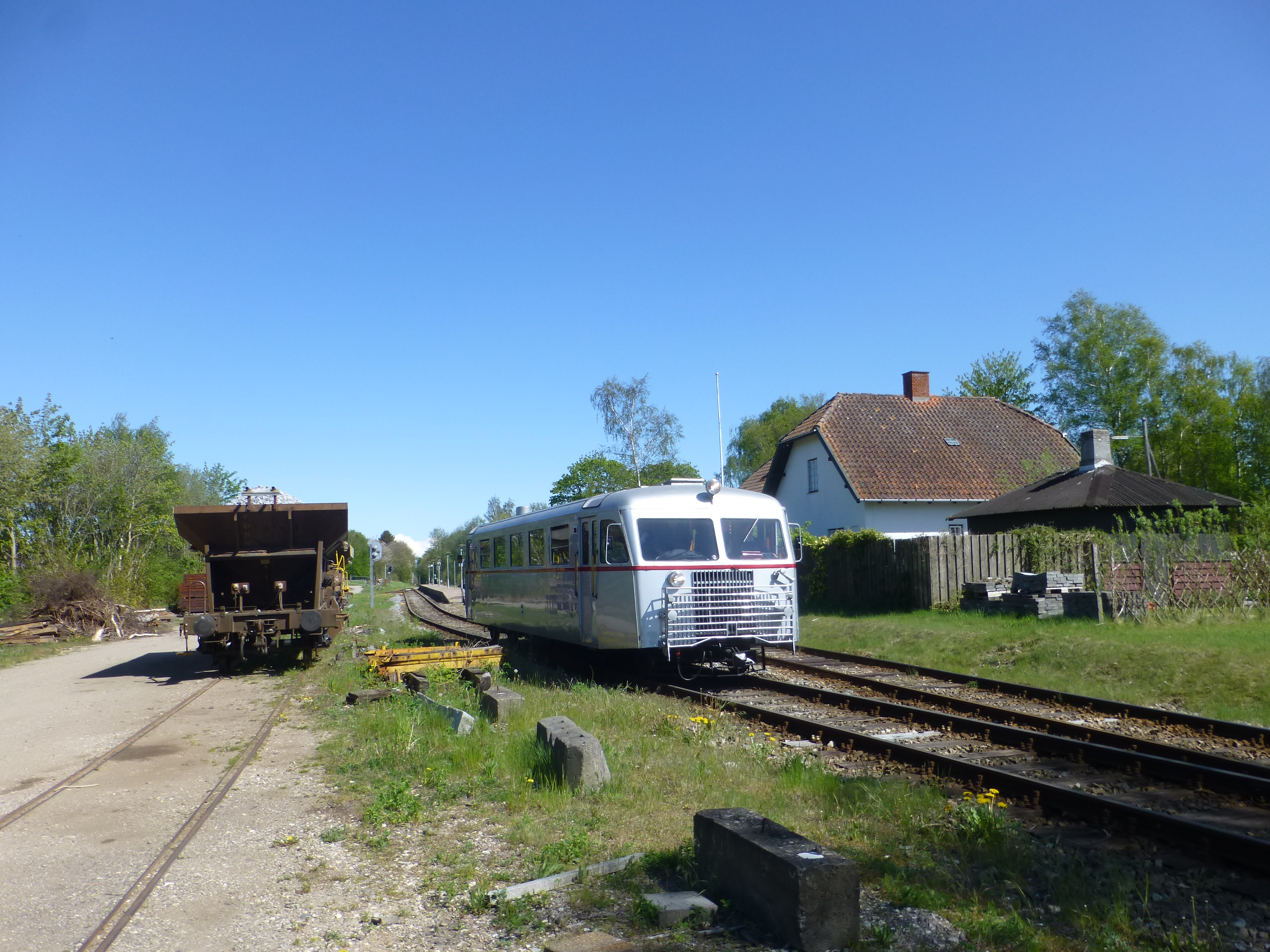
- The diesel railcar LNJ SM 13 at Firhøj Station in 2015 during a special trip with railway entusiasts.

General information
- Location: Firhøjvej 66; 3250 Gilleleje; Gribskov Municipality; Denmark
- Coordinates: 56°05′53.37″N 12°21′17.04″E
- Elevation: 17.8 metres (58 ft)
- Owner: Hovedstadens Lokalbaner
- Operator: Lokaltog
- Line: Hornbæk Line
- Platforms: 2
- Tracks: 2

History
- Opened: 10 July 1916

Services
Preceding station	Lokaltog	Following station
Dronningmølle towards Helsingør	Hornbæk Line Local train	Søborg towards Gilleleje
Location

Firhøj station is a railway station serving the settlements of Firhøj and Munkerup near Gilleleje in North Zealand, Denmark.

The station is located on the Hornbæk Line from Helsingør to Gilleleje. The train services are currently operated by the railway company Lokaltog which runs frequent local train services between Helsingør station and Gilleleje station.

== History ==
The station opened in 1916 as the Helsingør-Hornbæk railway line from Helsingør along the coast of the Øresund to Hornbæk was continued from Hornbæk station onwards along the coast to Gilleleje.

In 1997, two trains collided frontally in a head-on collision after one passed a red signal leaving Firhøj station. Both drivers were killed.

== See also ==
- List of railway stations in Denmark
