= Esrum Å =

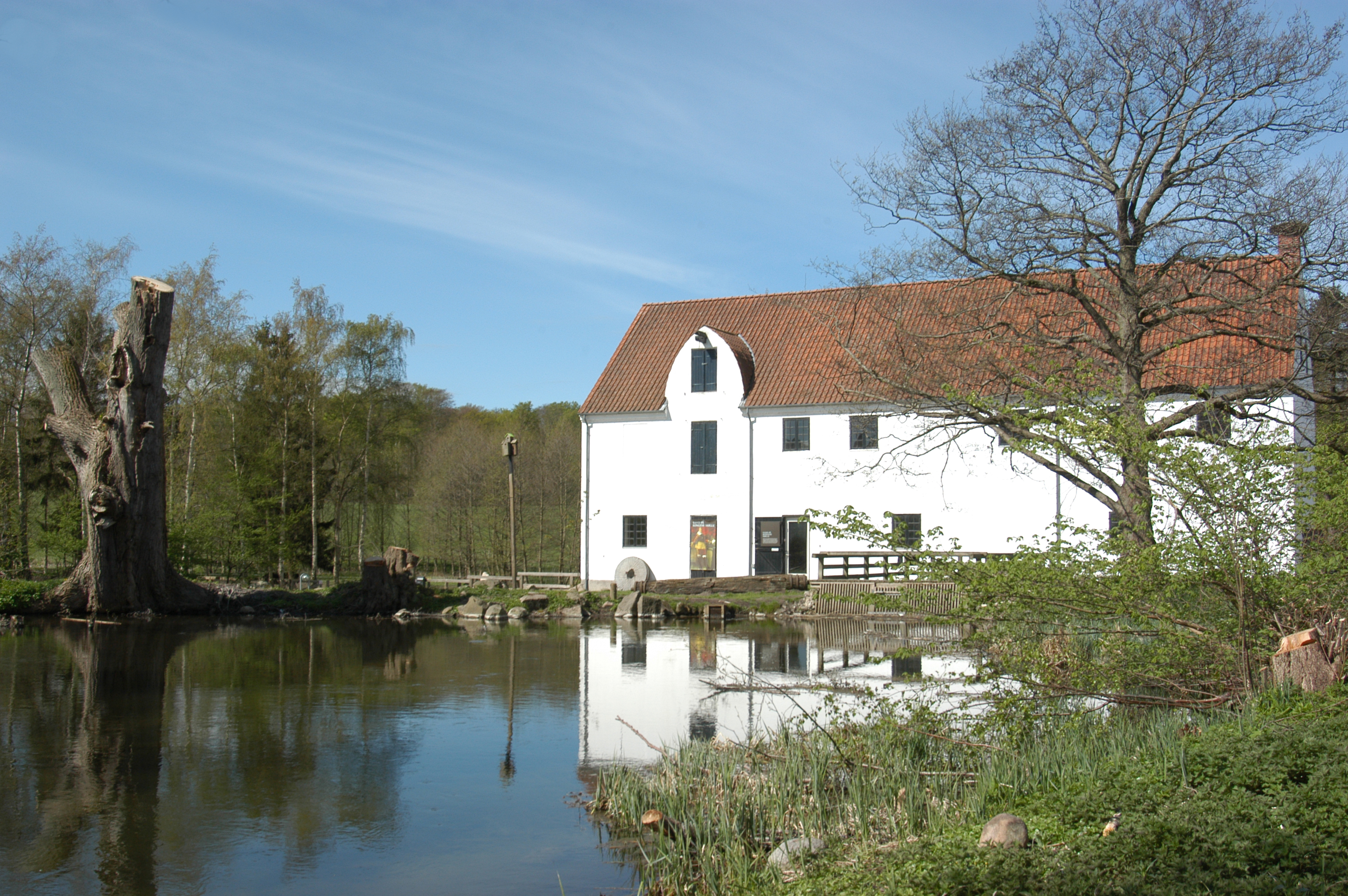
- Esrum Å at Esrum Watermill

Location
- Country: Denmark
- Region: Zealand
- District: Capital Region
- Municipality: Gribskov Municipality

Physical characteristics
- Source: Lake Esrum
  - location: Gribskov Municipality
  - coordinates: 56°02′11″N 12°22′50″E
  - elevation: 9.4 m (31 ft)
- Mouth: Hulerød, Dronningmølle
  - location: Kattegat
  - coordinates: 56°06′12″N 12°22′49″E
  - elevation: 0 m (0 ft)
- Length: 10 km (6.2 mi)

Esrum Å is the principal drainage of Lake Esrum, Denmark's second largest lake, located in Gribskov Municipality, some 50 km north of Copenhagen, Denmark. The 10-km-long stream extends from the northwestern part of the lake and flows past Esrum Watermill and Esrum Abbey on its way to The Kattegat at Dronningmølle.

Esrum Canal (Danish: Esrum Kanal) was built in about 1800 to facilitate the transportation of firewood from Gribskov to Copenhagen, offering a navigable alternative to the upper part of Rsrum Å. It remained in use until the 1870s but has now dried out.

== History ==
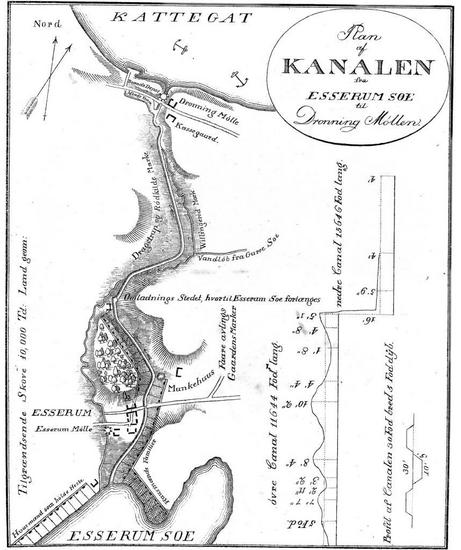
19th-century map showing Esrum river and canal

Esrum Watermill was probably built in the 12th century and belonged to Esrum Abbey until the Reformation when it was confiscated by the Crown. The upper part of the stream was regulated in the beginning of the 16th century at the initiative of Christian IV, probably to give the watermill more power.

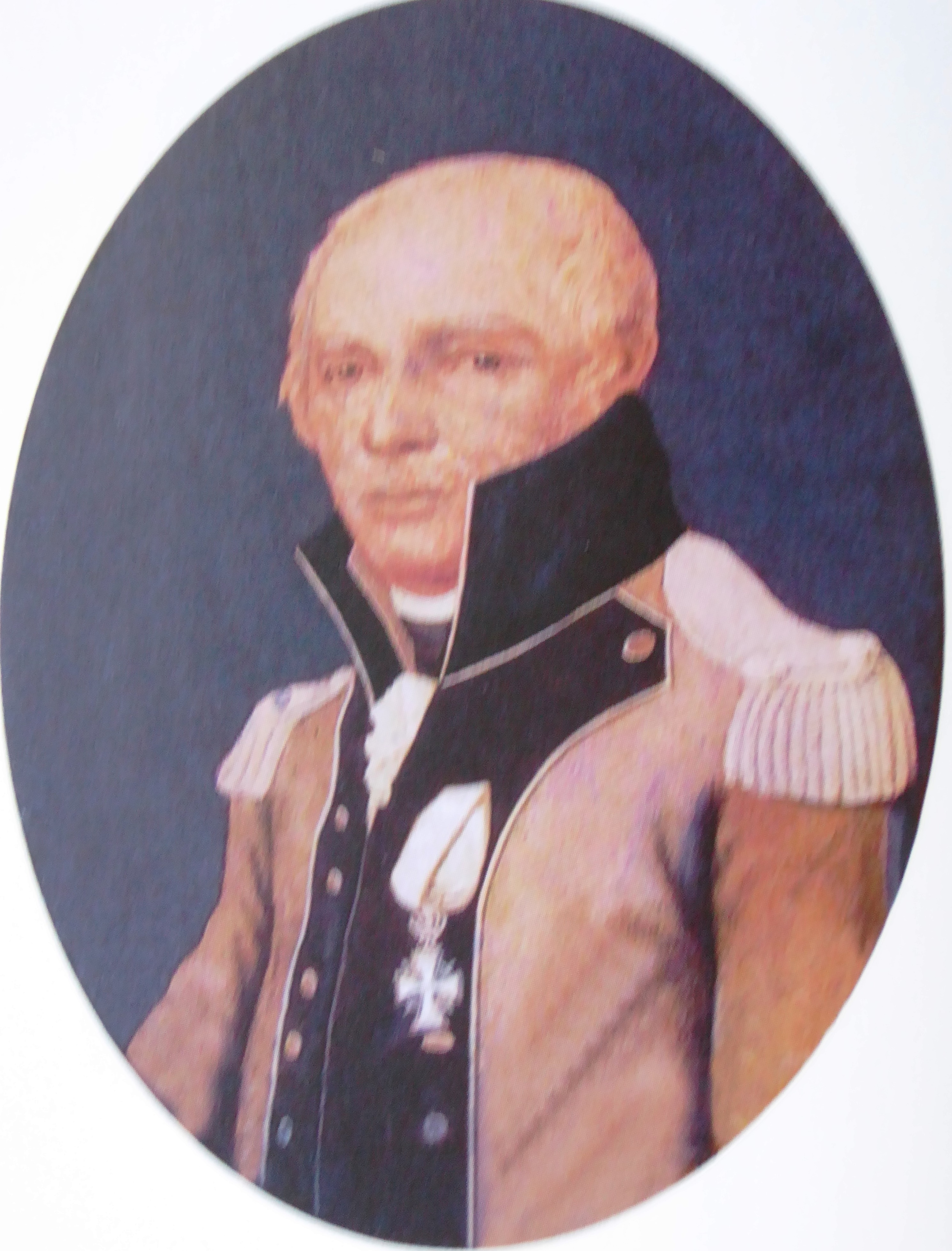
Adolph von der Recke

At the turn of the 19th century, the English Wars made it difficult to transport firewood from Norway which was still part of the Danish kingdom. To facilitate the transportation of firewood from Gribskov to Copenhagen, it was decided to construct a canal between Lake Esrum and the sea at Dronningmølle. The work was led by Adolph von der Recke and carried out by local peasants, soldiers and forced labour workers. Construction began in 1802 and the canal was completed in 1805.

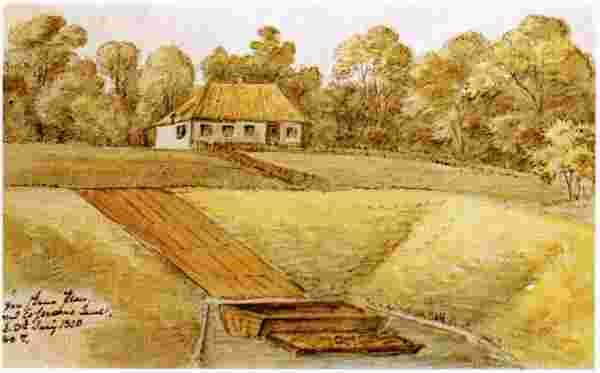
Væltningen as seen on a watercolour by O.J. Rawert from 1820

The canal was 9 km long, 9 m wide and 1.5 m deep. A towpath ran on the banks of the canal and on the western shores of lake Esrum. The timber had to pass a 4-metre crater-like ramp called Væltningen, which connected the upper section of the canal to its lower part. In Dronningmølle, the firewood was loaded onto large cargo ships and sailed to Copenhagen.

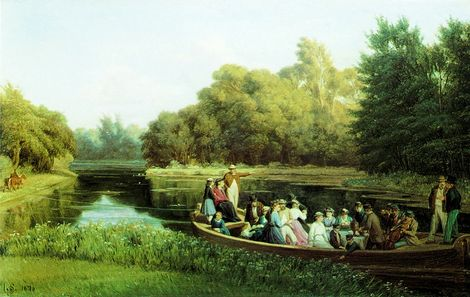
"The Puggård family sailing on Esrum Canal" painting by Jørgen V. Sonne (c. 1890)

The upper part of the canal passed two ponds. One of them, Storedam (Great Pond), was the site of a watermill which was first used as backup for the gunpowder mill in Frederiksværk during the English Wars and later for the manufacturing of textiles for the army. Transportation of firewood on the canal continued until 1874 and it was later used for leisure trips. It has now dried out and been covered by forest, but Væltningen and other elements are still visible in the landscape.

== Ecology ==
Characteristic plant species include large bittercress (Cardamine amara), marsh-marigold (Caltha palustris) and yellow iris.

== See also ==
- Mølleåen
