= Munkeruphus =

Former country house in Munkerup, Zealand, Denmark

Munkerup House
- Munkeruphus
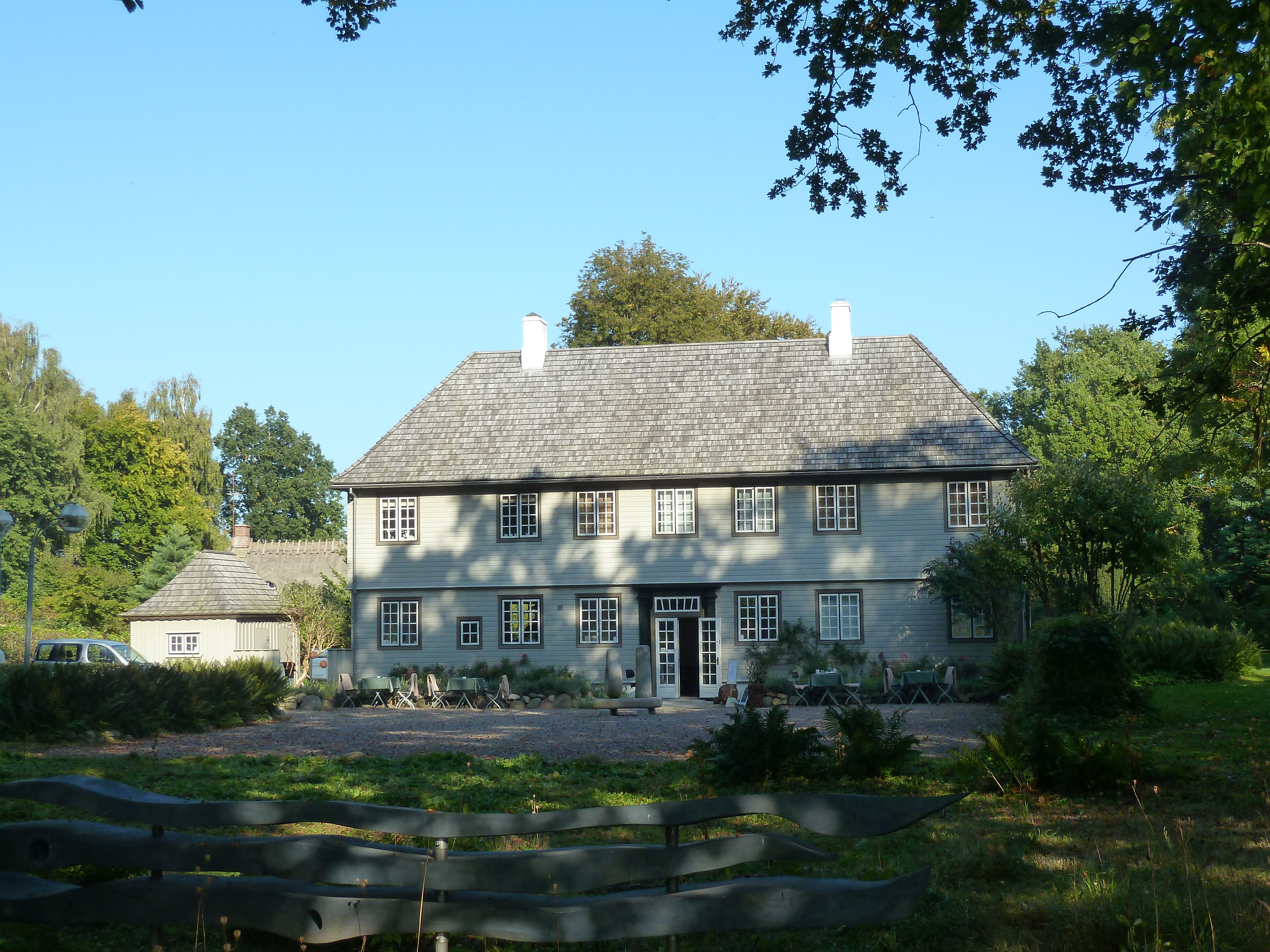
- Main façade of the Munkerup House
- Interactive map of the Munkerup House area

General information
- Architectural style: Colonial Revival
- Location: Dronningmølle, Denmark, Denmark
- Coordinates: 56°6′34.21″N 12°21′55.75″E
- Completed: 1916

Design and construction
- Architects: Terkel Hjejle and Niels Rosenkjær

Munkeruphus (literally "Munkerup House") is a former country house located in Munkerup now part of Dronningmølle–Hornbæk, on the north coast of Zealand, Denmark. A rare example of American influence in Danish architecture, the building now serves as an exhibition space.

== History ==
Munkeruphus was built in 1916 for civil engineer Frederik Raaschou and his family by the two young architects Terkel Hjejle and Niels Rosenkjær.

In 1958 it was acquired by artist and designer Gunnar Aagaard Andersen and his wife. Aagaard had previously lived in France from 1946 to 1951 where he had co-founded Groupe Espace, a collaborative between artists and architects who worked with spatial art, and he made it the centre of an active artistic environment with many visiting colegees visiting from abroad.

In 1986 it was purchased by the Capital Region Authority and subsequently listed by the Danish Heritage Agency. For a few years it was left empty but in the autumn of 1988 it was ceded to a foundation with the aim of transforming it into an exhibition space for changing exhibitions. It was renovated with support from private benefactors and opened the doors to its first exhibition on 26 August 1989.

== Architecture ==
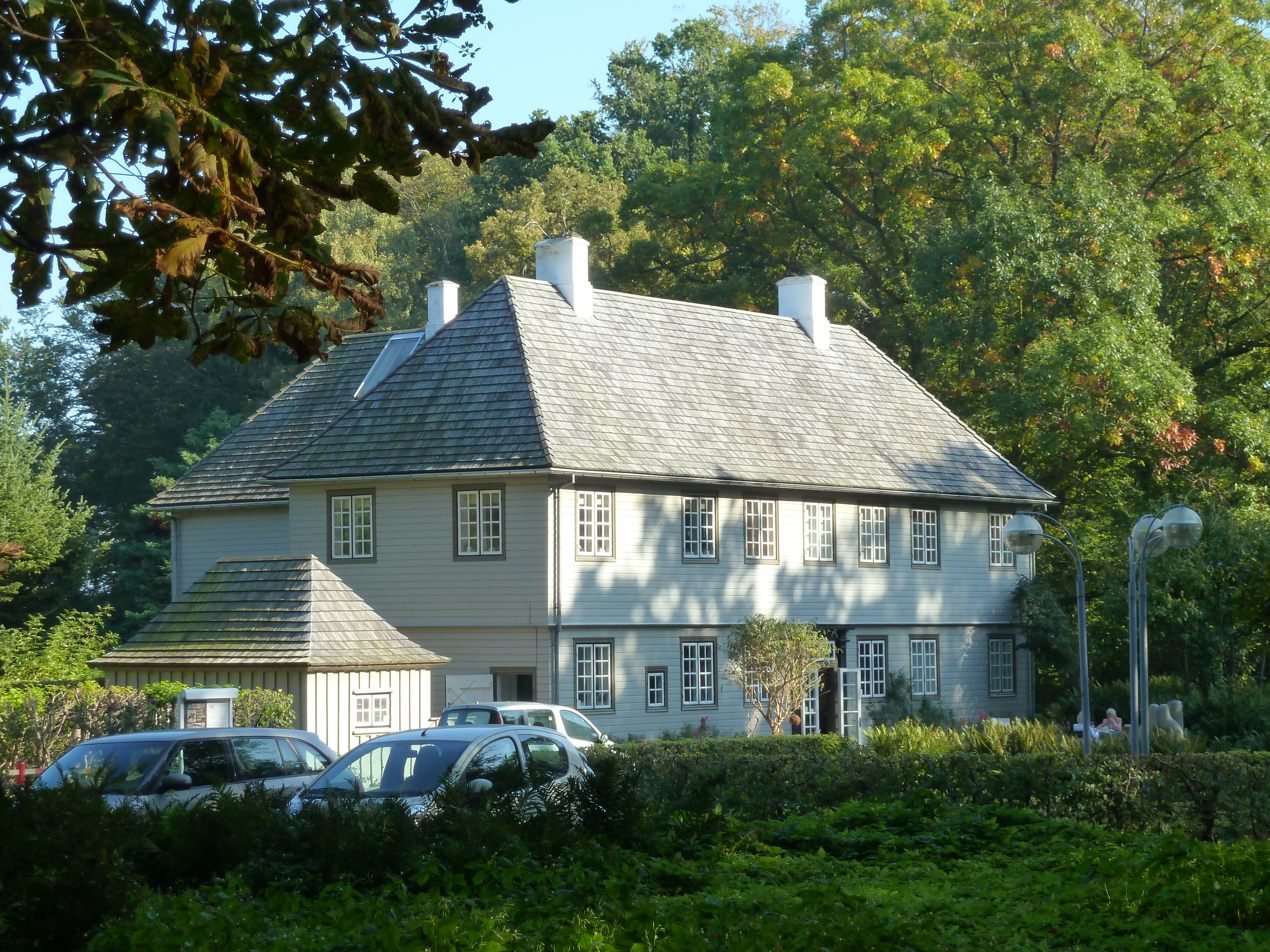
The house viewed from the west

Munkeruphus was designed with inspiration from the Arts and Crafts Movement and American Colonial Revival architecture. It is a two-story, T-shaped structure with a horizontal board siding, topped by a shingled hip roof. The almost symmetrical main facade is nine bays long but the second window from each side and on both floors is omitted, save in the ground floor of the left hand side where a smaller window creates a small deviation from the dominating symmetry of the facade. The main entrance is through a double-leafed French door with a glass transom. On the north (rear) side, another wing has been designed to optimize views of the sea.

== Park ==
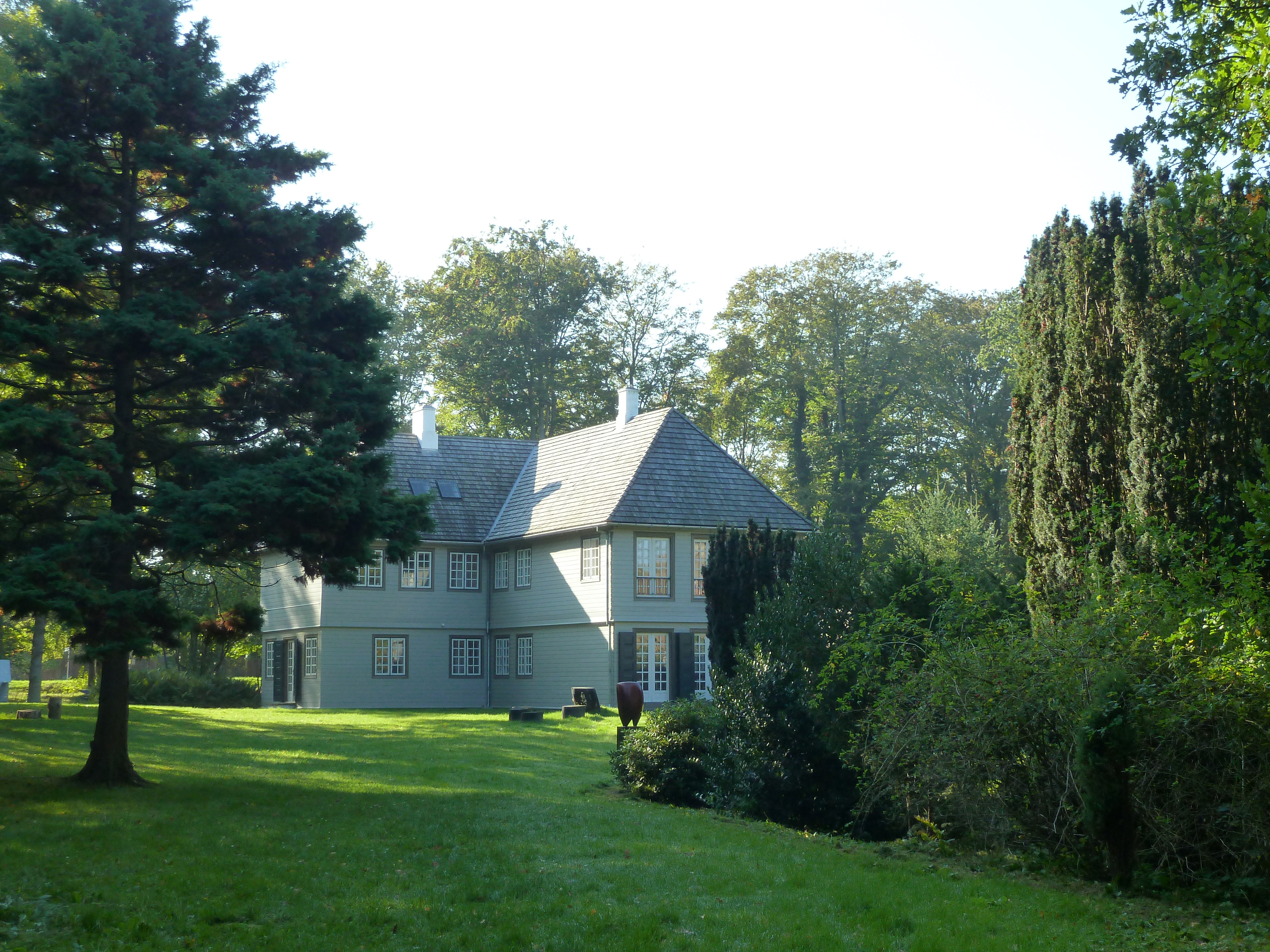
The house viewed from the garden

Set back from the coastal road between Hornbæk and Gilleleje, at the end of an unpaved driveway, the house is on a 16-hectare lot which consists of parkland with lawns, winding paths and many mature trees. The rear slopes reach all the way to the sandy beaches along the Øresund and the park affords views of Nakkehoved and Hornbæk along the coast as well as Sweden on the other side of the water. There are also a number of outdoor sculptures on the premises.

== Munkeruphus today ==
Munkeruphus is operated as a self-owning institution. It plays host to 5–6 exhibitions a year about art, crafts, design, architecture or other themes. It also serves as a venue for lectures and indoor as well as outdoor concerts. There is also a café which serves light lunch meals, cakes and hot and cold drinks in the ground floor of the rear wing.

== See also ==
- Rudolph Tegner Museum
