= Gunnar Aagaard Andersen =

Danish painter and sculptor (1919–1982)

Gunnar Aagaard Andersen (14 July 1919 – 29 June 1982) was a Danish sculptor, painter, designer and architect whose work belongs to the Concrete art movement.

== Early life and education ==
Born in Ordrup to the north of Copenhagen, Aagaard Andersen attended the Arts and Crafts School (Kunsthåndværkersole) from 1936 to 1939. Between 1940 and 1946, he studied at the Royal Danish Academy of Fine Arts under Aksel Jørgensen and Gunnar Biilmann Petersen. He also spent a short period studying etching at the Royal Swedish Academy of Arts. From 1946 to 1950, he studied in Paris under the sculptor Ossip Zadkine, after which he travelled to Italy (1951) and England (1952–53).

== Career ==
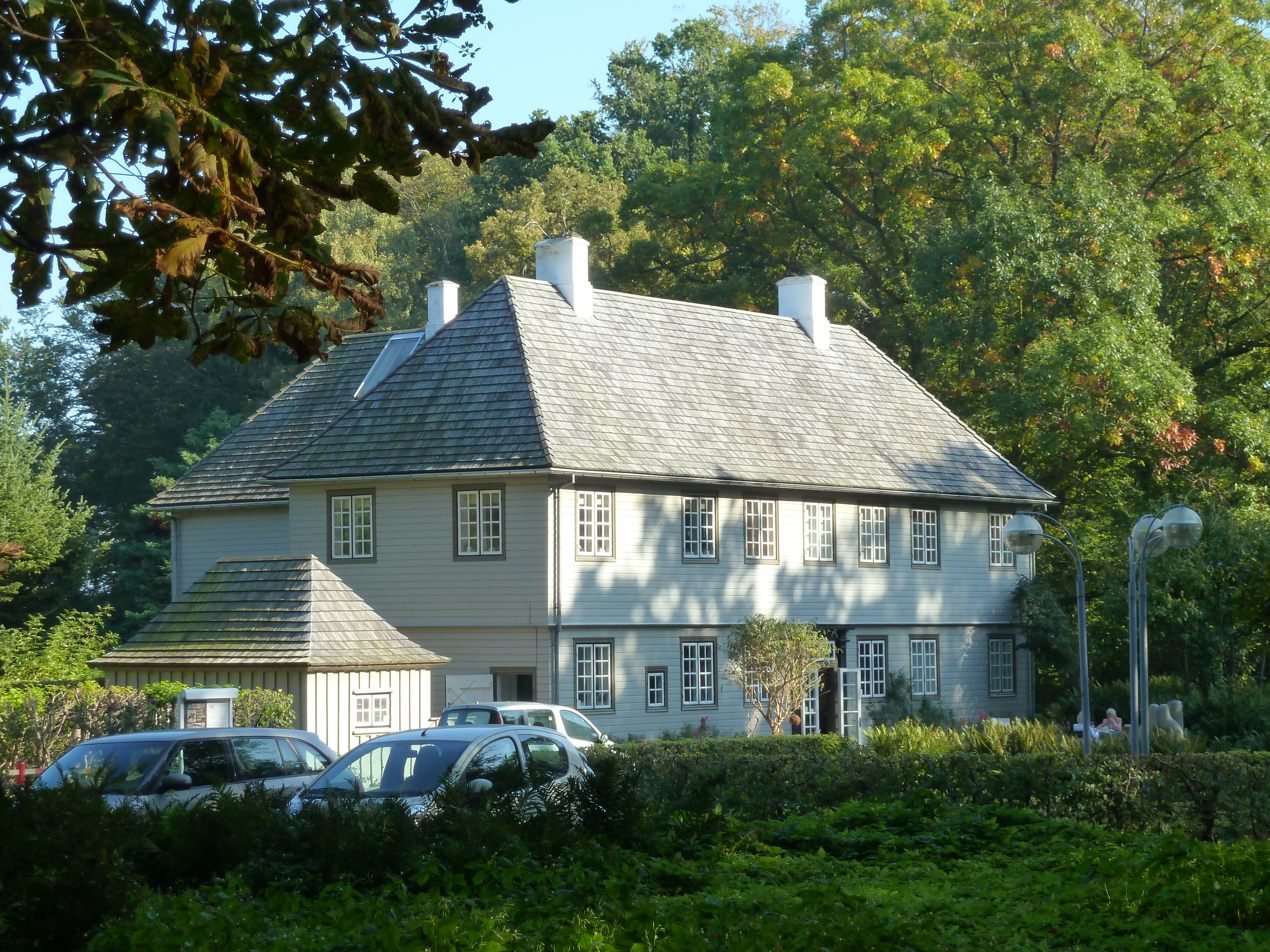
Munkeruphus, Aagaard Andersen's home from 1958 until his death

Aagaard Andersen first exhibited at the Kunstnernes Efterårsudstilling (Artists Autumn Exhibition) in 1937. Initially he created mainly drawings and sketches but he also painted. In the 1940s, he illustrated a number of books in a Realist style but while he was in Paris, he was inspired to paint Concrete art works. He was one of the founders of the Linien II artists association (1948–52), ensuring a working relationship between new trends in French art and developments in Denmark. In France, he joined the newly formed concrete art association Groupe Espace which brought together architects, sculptors, engineers and painters who collaborated on creating works in the open air. Aagaard Andersen was one of 45 participants in the large outdoor exhibition they presented in Biot, Alpes-Maritimes in 1954.

In the 1950s, he created architectural designs integrated with decorative works for the textile firm Mads Eg Damgaard in Herning, giving him an opportunity to demonstrate his understanding of integrated art. During the same period, he produced carpets and textiles in collaboration with Unika Vaev. He was also active as a designer, producing a polyester chair in 1964 which is now exhibited in New York's Museum of Modern Art, MoMA. His most comprehensive achievement in decoration was for the Odense Concert Hall in 1983.

From 1972 to 1982, Aagaard Andersen was a professor at the Royal Danish Academy of Fine Arts.

He died in Munkerup on 29 June 1982.

Aagaar Andersen has exhibited widely both in Denmark and abroad. There was a large exhibition of his work in 2013 at Den Frie Udstilling in Copenhagen.

== Awards ==
In 1977, Aagaard Andersen was awarded the Eckersberg Medal and, in 1980, the Thorvaldsen Medal.

== Exhibitions ==
- Aagaard Andersen i brug, Den Frie Udstilling, Copenhagen (17 August –16 October 2013)
