= Skipperhuset =

Coordinates: 55.9804°N 12.3818°E

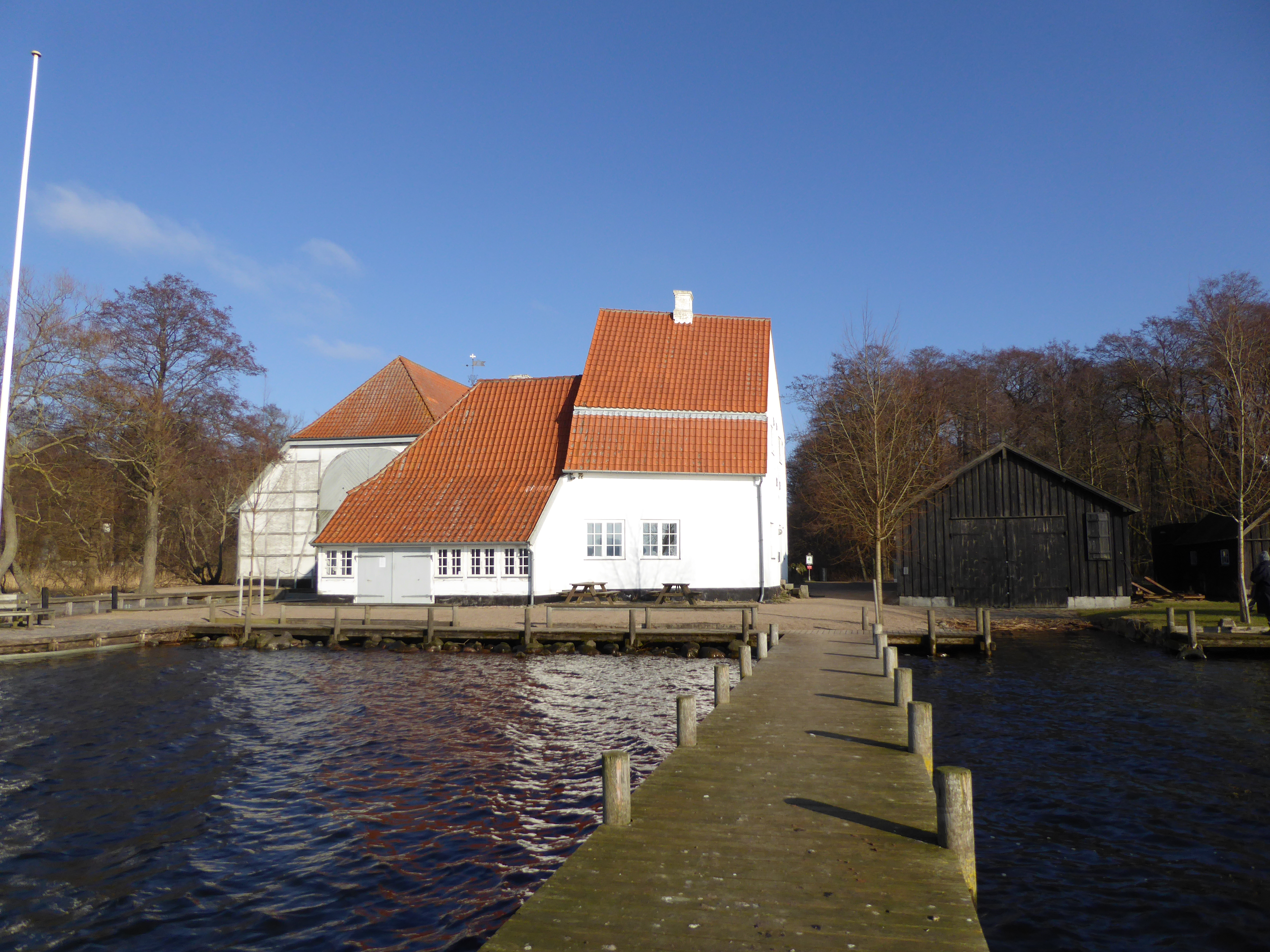
The Skipperhuset buildings viewed from the jetty

Skipperhuset refers to a small cluster of historic buildings including an 18th-century former royal boathouse located in Fredensborg Palace gardens on the southeastern shoreline of Lake Esrum at Fredensborg, Denmark. The buildings are now home to the Lake Esrum Boat Service and a restaurant.

== History ==
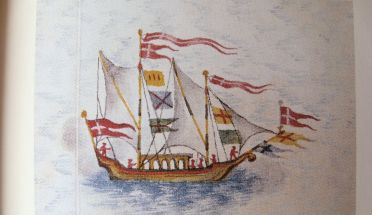
Frederick IV's leisure boat, hand-coloured drawing from Frederick IV's Atlas, 1859

Frederick IV's new Fredensborg Palace was completed in 1722. In 1725, he ordered a boat for use on Lake Esrum from the Royal Shipyard at Nyholm in Copenhagen. The assignment was personally handled by the shipyard's director Admiral Ole Judichær who designed the flat-bottomed boat in the style of a diminutive naval ship. It had two masts, was 15 metres long (23 Danish ells, 1 Danish ell = 63 cm), 3.5 m wide (six ells) and lavishly decorated with flags, pennons and small canons. The king's cabin was six and a half metres long (10 ells), had glazed sides and a royal purple-coloured textile canopy with the king's monogram in silver. The crew consisted of a naval lieutenant responsible for navigating the ship and eight rowers. The boathouse was built in 1725–26 to a design by Johan Cornelius Krieger who had also designed the palace.

Frederick IV's boat was decommissioned in 1790 but was succeeded by other vessels. In 1866, the complex was converted into a washhouse. The royal laundry had previously been done in Copenhagen but the water in Lake Esrum had a very low content of iron and therefore resulted in less discolouring of white clothes and linen. The washhouse closed in 1954 and the buildings were then used as a storage until 1990-93 when they were renovated by the Agency for Palaces and Cultural Properties.

== Buildings ==
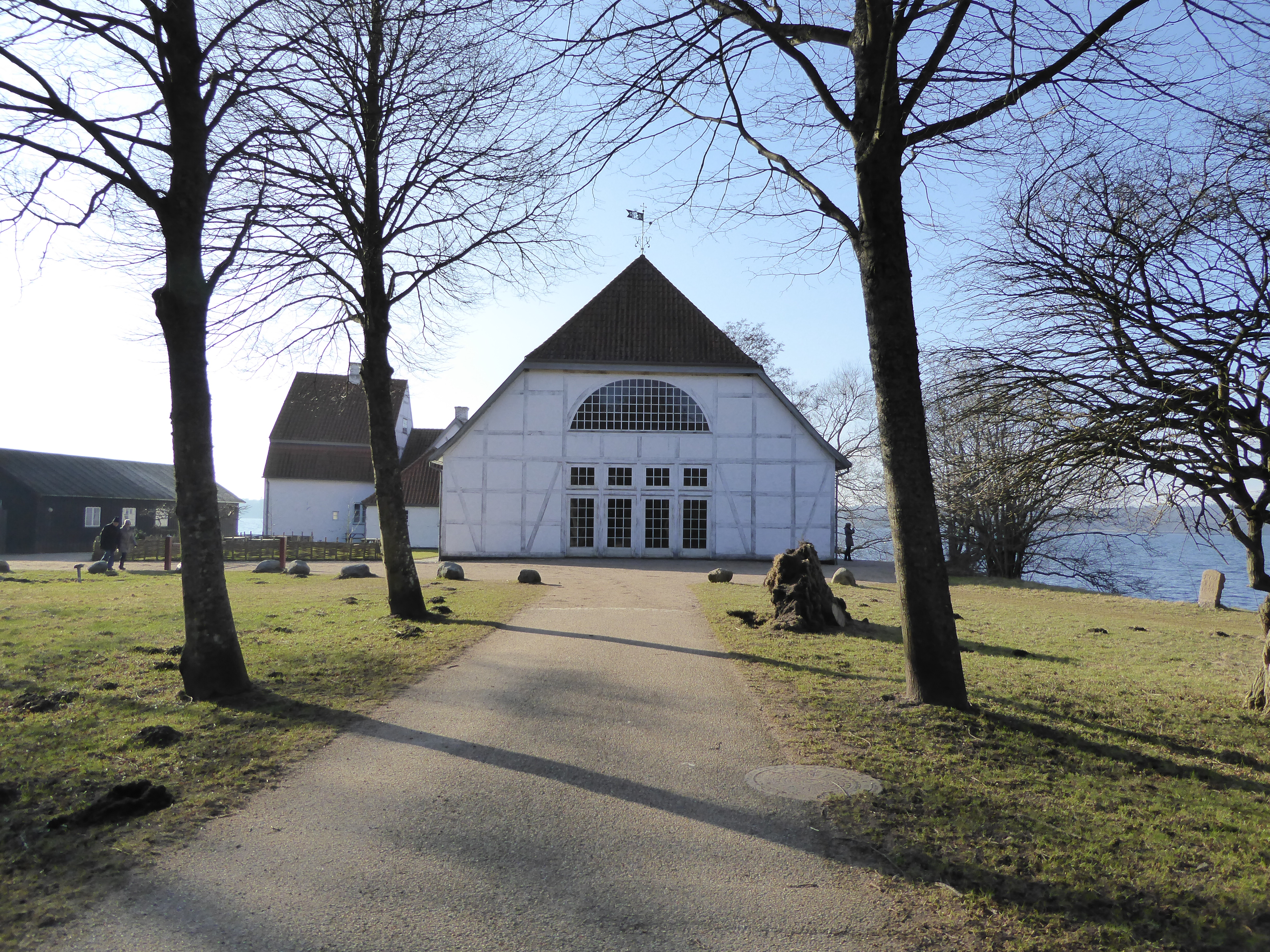
The boathouse

The boathouse is individually referred to as Chaluphuset (the Shaloop House"). The building has timber framing and a half hipped tile roof. The gate facing the water is six metres wide and was tall enough for the royal yacht to enter the building without lowering its two masts. A m identical gate in the opposite gable was built upon specific orders from Frederick IV since he enjoyed the view through the building when arriving at the site. The Chaluphuset building was heritage listed in 1918.

The site also includes a tall narrow building, colloquially known as Det Skæve Tårn ("The Leaning Tower"), which is the former residence for the navigator of the royal yacht. A small building at its rear, variously referred to as Beghuset ("The Pitch House) or Tjærehuset ("The Pitch House"), was used for the preparation of pitch and tar for the ships.

== Use ==
Bådfarten Esrum Sø operates boat trips on the lake from the premises.

Restaurant Skipperhuset is open all year around for both for lunch (11.30 -16.00) and dinner (18.00 - 21.00). The premises are also used for exhibitions and can be booked by parties and for other events.

== Image gallery ==
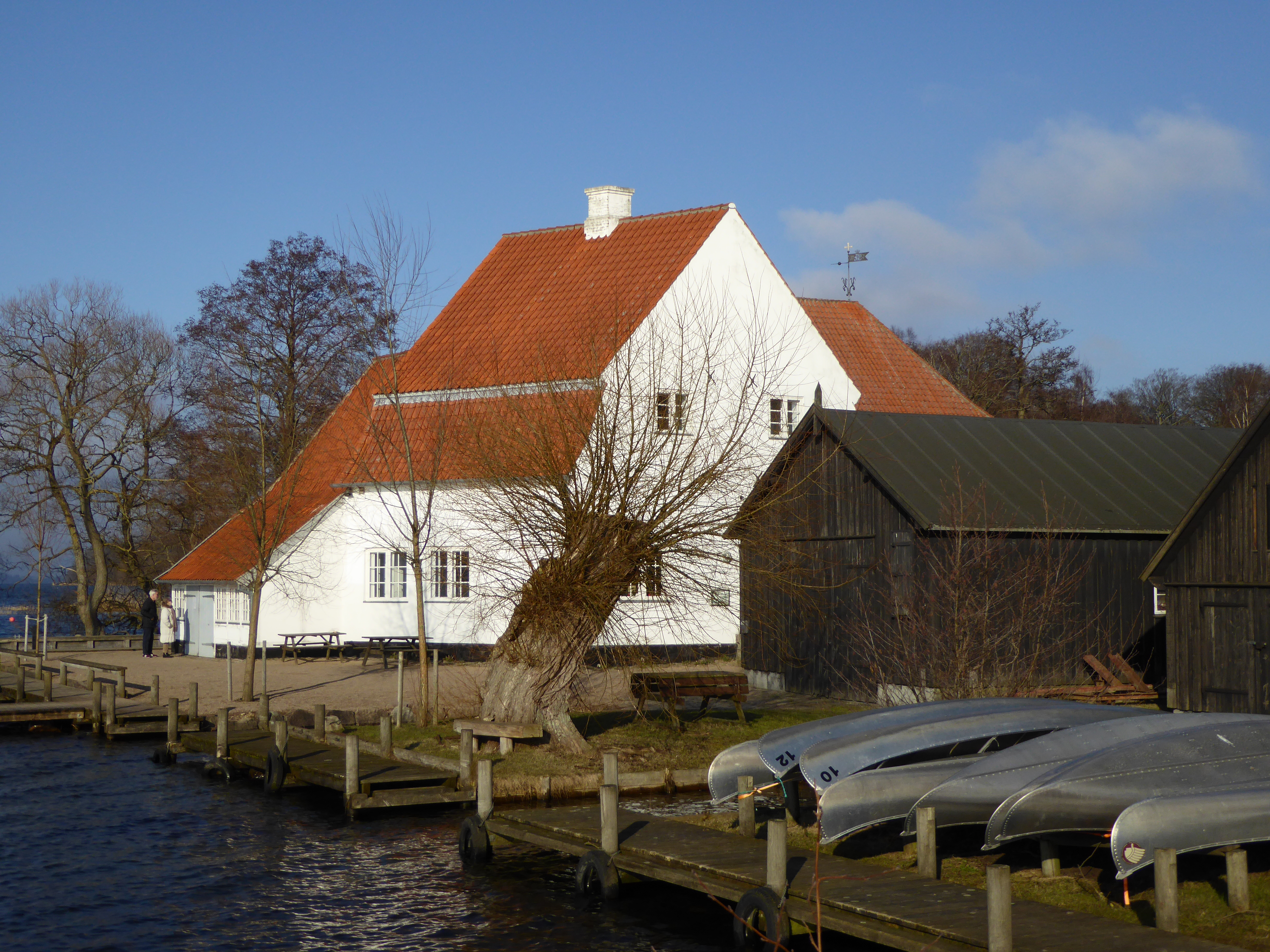

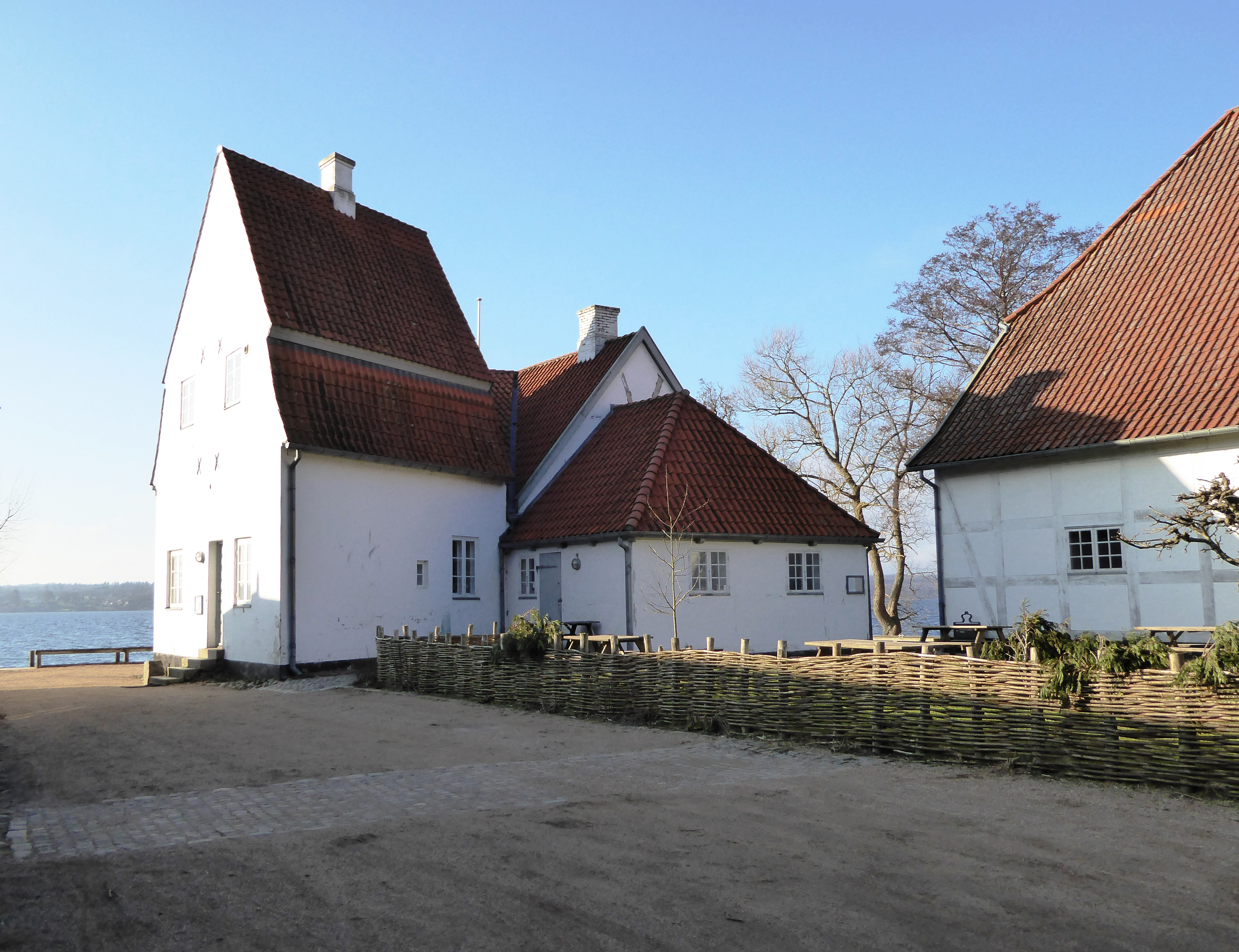

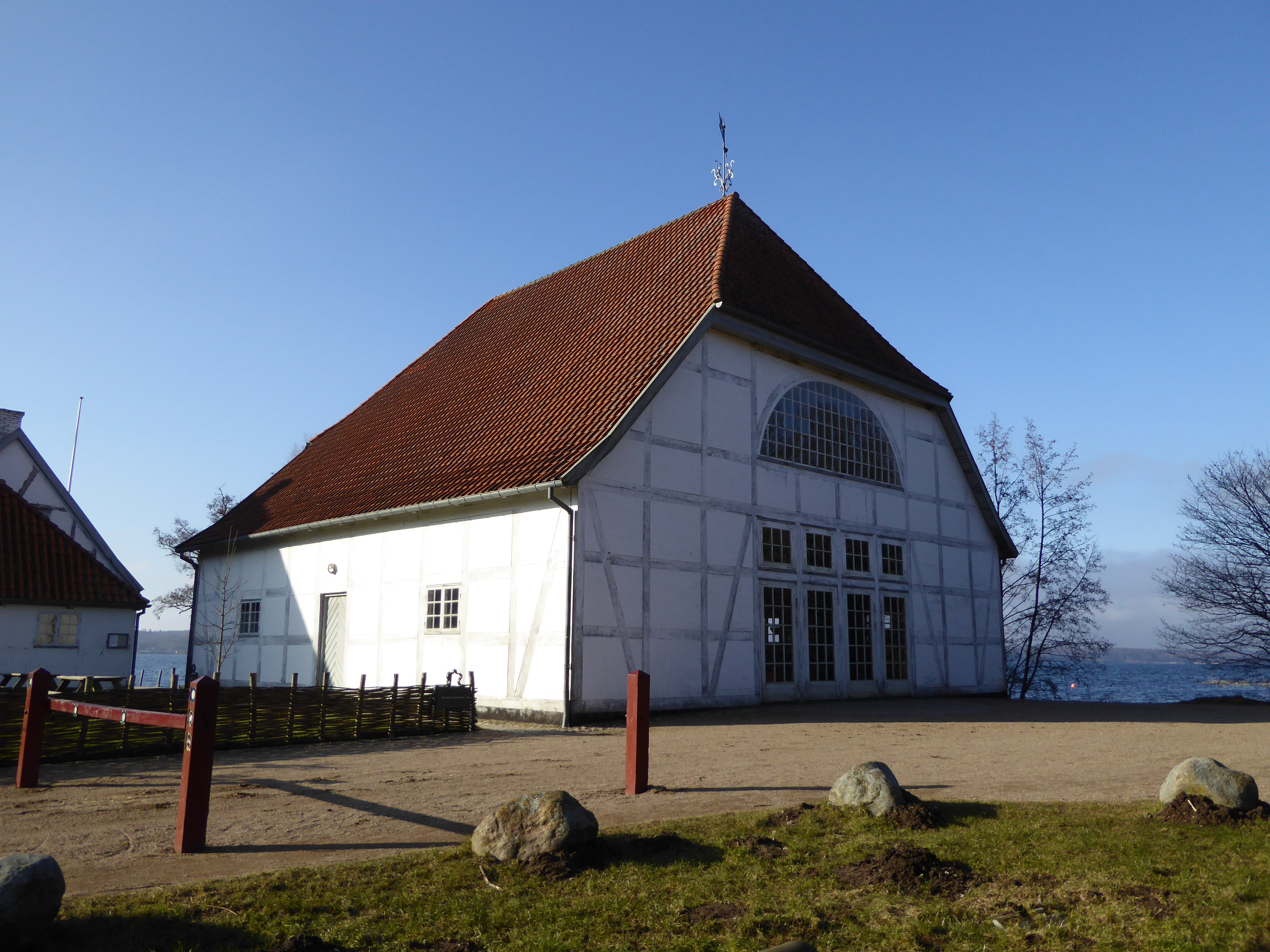

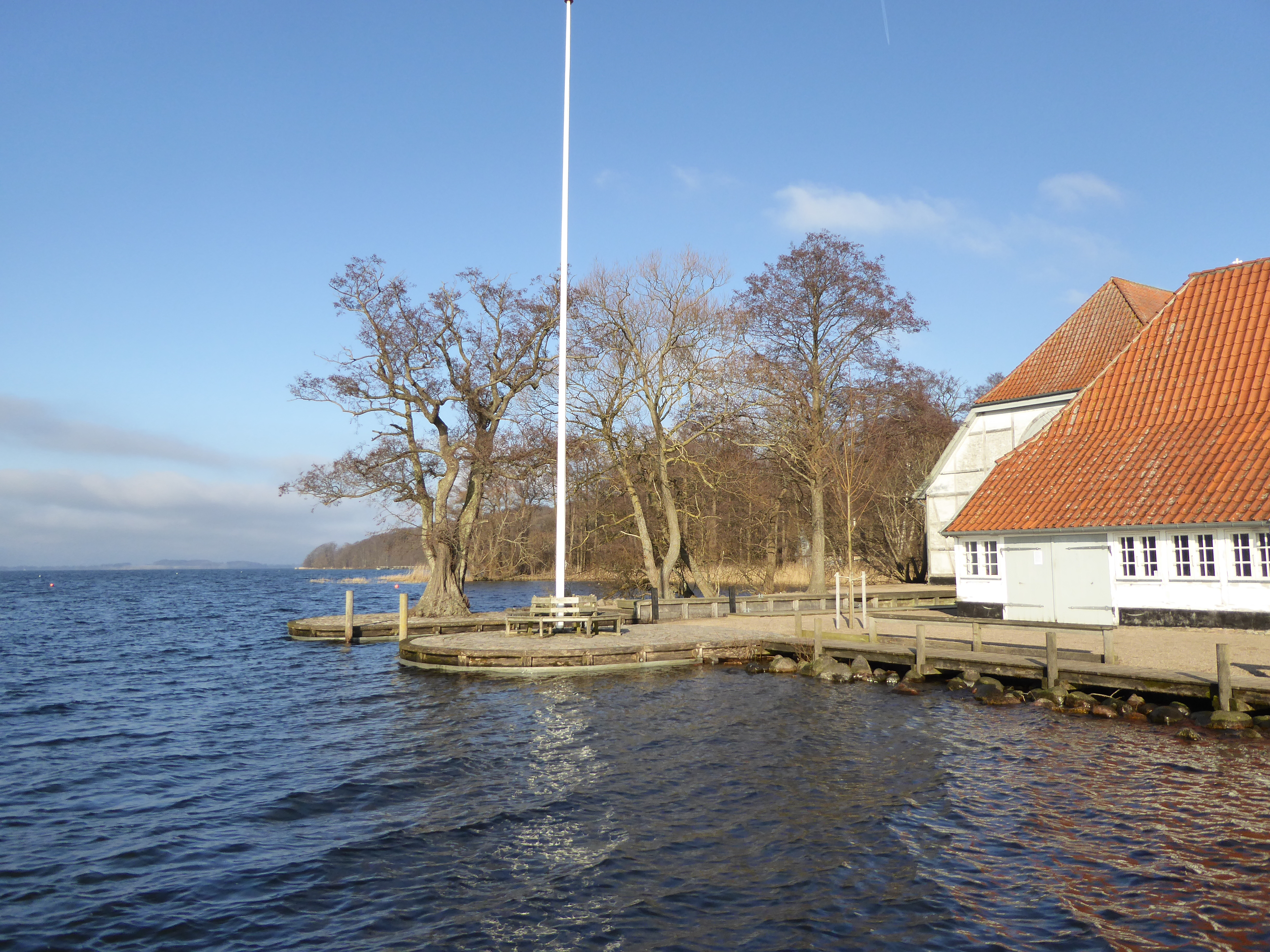
