= Dronningmølle railway station =

Railway station in North Zealand, Denmark

Dronningmølle
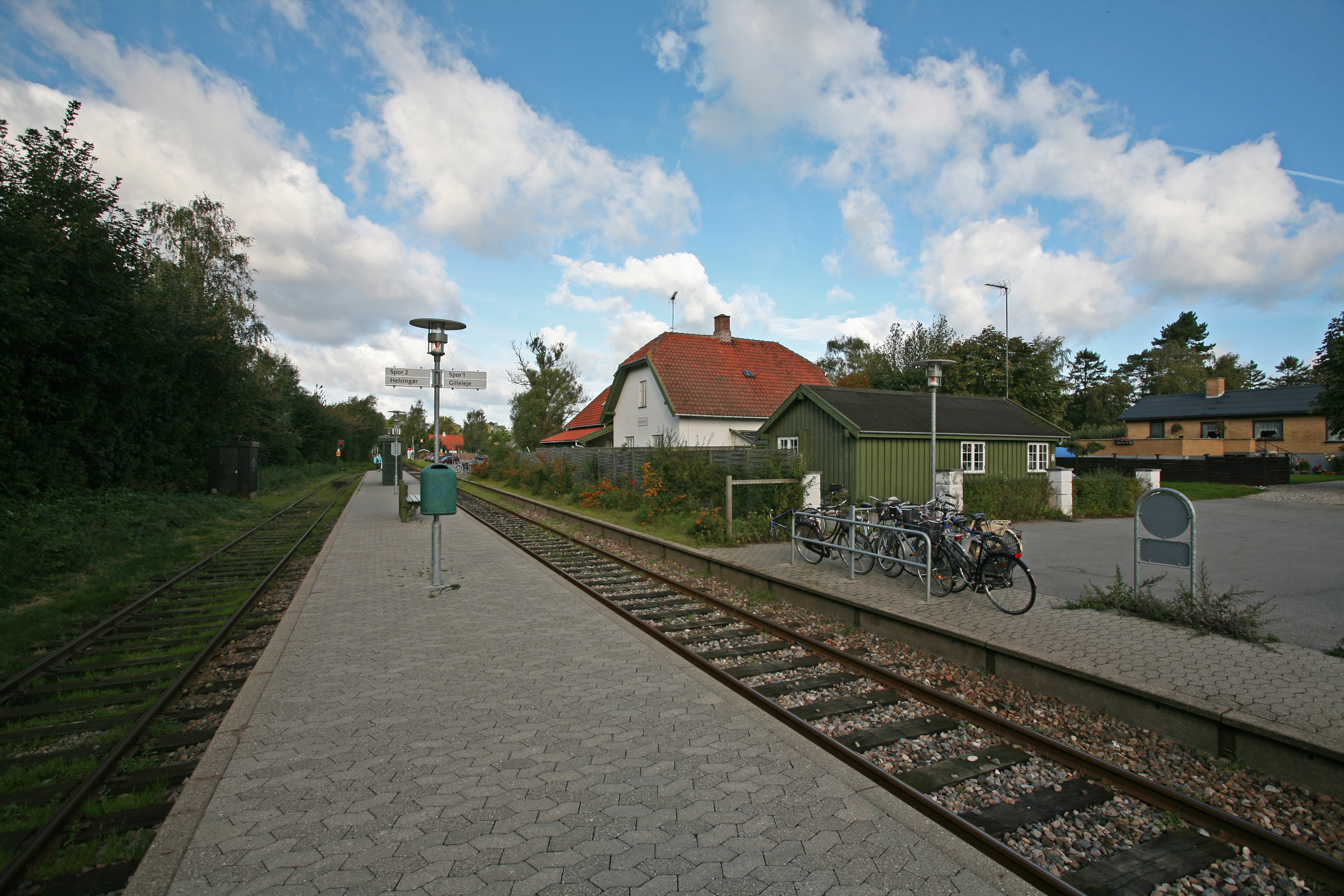
- Dronningmølle station in 2007

General information
- Location: Dronningmølle Stationsvej 6; 3120 Dronningmølle; Gribskov Municipality; Denmark
- Coordinates: 56°05′52.11″N 12°23′15.07″E
- Elevation: 9.3 metres (31 ft)
- Owner: Hovedstadens Lokalbaner
- Operator: Lokaltog
- Line: Hornbæk Line
- Platforms: 2
- Tracks: 2

History
- Opened: 1916

Services
Preceding station	Lokaltog	Following station
Kildekrog towards Helsingør	Hornbæk Line Local train	Firhøj towards Gilleleje
Location

Dronningmølle station ((Danish pronunciation: [tʁʌne̝ŋˈmølə stæˈɕoˀn])) is a railway station serving the seaside resort town of Dronningmølle on the north coast of Zealand, Denmark.

The station is located on the Hornbæk Line from Helsingør to Gilleleje. The train services are currently operated by the railway company Lokaltog which runs frequent local train services between Helsingør station and Gilleleje station.

== History ==
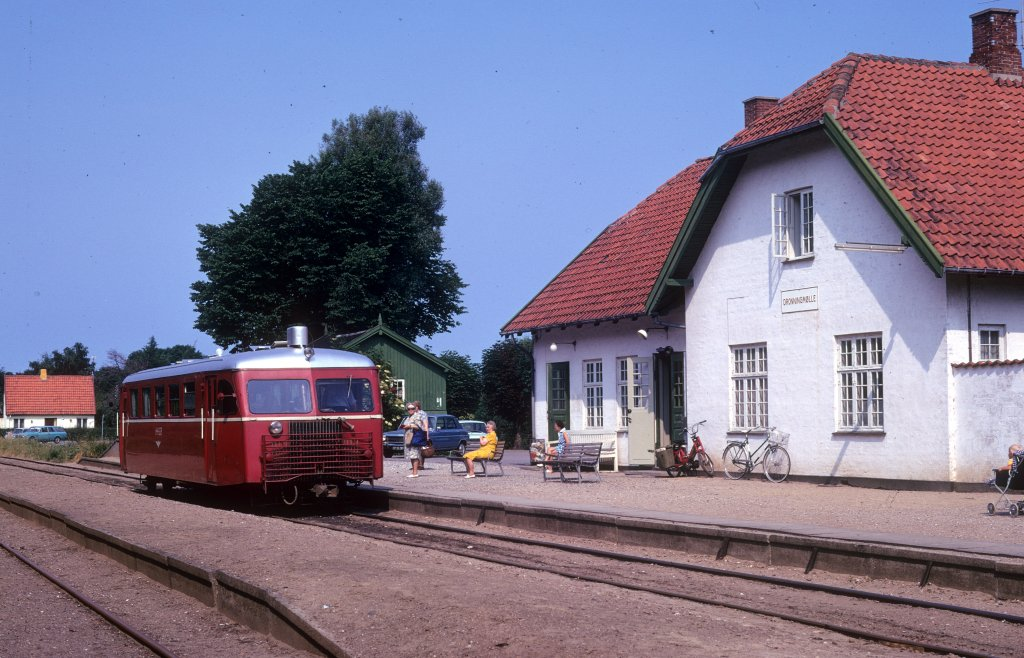
Railcar at the station in 1973

The station opened in 1916 as the Helsingør-Hornbæk railway line from Helsingør along the coast of the Øresund to Hornbæk was continued from Hornbæk station onwards along the coast to Gilleleje.

== Cultural references ==
Dronningmølle station is used as a location in the 1965 Danish sex comedy film Eric Soya's "17".

== See also ==
- List of railway stations in Denmark
- Rail transport in Denmark
