= Lake Esrum =

Lake in Denmark

- Esrum Sø (Danish)
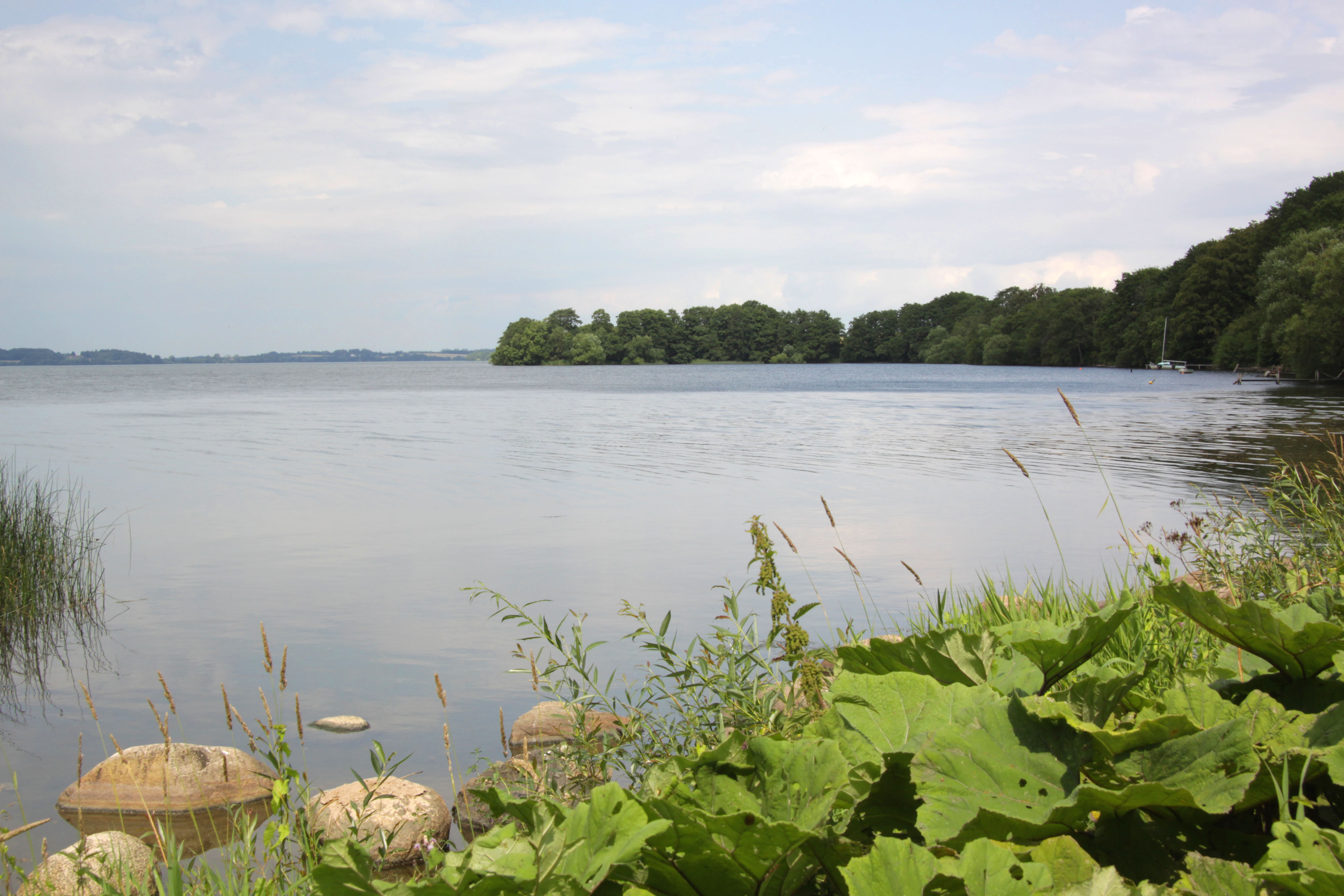
- Lake Esrum

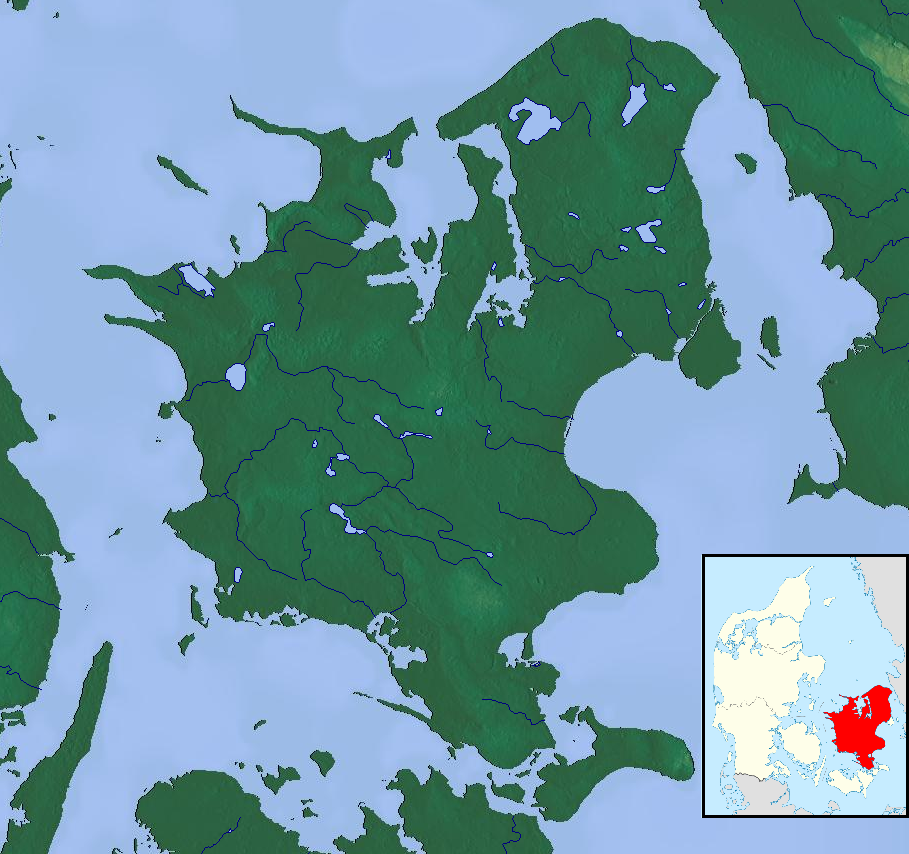
- Location within Zealand Location within Denmark
- Location: Zealand
- Coordinates: 56°00′14″N 12°22′50″E
- Type: kettle hole (probably)
- Primary inflows: Fønstrup Bæk, several smaller streams, groundwater
- Primary outflows: Esrum Å
- Catchment area: 62 km^{2} (24 sq mi)
- Max. length: 8.4 km (5.2 mi)
- Surface area: 17.3 km^{2} (6.7 sq mi)
- Average depth: 13.5 m (44 ft)
- Max. depth: 22.3 m (73 ft)
- Water volume: 233 million cubic metres (189,000 acre⋅ft)
- Residence time: 12.7 years
- Surface elevation: Below 9.38 m (30.8 ft) in the summer. Below 9.48 m (31.1 ft) in the winter.
- Settlements: Fredensborg, Nødebo

Lake Esrum (Danish: Esrum Sø, pronounced [ˈesʁɔm ˈsøˀ]) is the largest lake in Denmark by water volume and the second-largest lake by surface area, after lake Arresø. It is situated in the central part of North Zealand (the northeastern region of Zealand), straddling the boundaries of the municipalities Hillerød, Fredensborg, Helsingør and Gribskov, some 40 kilometres north of Copenhagen.

The lake covers 17 km^{2}, Its length from north to south is 8.4 km and its maximum depth is 22 m. Its principal drainage is Esrum Å, a 10-km stream which passes Esrum Watermill and the remains of Esrum Abbey on its way to the Kattegat at Dronningmølle. The western shore of the lake is dominated by Gribskov, one of Denmark's largest forests, and the small town of Nødebo. Fredensborg Palace, one of the official residences of the Danish Royal Family, with its extensive gardens, is situated on the southeast shore. Boat trips operate on the lake from Sørup, a village just south of the palace gardens.

== History ==
=== Commercial fishing ===
Like many of the surrounding forests, Lake Esrum was originally a royal domain. It was first administrated by Eentekammeret and later by Frederiksborg Amtsstue on behalf of the Danish government. Fishing in the lake was entrusted with a fishing master (Danish: fiskemester) who resided at Fiskergården, located next to Slotsmøllen at Slotssøen in Hillerød. From 1864, fishing was carried out by private citizens and from 1907, fishing rights were sold at auction. Commercial fishing continued until 1989.

=== Esrum canal ===
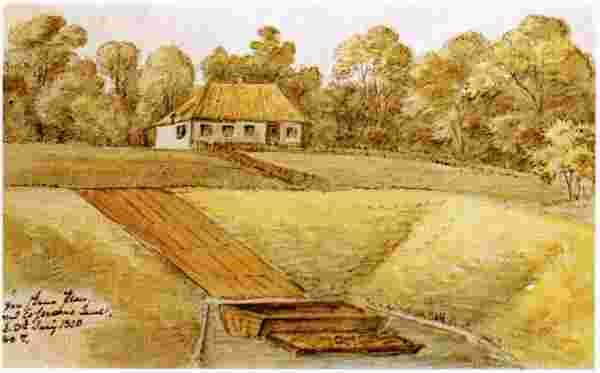
Væltningen as seen on a watercolour byO.J. Rawert from 1820

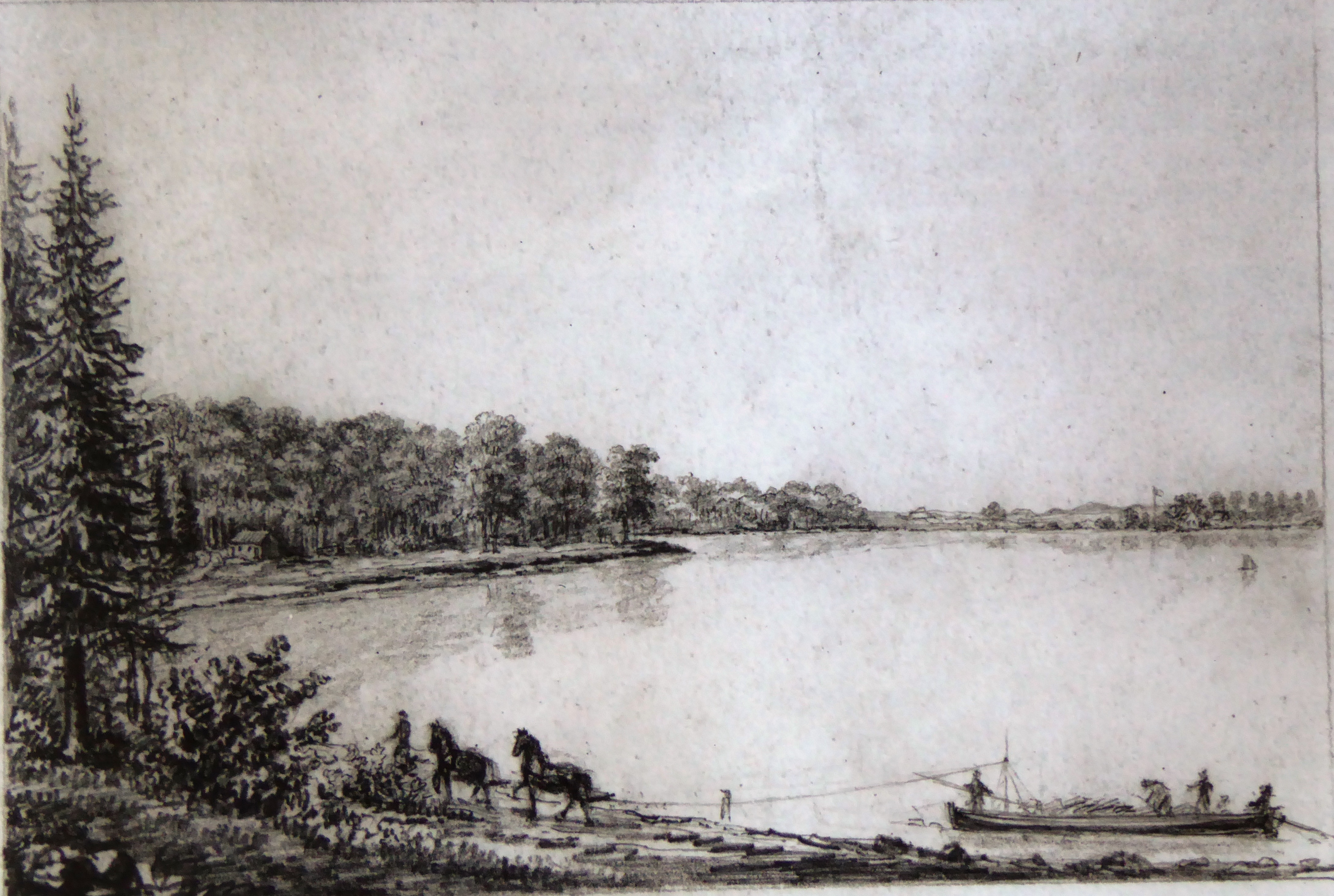
Transportation of firewood along the western shore of Lake Esrum in about 1830

From the beginning of the 19th century, Lake Esrum played a role in the transport of firewood from Grib Forest to Copenhagen. From 1802 to 1805, a canal was constructed between the north end of the lake and Dronningmølle. Here firewood was loaded onto large cargo ships and sailed to Copenhagen. The canal was 9 km long, 9 m wide and 1.5 m deep. The work was led by Adolph von der Recke and carried out by local peasants, soldiers and forced labour workers. A towpath ran on the banks of the canal and on the western shores of lake Esrum. The timber had to pass a 4-metre crater-like ramp called Væltningen, which connected the upper section of the canal to its lower part. The upper part of the canal passed two ponds. One of them, Storedam (Great Pond), was the site of a watermill which was first used as backup for the gunpowder mill in Frederiksværk during the English Wars and later for the manufacturing of textiles for the army. Transportation of firewood on the canal continued until 1874 and it was later used for leisure trips. It has now dried out and been covered by forest, but Væltningen and other elements are still visible in the landscape.

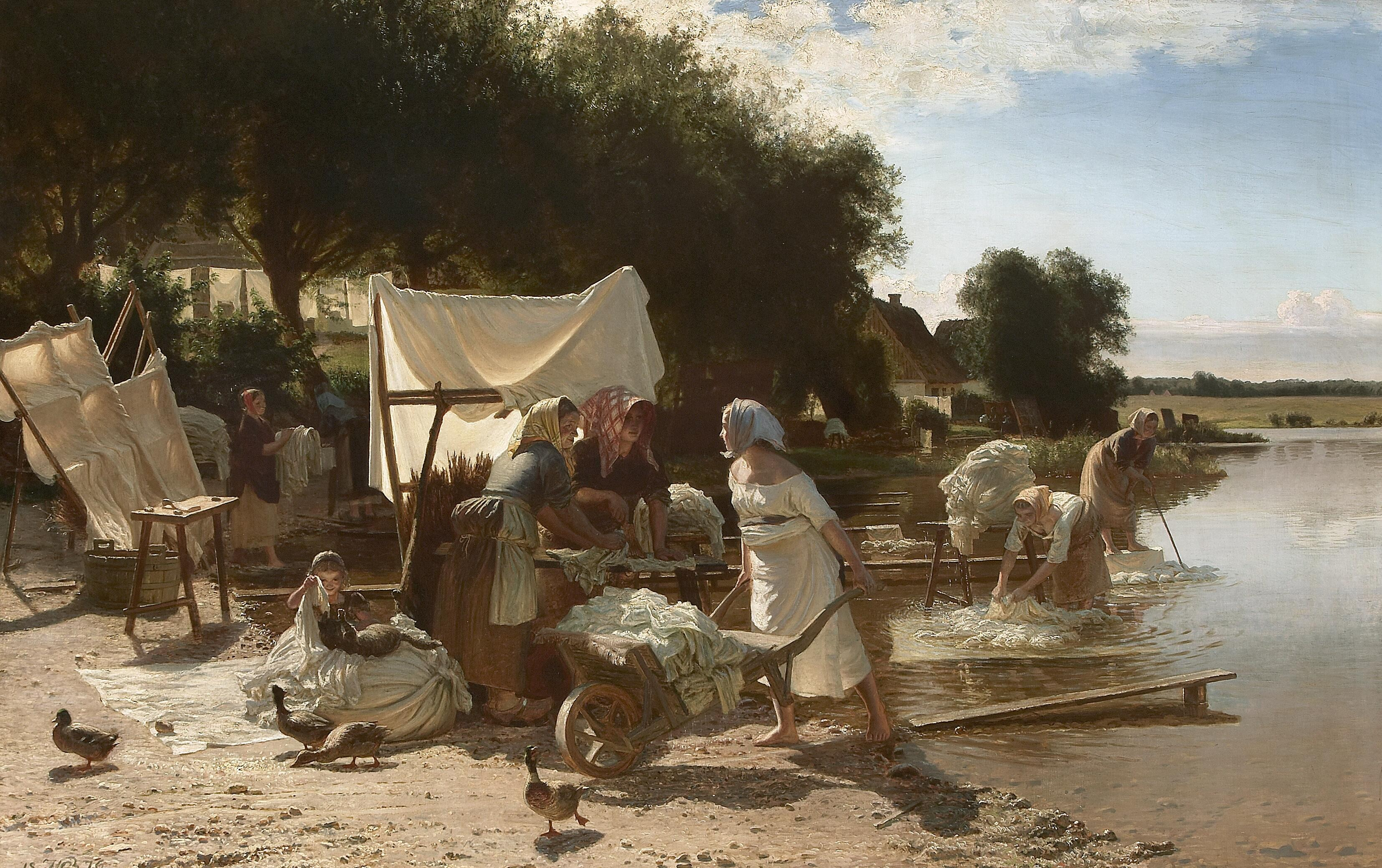
Sørup in 1876, painting by Hans Ole Brasen

=== Sørup's washhouses ===
From the middle of the 19th century, the small village of Sørup on the southeastern shores of the lake was home to numerous laundries. The laundry was picked up at institutions and wealthy households in Copenhagen, Hillerød and Elsinore. When the industry peaked, Sørup was home to 20 laundries with some one hundred employees.

== Hydrology ==
The water quality of lake Esrum is considered good.

Since 2002, there have been a few incidences of trematoda plaguing swimmers in the summertime every year. The trematodes are a natural part of lake Esrums' aquatic life.

== Ecology ==
Lake Esrum have a large population of European perch and Northern pike. Other species includes European eel, ruffe, bream, roach, tench and bleak. A smaller population of brown trout is living here, having adapted to the freshwater.

The professional fishing for eel, was previously substantial, but in 1997 the annual catch had fallen to 388 kg from a mere 14 tons. Nowadays, the lake is exclusively fished by anglers.

The birdlife at the lake is varied. The common goldeneye was formerly a rare breeding bird in Denmark, but after a determined effort involving artificial nests, the species is almost a signature of lake Esrum. Other common birds here includes Eurasian coot, mallard, tufted duck, great crested grebe and mute swan. The reed beds along the lake brinks, hold many swan nests and in the southern end, a colony of the great cormorant have found a home, with several hundreds of nests.

== Protections ==
Lake Esrum is part of a larger 7,400 ha Natura 2000 area, comprising Gribskov and a few smaller woodlands nearby. It is included in the Kongernes Nordsjælland National Park.

== Recreation ==
"Esrum Sø Bådfart" (Lake Esrum Boat Service) operates boat trips on the lake from Chaluphuset, a former royal boathouse located at Sørup on the south side of Fredensborg Palace gardens. Chaluphuset is also used as a venue from special events. Esrum Sø Bådfart also operates a café in Fendrikshus, a former forest worker's house in Gribskov on the other side of the lake. The café is open Friday-Sunday and can be reached by boat or on foot or bicycle through the forest. Skipperhuset, Chaluphuset's next door neighbour, is a lunch restaurant overlooking the lake.

== Cultural references ==
Egon (Ove Sprogøe) and Kjeld (Morten Grunwald) are quarrelling with Lake Esrum as a backdrop (in Nødebo Holt) at 1:02:54 in the 1978 Olsen-banden film The Olsen Gang Sees Red.

== Sources ==
- Esrum Sø Danish Nature Agency (in Danish)
- Driftsplan, management plan for Lake Esrum from Naturstyrelsen (in Danish)
