= Munkerup =

Coastal district of Hornbæk-Dronningmølle, Zealand, Denmark

Coordinates: 56°06′25″N 12°22′00″E

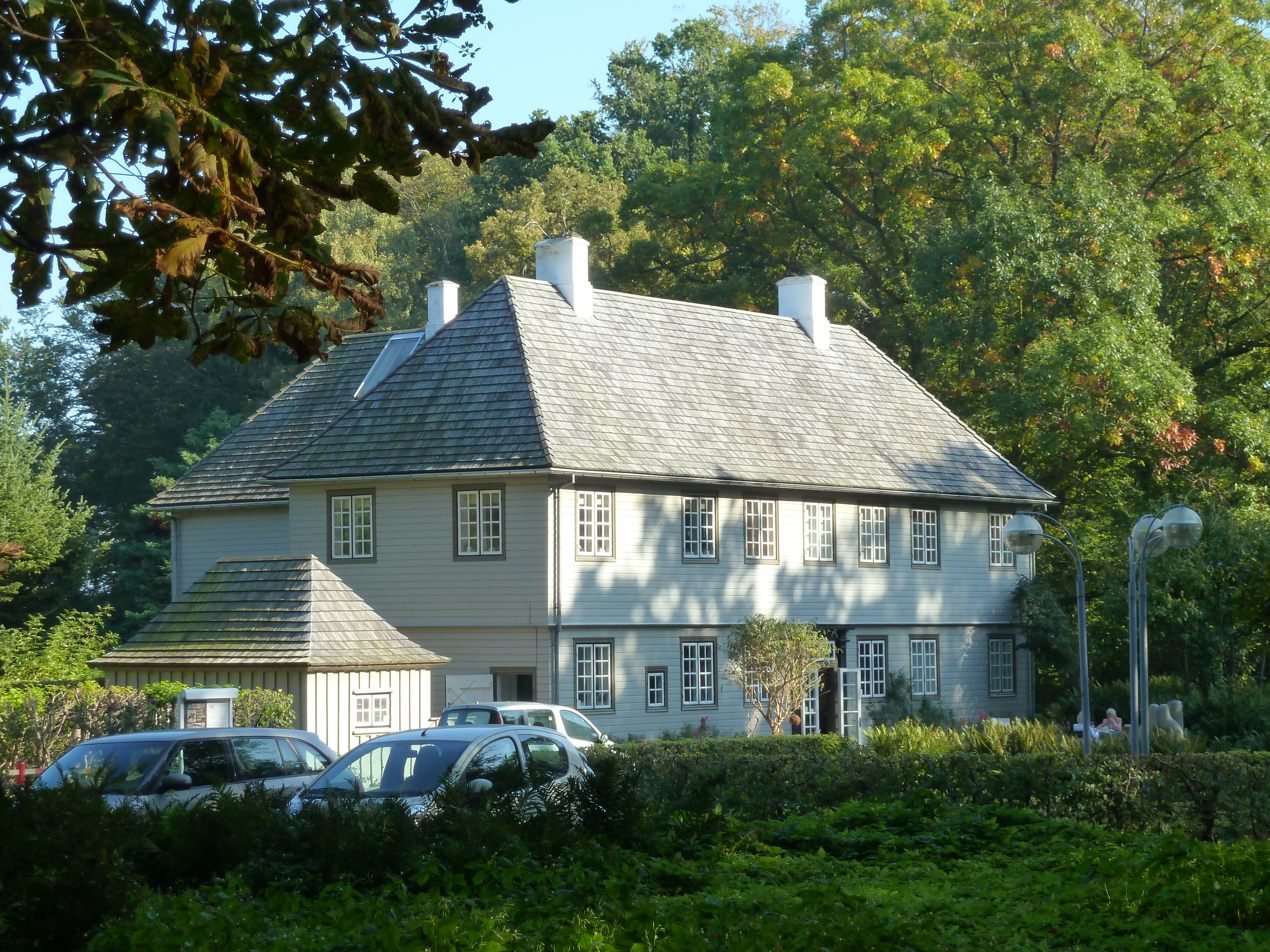
Munkeruphus

Munkerup is a coastal district of Hornbæk-Dronningmølle in the north of Zealand, Denmark. It is located in Gribskov Municipality, two kilometres to the west of Dronningmølle and four kilometres east of Gilleleje. In 2009, Munkerup had a population of 791.

== History ==
The name of the locality is first documented as "Munnckerup" in 1582. In the so-called Markbogen 1681, Munkerup is listed as consisting of two half farms and two rural houses in Tornbakke and three rural houses in Hulerød. Munkerup began to develop as a coastal resort around 1920 when artists such as Carl Locher and Holger Drachmann began to visit. Around 1936, the first summer houses began to appear around Grøndahlsvej but it was in the 1950s and 1960s that they really became popular in the area. The fashionable seaside hotel Hulerød Badehotel attracted guests from Copenhagen. Some, like the architect Poul Henningsen, built their own summer houses. In the mid-1930s, Munkerup Children's Sanatorium (Munkerup Børnesanatorium), opened for children suffering from glandular trouble.

Munkeruphus, a Colonial-styled residence located on the coastal side of the main road, was built in 1916 by the architects Terkel Hjejle and Niels Rosenkjær. In 1958, it became the home of the artist and designer Gunnar Aagaard Andersen. Since 1989, it has been an exhibition centre.

== Notable people ==
- Gunnar Aagaard Andersen (1919 — 1982 Munkerup) was a Danish sculptor, painter, designer and architect whose work belongs to the Concrete art movement; lived in Munkeruphus from 1958

== Literature ==
- Madsen, Lars Bjørn (2003). Nordkysten: fra Helsingør til Munkerup : Mennesker og huse. Cicero. ISBN 978-87-7714-568-1.
