= Rudolph Tegner =

Danish sculptor (1873–1950)

Rudolph Tegner (12 July 1873 – 5 June 1950) was a Danish sculptor linked to the Symbolist movement. In the early 20th century his work caused considerable controversy in Denmark. A large number of his works are on display in the Rudolph Tegner Museum north of Copenhagen.

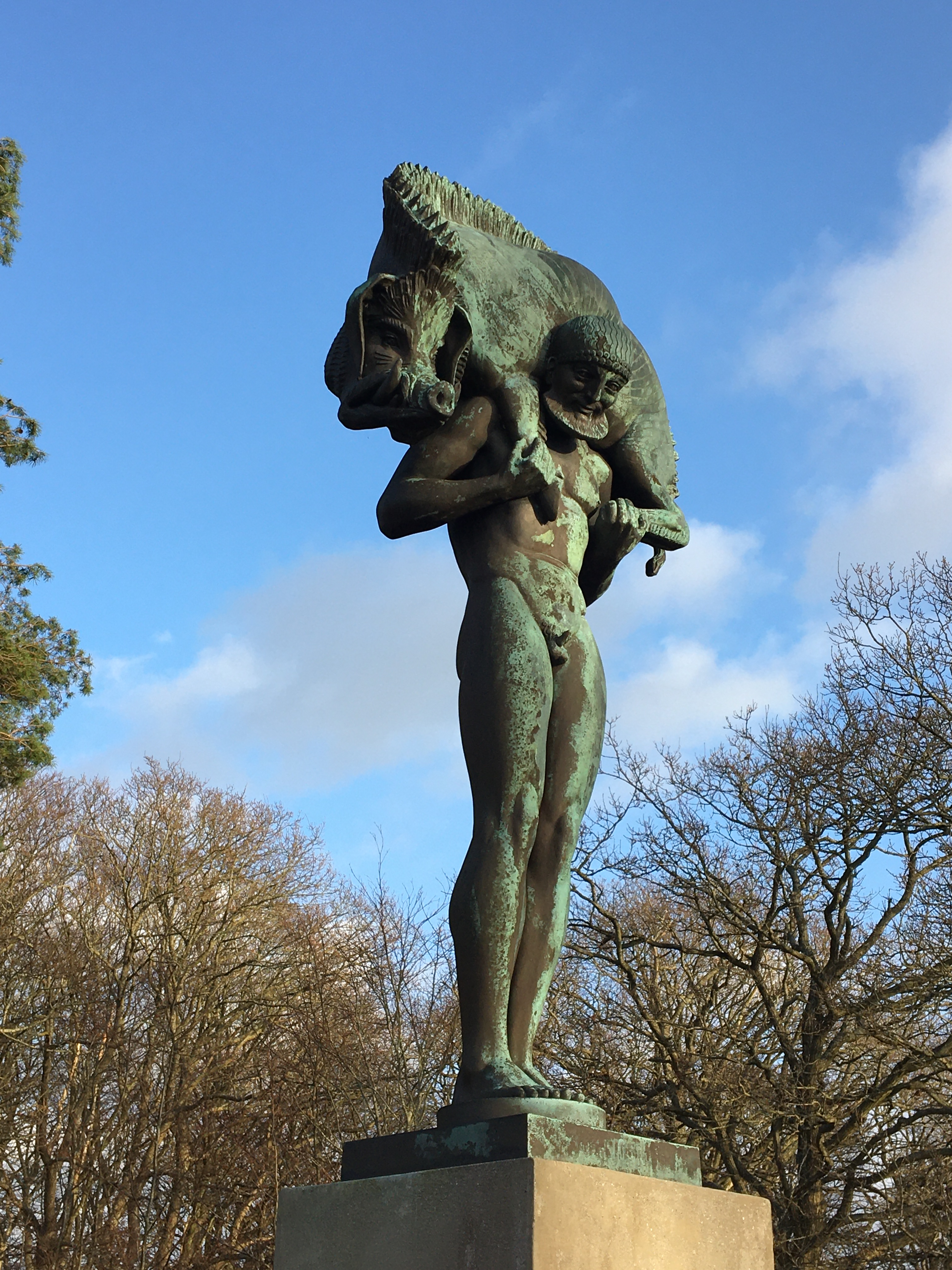
Heracles and the Wild Boar (1919)

== Biography ==
Tegner was born in Copenhagen. He was the son of politician and businessman Jørgen Henry August Tegner and his wife Signe Elisabeth Puggaard. He was trained at the Royal Danish Academy of Fine Arts.

He travelled to Greece and to Italy as a young man, where he was particularly impressed by Michelangelo's sculptures in the Medici Chapel. His first major work, A Faun (1891) was installed at Charlottenburg Palace. From 1890 to 1893 he collaborated with the Norwegian sculptor Gustav Vigeland, and then moved to Paris, where he resided until 1897. Tegner's sculptures developed the stylistic innovations of Art Nouveau and the erotic realism of Auguste Rodin. This caused widespread debate in Denmark, which was still heavily influenced by the restrained neo-classical ideals of Bertel Thorvaldsen. Tegner, in contrast, emphasised violent monumental forms which were both eye-catching and provocative.

Tegner was influenced strongly by the ideas of Friedrich Nietzsche, especially as filtered through the writings of Georg Brandes. He created a statuette entitled Lucifer with Brandes's Head (1902), a reference to Brandes' nickname "Lucifer". It has been described as showing the author as if he were "almost like his own worst enemy, or at least seems unafraid of aiming barbs at himself." Images of struggling figures influenced by Nietzschean ideas run throughout his work. Brandes himself defended Tegner's most controversial work, a monument to the physician and Nobel Laureate Niels Finsen, which was installed in Copenhagen in 1909. It shows a standing naked man flanked by two kneeling naked women, reaching up to the sky. The sculpture was entitled Mod lyset (Towards the Light). It symbolised Finsen's principal scientific theory, that specific wavelengths of sunlight have healing properties.

In 1911 Tegner married the painter Elna Jørgensen (1889–1976). In 1916, he acquired barren uncultivated land in Zealand in the vicinity of Helsingør. He subsequently built a museum and sculpture park dedicated to his work in this bleak landscape. From 1917 on he installed a number of his sculptures there, mainly on classical themes. He also created a building in an uncompromising minimalist style to function as a museum for his work. Among the works on display are the sculpture Heracles and the Wild Boar (1919).

Rudolph Tegner died on 5 June 1950. He was buried in a mausoleum at the centre of the museum complex, which is open to the public.

== See also ==
- Isaac Wilhelm Tegner (lithographer)

== Other sources ==
- Hans Jørgen Bonnichsen, Myten Rudolph (2003) Tegners skitser og malerier (Rudolph Tegners Museum) ISBN 87-989591-0-7
