= Esbønderup =

- Town
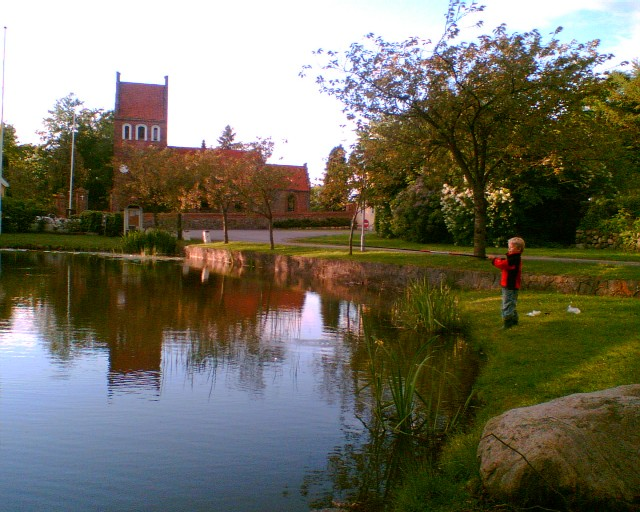
- Church and the village pond at Esbønderup

- Location in Denmark Esbønderup (Capital Region)
- Coordinates: 56°3′N 12°21′E
- Country: Denmark
- Region: Capital Region
- Municipality: Gribskov

Area
  - Urban: 1.14 km^{2} (0.44 sq mi)

Population (2026)
  - Urban: 1,416
  - Urban density: 1,240/km^{2} (3,220/sq mi)
- Time zone: UTC+1 (CET)
  - Summer (DST): UTC+2 (CEST)
- Postal code: DK-3230 Græsted

Esbønderup is a parish and small town situated north of Lake Esrum in Gribskov Municipality, North Zealand. some 40 km (25 mi) north of Copenhagen, Denmark. As of 1 January 2026, it had a population of 1,416.

== History ==
The name is known from 1178 as Esbiornsthorp, derived from the male name Esbiorn (Esben) and the suffix -thorp. Other villages in the parish of Esbønderup were Esrum (1100: Esrom), Saltrup (1359: Salthorp), Villingebæk (1100: Widelingbec) and Villingerød 1178: Withlingeruth).

The second doctor in Kronborg County was stationed in Esbønderup in 1738. Kronborg County Hospital (Kronborg Amtssygehus) opened in 1866 at the initiative of Friederich Carl von Gram, two years before Frederiks Hospital opened in Copenhagen. It was a small building, nine bays long and three bays wide, half timbered and with a straw roof. A public hospital was not opened in Helsingør until 1764. It was only used by the poor while people with means received treatment in their homes. The larger Øresund Hospital was inaugurated in Helsingør in 1796. It was reserved for the residents of the market town while those of the rural parishes belonged to the County Hospital in Esbønderup. A new hospital, inaugurated in 1867, was expanded with two new buildings in 1908.

Esbønderup was the main town of the civil parish (sognekommune) of Esbønderup-Nødebo until the 1970 Danish Municipal Reform when it was merged with Græsted Municipality while Nødebo was merged with Hillerød Municipality.

== Description ==
The old village, also referred to as Kirke Esbønderup, consisting mainly of houses from the 19th century, is located in the northern part of town. The modern district to the south now connects Esbønderup to Esbønderup Kohave. The two villages officially merged in 2010.

== Cultural references ==
- Frank Jæger's poem Kirsten og vejen fra Gurre (Kirsten and the road from Gurre) refers to "Esbønderup- The White Hospital".
- The final scenes of the 1969 Danish film Soldaterkammerater på bjørnetjeneste were filmed around the village pond in Esbønderup. The hospital was converted into a rehabilitation centre in 1966 and closed in 2011.

== Notable people ==
- Herman Siegumfeldt (1833 at Haregabsgaarden, Esbønderup - 1912) a Danish genre and landscape painter
- Valdemar Bandolowski (born 1946 in Esbønderup), sailor and twice gold medallist in the Soling Class at the 1976 and 1980 Summer Olympics

== See also ==
- Tikøb
