= Rudolph Tegner Museum =

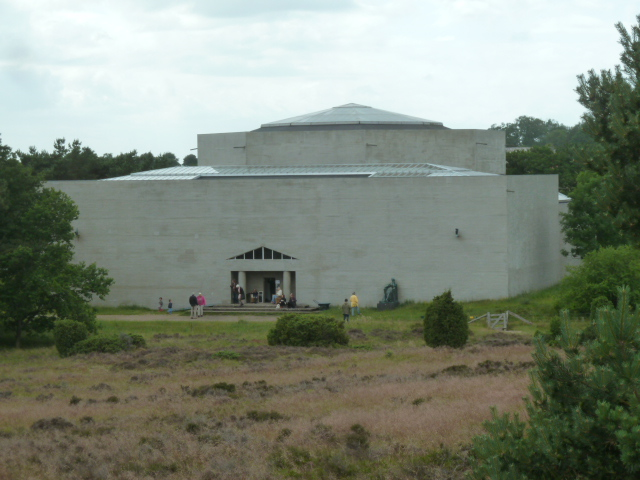
- The building in the distance
- Established: 1938
- Location: Dronningmølle, Denmark
- Coordinates: 56.0864°N 12.4008°E
- Website: www.rudolphtegner.dk

The Rudolph Tegner Museum is set in the middle of a protected area just south of Dronningmølle on Zealand's north coast, some 50 km north of Copenhagen, Denmark. The museum is dedicated to the oeuvre of the sculptor Rudolph Tegner (1873–1950). The museum exhibits some 250 of Tegner's sculptures as well as models in plaster, clay, bronze and marble. The surrounding terrain features 14 of his statues.

== History ==
Rudolph Tegner acquired the central portion of the area in 1916. He initially mounted the group sculpture King Oedipus and Antigone and later, in 1924, followed the group sculpture The Enigma of Lone and then several others. The museum building was built to Tegner's own design with the assistance of the architect Mogens Lassen (1901–1987). Construction began in 1937 and it was inaugurated in 1938. A renovation was completed in 2003.

== Architecture ==
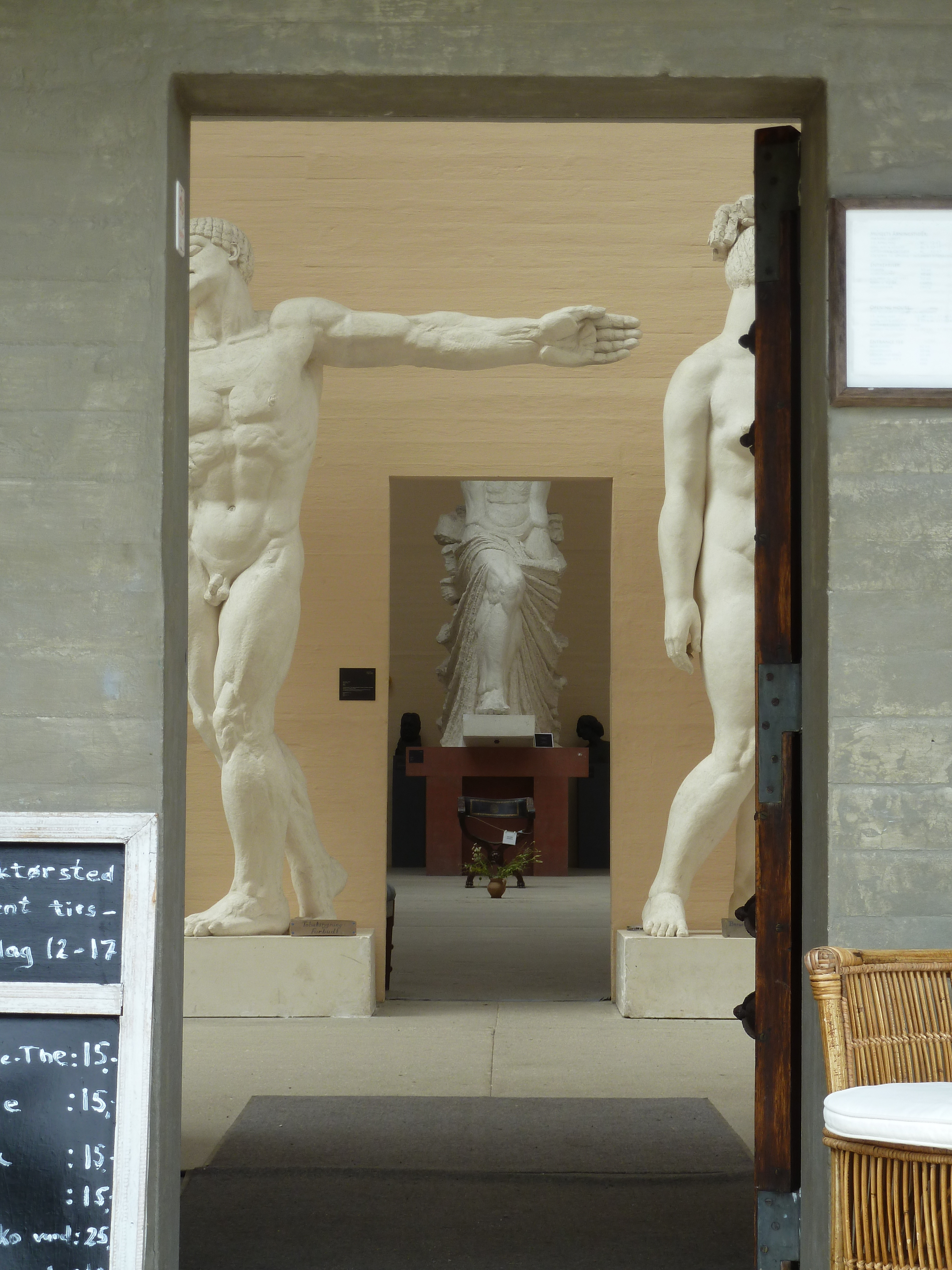
Peeking through the entrance to the museum

The museum is built in concrete to an unusual bunker-like Modernist design. The building needed large dimensions to embrace Tegner's works many of which are of very large proportions. The core of the museum is a large octagonal gallery with ceilings 11 metres high. The original intention was to build lower galleries on all of its sides but for economic reasons only two of these galleries were built, leaving three out of eight of the core sides unbound. The museum has been built without picture windows to avoid distracting the visitor with views of the scenic surroundings. Except for a small window in the gable, all natural light comes from skylights. Concrete as a material was chosen for reasons of fire safety.

The difference in scale between the entrance section and the main gallery is designed to create an overwhelming experience for those entering the museum and to enhance its character of a treasury. The façade bears reference to Antique architecture.

== Sculpture park ==
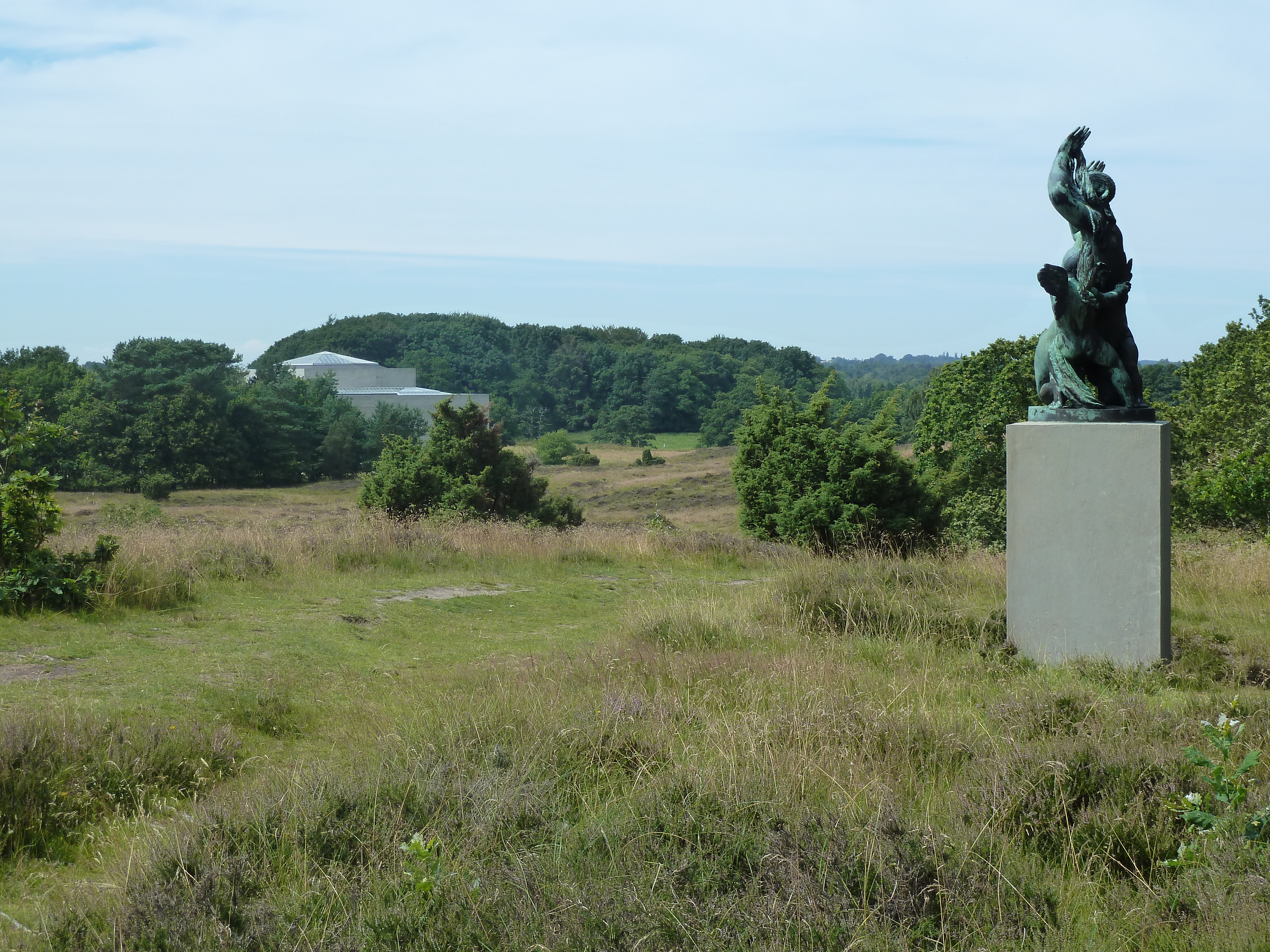
Sculpture park with the museum building in the background

The Rudolph Tegner Museum and Statue Park is run and is owned by a private grant founded by Rudolph and Elna Tegner. The site which Tegner later ceded to the Danish State originally covered some 17 hectares of land in the core of an area known as Rusland, the Danish name for Russia. It consists of undulating heath with scattered trees and juniper vegetation.

== See also ==
- List of single-artist museums
