= Esrum Abbey =

Monastery in Denmark

Coordinates: 56.0476°N 12.3772°E

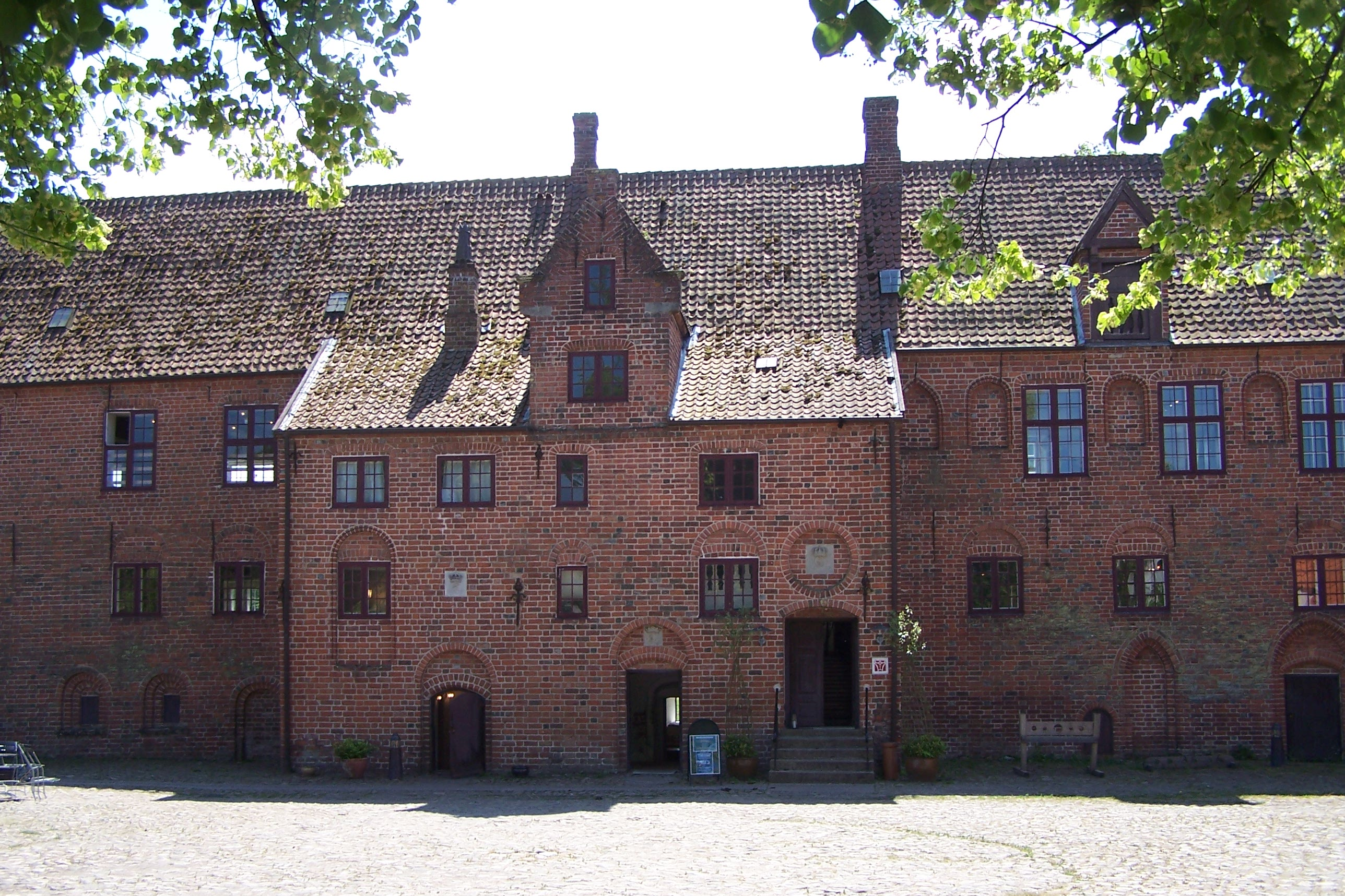
Esrum Abbey

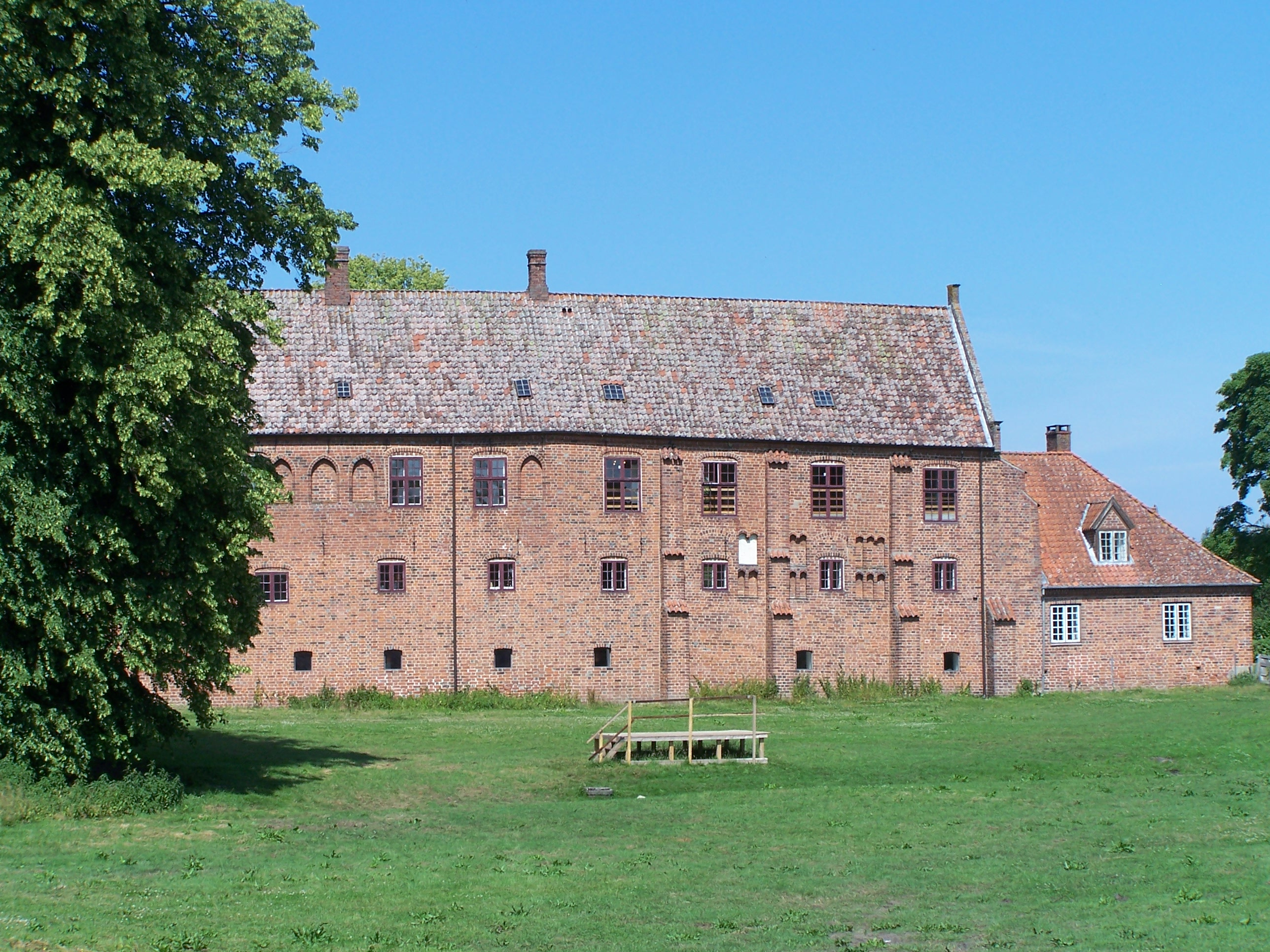
Esrum Abbey

Esrum Abbey, also Esrom Abbey (Danish: Esrum or Esrom Kloster), was the second Cistercian monastery founded in Denmark, located near Hillerød in Region Hovedstaden, on the island of Zealand (Sjælland), on the north side of the Esrum Sø (Lake Esrum) near Esbønderup and Græsted.

== History ==
=== Monastery ===
Esrum Abbey began as a Benedictine foundation, perhaps in about 1140, and was built near a pre-Christian religious site, later called Esrum Spring, where a small wooden stave chapel may have existed before the abbey was established. The foundation was taken over by the Cistercians in 1151 with the approval of Archbishop Eskil of Lund. It was then counted as a daughter house of Clairvaux.

Esrum in its turn became the mother house of a number of other important Cistercian foundations: Vitskøl Abbey and Sorø Abbey in Denmark; Ryd Abbey, now in Schleswig-Holstein; and Kołbacz Abbey near Szczecin. Monks from Esrum also founded Dargun Abbey in Mecklenburg in 1172, but abandoned it after hostile military action in 1198, and the later history of Dargun rests on its re-foundation in 1208 from Doberan Abbey. The former community from Dargun went on however to found Eldena Abbey. Esrum Abbey burned down in 1194 and again in 1204, resulting in the construction of a new church – a three-aisled basilica with transepts and a rectangular choir – and a monastery built of red brick, the most common building material of the time in the region.

In 1355 the Queen, Helvig of Schleswig, consort of King Valdemar IV of Denmark (Valdemar Atterdag), became a lay sister at Esrum after being supplanted by King Valdemar's mistress, Tove. The queen was buried in the abbey church, which brought royal gifts of property for the abbey. Her daughter, Margaret I of Denmark, continued Esrum's royal patronage, which attracted increased benefactions from other noble families on Zealand.

==== Codex Esromensis ====
A transcript of a collection of papers of the abbey between 1374 and 1497, consisting mostly of letters, has been preserved in Det Kongelige Bibliotek as the "Codex Esromensis" (Danish: Esrum Klosters Brevbog).

=== Dissolution and after ===
Denmark became Lutheran in 1536 with the adoption of the Lutheran Ordinances by the king and State Council. As a result, Esrum became a crown estate. It was allowed to continue to function as a monastery until 1559, when the remaining 11 monks and the abbot were sent to Sorø Abbey. The buildings at Esrum were then largely dismantled for building materials, apparently for use at Kronborg Castle to which the abbey estate was given.

In the 17th century the remaining structures were converted into a hunting lodge for the king and his courtiers, and the site was also used as a stud farm until 1717, after which it became a barracks for dragoons until 1746. From then on the buildings were used for a variety of military and civil administrative offices, becoming the property of the local government administration of Frederiksborg Amt.

During World War II the site was temporarily used as a secure storage site for the Danish National Archives. Immediately after the war, it was used to house Latvian refugees.

== Present-day ==
The site and structures were thoroughly restored in 1996. The surviving buildings – the south wing of the conventual buildings and a watermill – have received protected status as a national historic monument and are now used as a museum and a school for the study of nature and the environment. A number of other leisure facilities and activities are also provided, including medieval re-enactments.

== Legends ==
A number of legends survive concerning the abbey.

=== Brother Daniel ===
One, about Brother Daniel, a monk at Esrum, illustrates the connection between religious houses. Brother Daniel fell ill and sent word to Abbot Vilhelm of Æbelholt Abbey. Abbot Vilhelm laid his hand upon Daniel and told him to drink from the sacred spring at Esrum by which Daniel was healed. Thereafter the spring was believed to have healing power, especially for gout, rashes, and headaches.

=== Brother Rus ===
Another well-known legend from Esrum is the story of Brother Rus, a disguise Satan took in order to infiltrate the abbey as its cook. He ingratiated himself with the monks by bringing women into the monastic enclosure and serving the brothers meat.

=== King Valdemar ===
Another story is that Esrum Abbey came into conflict with King Valdemar I, who, in order to complete the construction of Gurre Castle, forced the monks at Esrum to work as construction labourers, much to the abbot's disapproval. When Valdemar died in that castle, his soul was condemned to hunt forever through the fields round about.

== Cheese ==
The cheese known as Esrum or Esrom is named after this monastery.

== Other sources ==
- Andreas Christian Anton Kierulf (1838) Esrom Klosters Historie (Kjøbenhavn, Reitzel)
