= Nødebo =

- Town
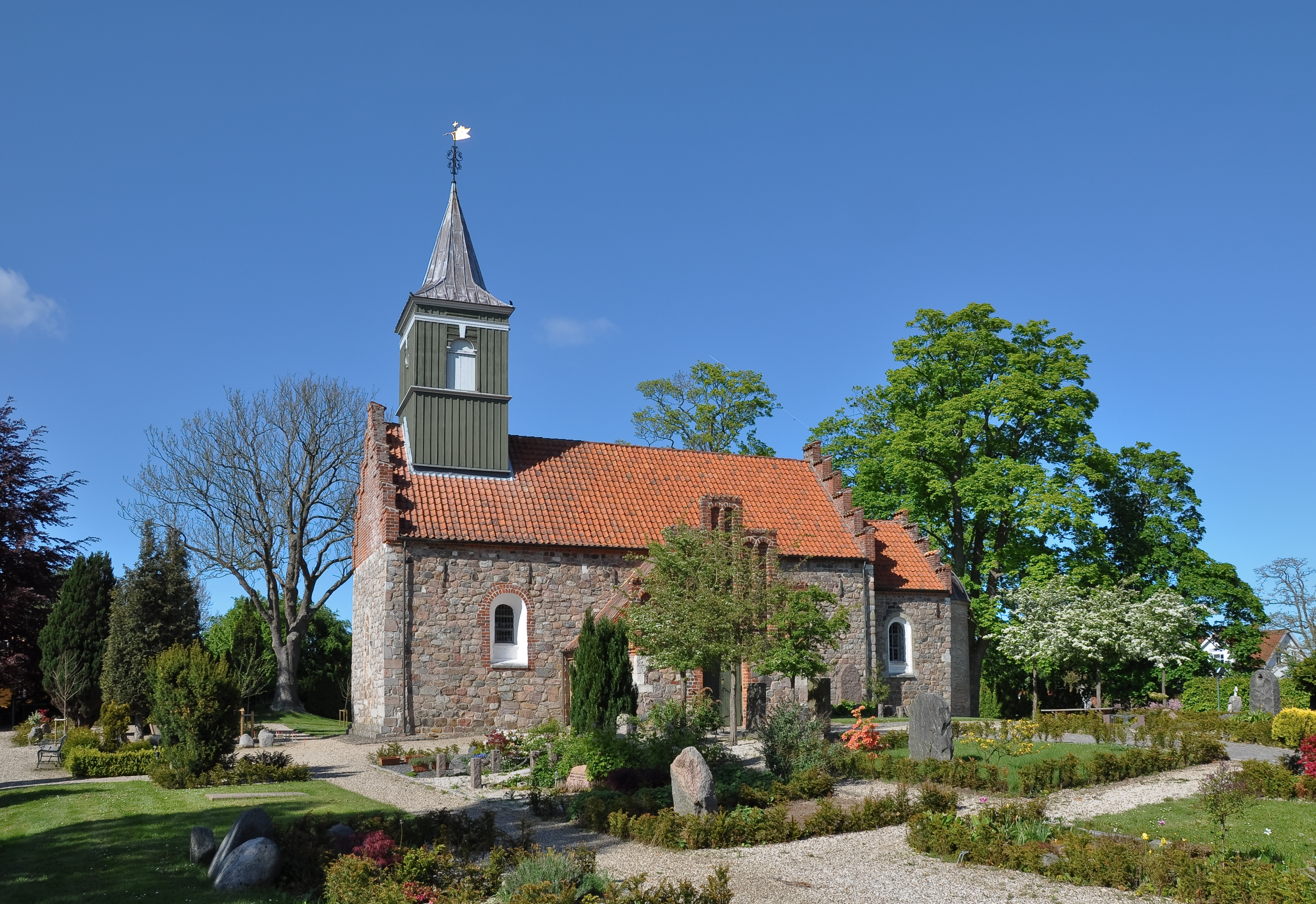
- Nødebo Church

- Location within Denmark Location within Capital Region
- Coordinates: 55°58′45″N 12°20′56″E
- Country: Denmark
- Region: Capital Region
- Municipality: Hillerød

Area
  - Urban: 1.3 km^{2} (0.50 sq mi)

Population (2026)
  - Urban: 2,057
  - Urban density: 1,600/km^{2} (4,100/sq mi)
- Time zone: UTC+1 (GMT)
- Postal code: 3480 Fredensborg

Nødebo is a village located on the southwestern shores of Lake Esrum in Hillerød Municipality, North Zealand, some 40 km north of Copenhagen, Denmark.

Nødebo Church, the oldest in the area, is notable for its church frescos and its early 16th century altarpiece.

Nødebo Kro a historic inn, now serves as a community centre and local cultural venue.

Nødebo is surrounded by Forest of Grib on three sides. Its par force hunting road well-preserved network was declared a UNESCO World Heritage Site in 2015. The Forest and Landscape College, now part of University of Copenhagen's Department of Geosciences and Natural Resources Management, is located in the northern part of Nødebo.

== History ==
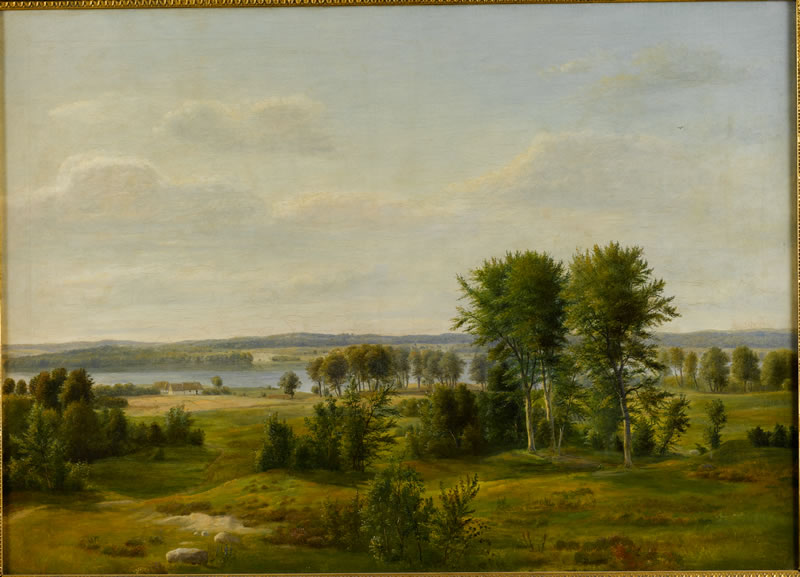
Dankvart Dreyer: From Lake Esrum: View towards Nødebo

The village of Nødebo was located in the vast forests north of Frederiksborg Castle. Traditional occupations included charcoal burner, farming and fishing in Lake Esrum.

== Description ==
Today Nødebo mainly consists of single family detached homes. Facilities include a primary school and a Netto store. Nødebo Kro was turned into a community centre and cultural venue in 1977. The current building is from 1915 when the inn was rebuilt after a fire. students from the Forest and Landscape College have built a number of public facilities such as shelters and a nature playground near the school. They also arranges public events such as an annual Christmas market.

Nødebo Church is the oldest church in the area. It is known for its murals. The altarpiece was painted by Jacob van Utrecht. Egelund House was built for built by Queen Dowager Louise Josephine in 1917. Today it is owned by Dansk Arbejdsgiverforening and used as a congress and training centre.

== Surroundings ==
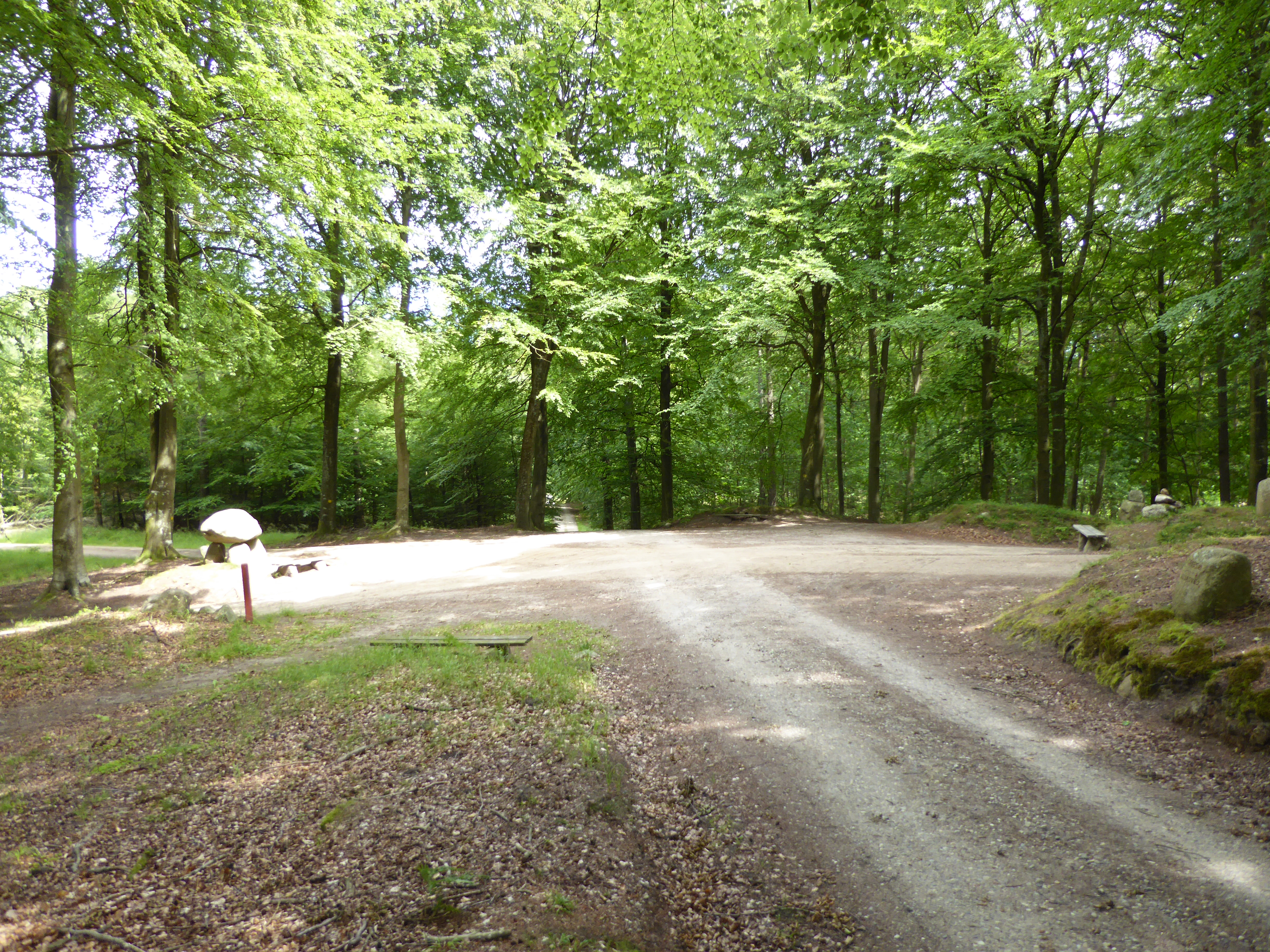
Ottevejskrydset, the 8-way junction, with the Søren Kierkegaard memorial to the left

Nødebo is surrounded by forest on three sides. Two gravel paths, one from the southern part of Nødebo and one from the Forest and Landscape College, leads up to Ottevejskrydset, the 8-way junction in the centre of Christian V's par force hunting road network in the forest. Søren Kierkegaard often visited the site and refers to it in Stages on Life's Way as the place with eight roads that no one travels by". A memorial stone was installed at the site in 1913 in connection with the 100 year anniversary of his birth.

The small woodland which separates the southernmost part of Nødebo from Lake Esrum is called Nødeboholt (or Holtet). Møllekrogen, the marshy area at the south side of Lake Esrum, is a bird sanctuary with several watchtowers for bird watching.

== Cultural references ==
Egon (Ove Sprogøe) and Kjeld (Morten Grunwald) is quarrelling on the shore of Lake Esrom in Nødebo Holt at 1:02:54 in the 1978 Olsen-banden film The Olsen Gang Sees Red..

== Notable people ==
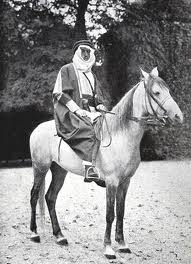
Johannes Østrup on horseback, 1893

- Johannes Østrup (1867–1938), philologist and rector of University of Copenhagen, lived in Nødebo and buried in Nødebo Church
- Peter Bastian (1943-2017) a Danish musician, lived in Nødebo
- Jørgen Marcussen (born 1950 in Nødebo), a former racing cyclist, competed the 1972 Summer Olympics
- Michala Petri (born 1958) a Danish recorder player, grew up in Nødebo
- Michelle Hviid, (Danish Wiki) (born 1972), lecturer and entrepreneur, grew up in Nødebo
- Kidd (born 1989) real name Nicholas Westwood Kidd is a Danish rapper and hip hop artist, he grew up in Nødebo
