= Master of Fogdö =

Swedish-Danish anonymous artist

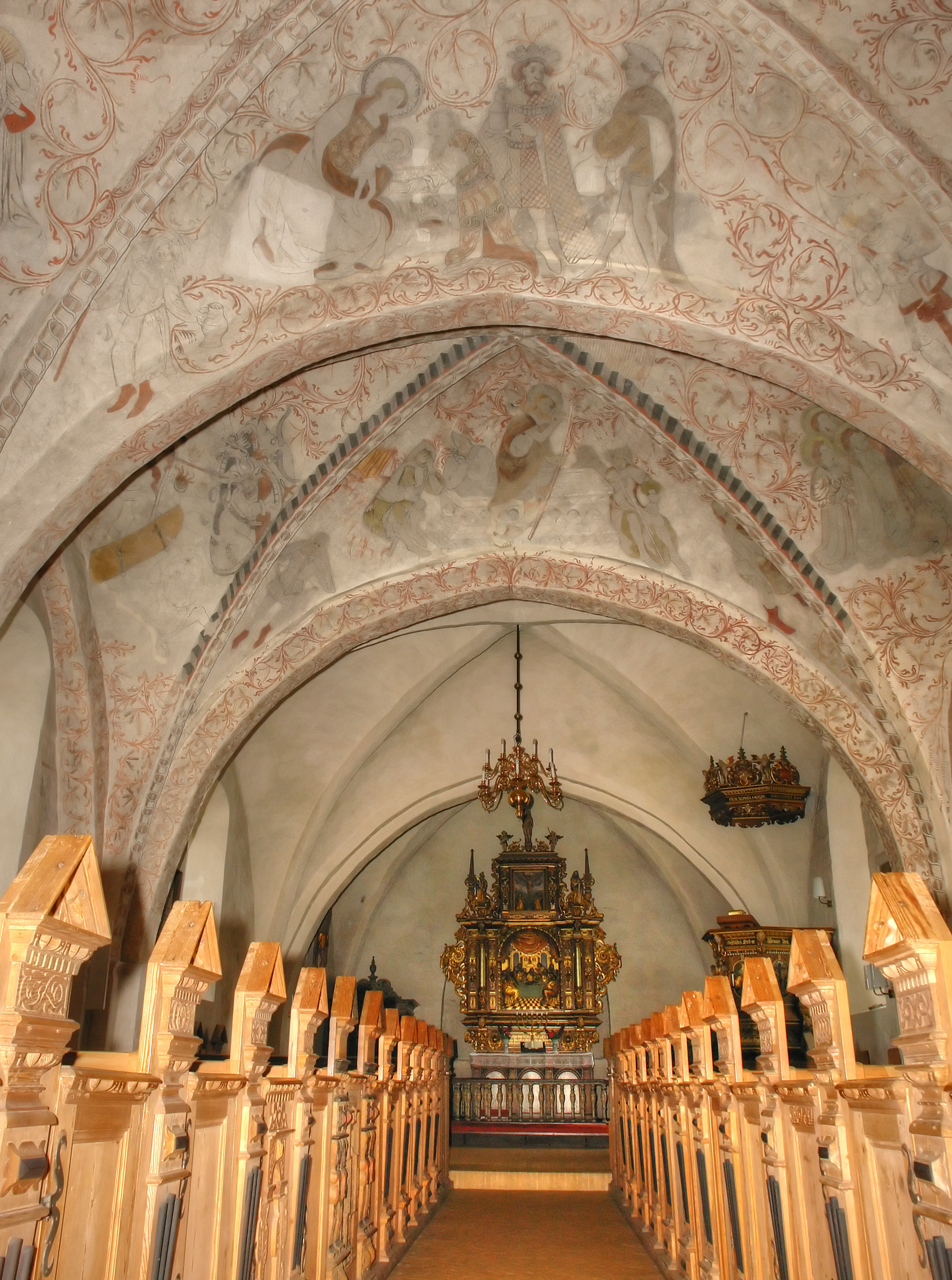
Frescos from around 1430–1450 in Undløse Church

Master of Fogdö (Swedish: Fogdömästaren; Danish: Unionsmästaren) is the name given to an anonymous artist active in Sweden and Denmark in the first half of the 15th century when he and his workshop decorated churches with frescoes of high artistic quality. His work can be seen in Fogdö Church (hence the name), Runtuna Church and Strängnäs Cathedral, all in Södermanland.

It has been suggested that the Master of Fogdö may also be responsible for the frescoes in the Danish churches of Undløse and Nødebo near Holbæk. The artist behind these is known as the Union Master (Danish: Unionsmesteren) but while there are similarities, especially in the figures, there are also differences making identification uncertain and calling for further research. The Master's style is thought to be closely related to that of the Schöne Stil.
