= Undløse Church =

Undløse Church Undløse Kirke
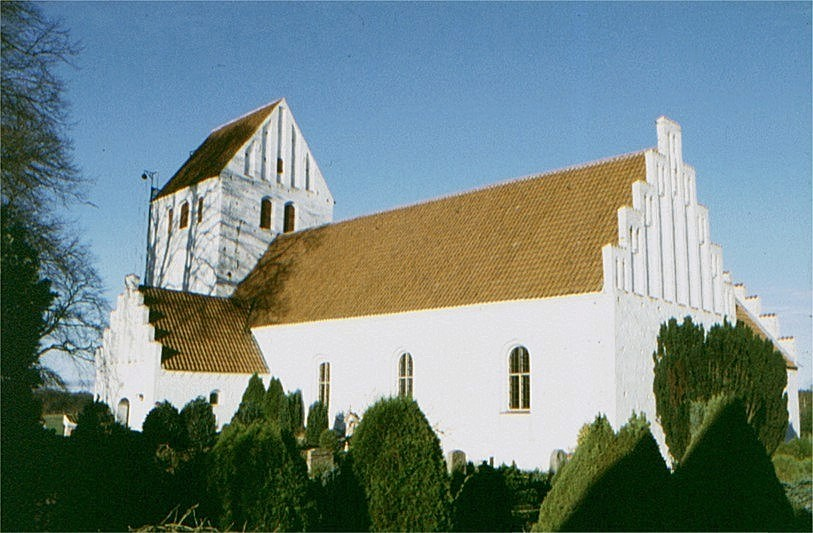
- Undløse Church
- Undløse Church; Undløse Kirke
- 55°36′21″N 11°34′57″E
- Location: Undløse
- Country: Denmark
- Denomination: Church of Denmark
- Previous denomination: Catholic

History
- Founded: Late 1100s
- Founder: Hvide
- Dedication: Lawrence of Rome

Architecture
- Functional status: Functional
- Style: Romanesque

Specifications
- Materials: Fieldstone, brick

Administration
- Division: Holbæk
- District: Northern Zealand

Undløse Church (Danish: Undløse Kirke) is located in the village of Undløse some 17 km (11 mi) southwest of Holbæk in northern Zealand, Denmark. The original part of the Romanesque church derives from the late 12th century. The church is noted for its early 15th-century frescoes and for its elaborate Baroque altarpiece and pulpit, both woodcuts by Abel Schrøder.

== History ==
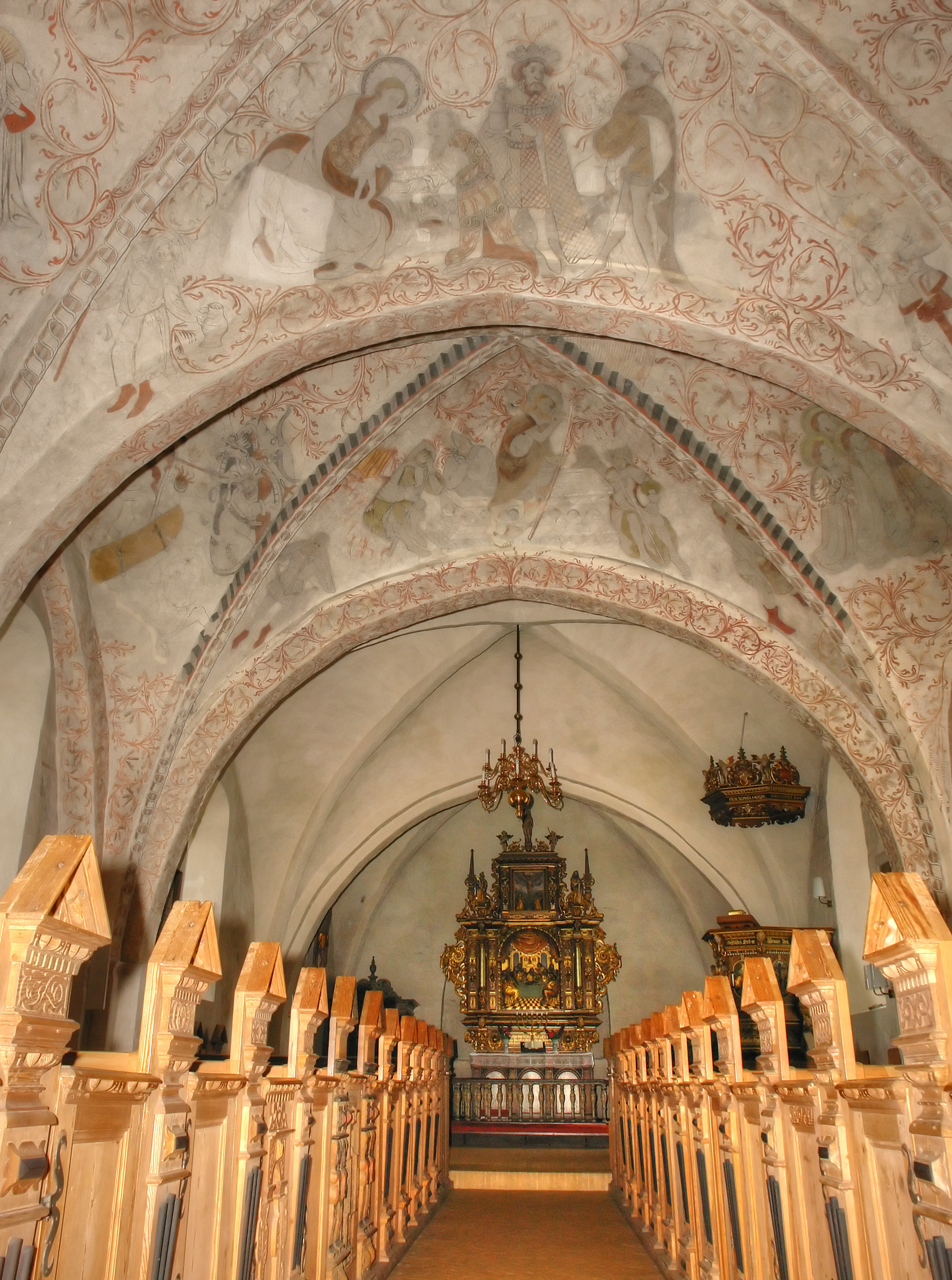
Undløse Church frescoes

The church, dedicated to Lawrence of Rome, belonged to the Hvide family and was under Absalon's jurisdiction. There is extensive documentation from the 12th century of transactions between Undløse and Sorø Abbey. The Roskilde cadaster from 1370 lists the taxation schedule for Undløse Church. Correspondence from 1357 to 1492 documents the early pilgrimages to Undløse and the various related religious ceremonies, all encouraged by a nearby sacred source. An indulgence communication from 1421 refers to the consecration of altars to Our Lady, St Lawrence and St Catherine. In 1441, the Bishop of the Faroes consecrated a chapel and altar to St Olaf and, in 1492, a letter mentions an altar to St Anne. In 1687, the church came into the ownership of Valdemar Christoffer Gabel (1650–1725), whereafter it was the property of Kongsdal until it became fully independent in 1910.

== Architecture ==
The original design was 12th-century Romanesque in raw and hewn fieldstone but substantial additions and replacements in a combination of brick and fieldstone were made in the Late Gothic period, leaving only the walls of the nave from the former structure. The three-sectioned, cross-vaulted ceiling is from the beginning of the 15th century. In the early 16th century, the porch and tower were added while the chancel and the apse were demolished and replaced with a considerably longer Gothic chancel, probably to accommodate the increasing number of pilgrims. A sacristy on the north side of the chancel was also added in the late Roman Catholic period. The north door was bricked up around 1400 while the south door remained in use. The two most westerly windows on the south wall, part of the original building, have been preserved but were renovated in 1957. Those on the north wall were enlarged in 1663.

== Furnishings ==
The rich artefacts and furnishings in Undløse Church have been unusually well preserved. Of particular note are the chalice from the first half of the 14th century and the chancel arch crucifix from the same period (although the figure is from the 15th century). The altarpiece (1644) and pulpit (1643) were crafted by the woodcarver Abel Schrøder and presented to the church by the vassal Frederik Reedtz and his wife. The chairs bearing the arms of the local nobility and the elaborately carved pews date from the last quarter of the 16th century. The grey granite Romanesque font is as old as the church itself but has undergone alterations. The decorated brass bowl from the Netherlands with the figures of a deer, a hare and a dog is from 1625. The single-keyboard organ built by Frederik Hoffmann Ramus of Copenhagen was presented to the church in 1852. The bellows mechanism was renewed by Frobenius in 1957.

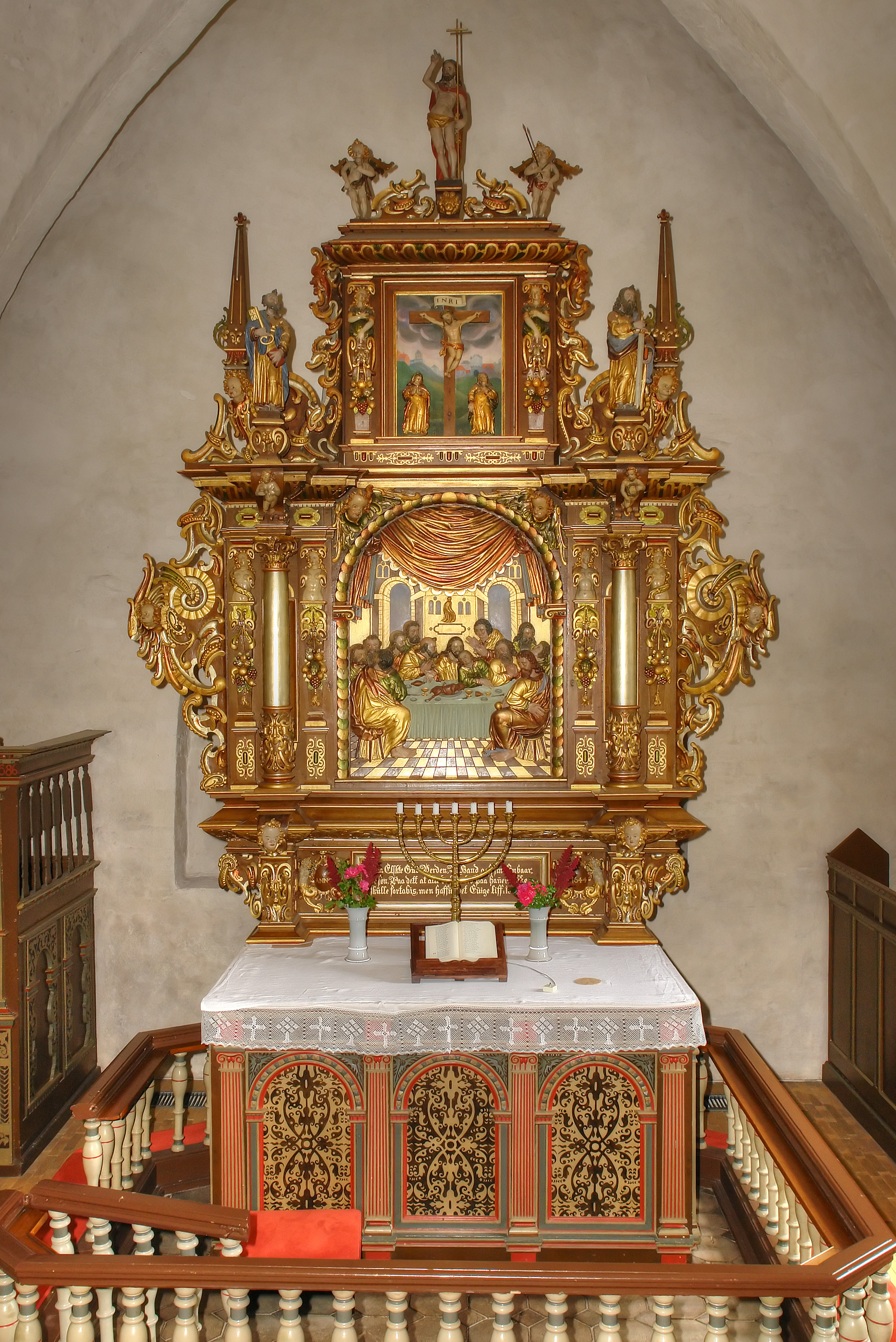
Altarpiece (1644)

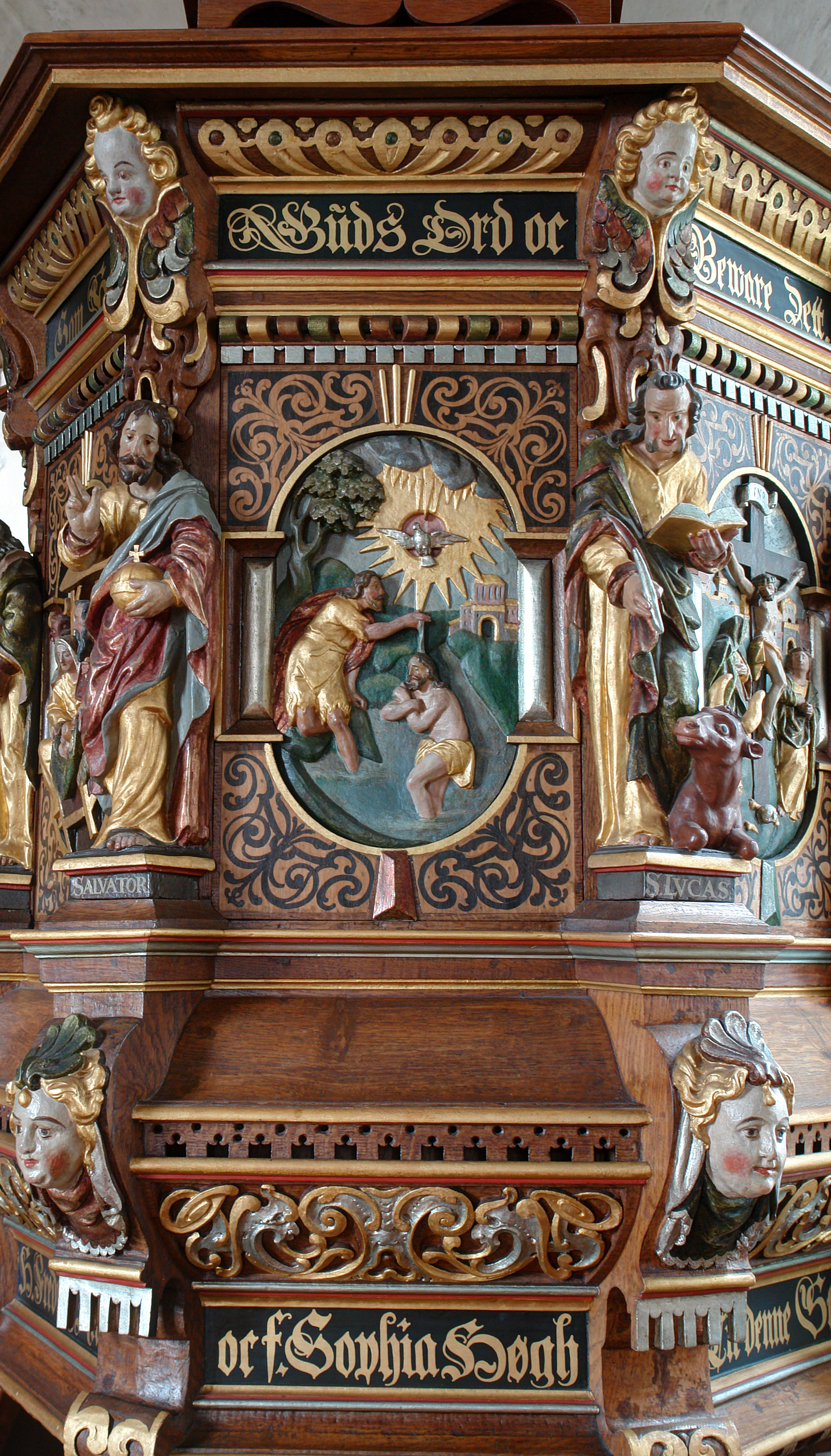
Pulpit detail

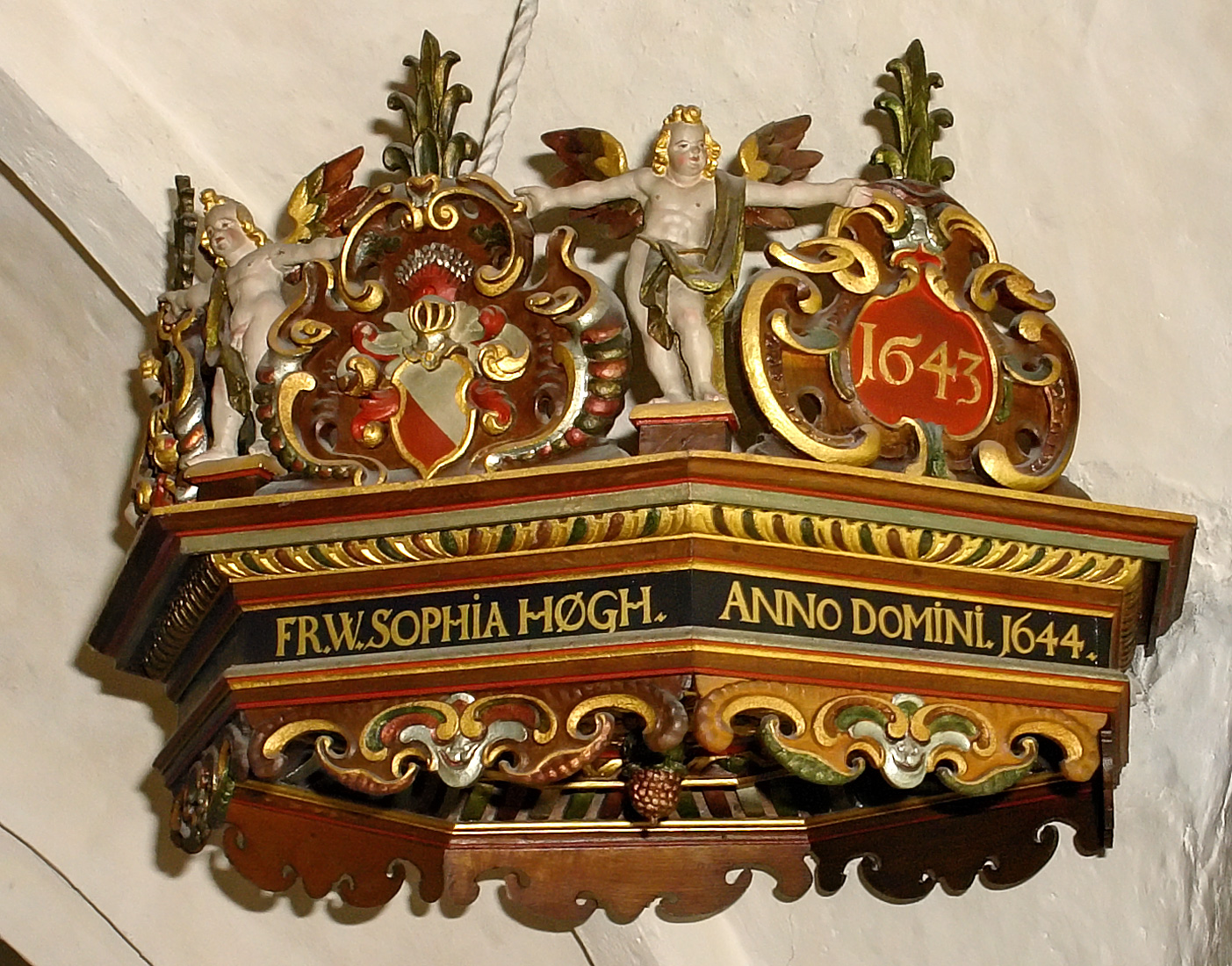
Pulpit canopy

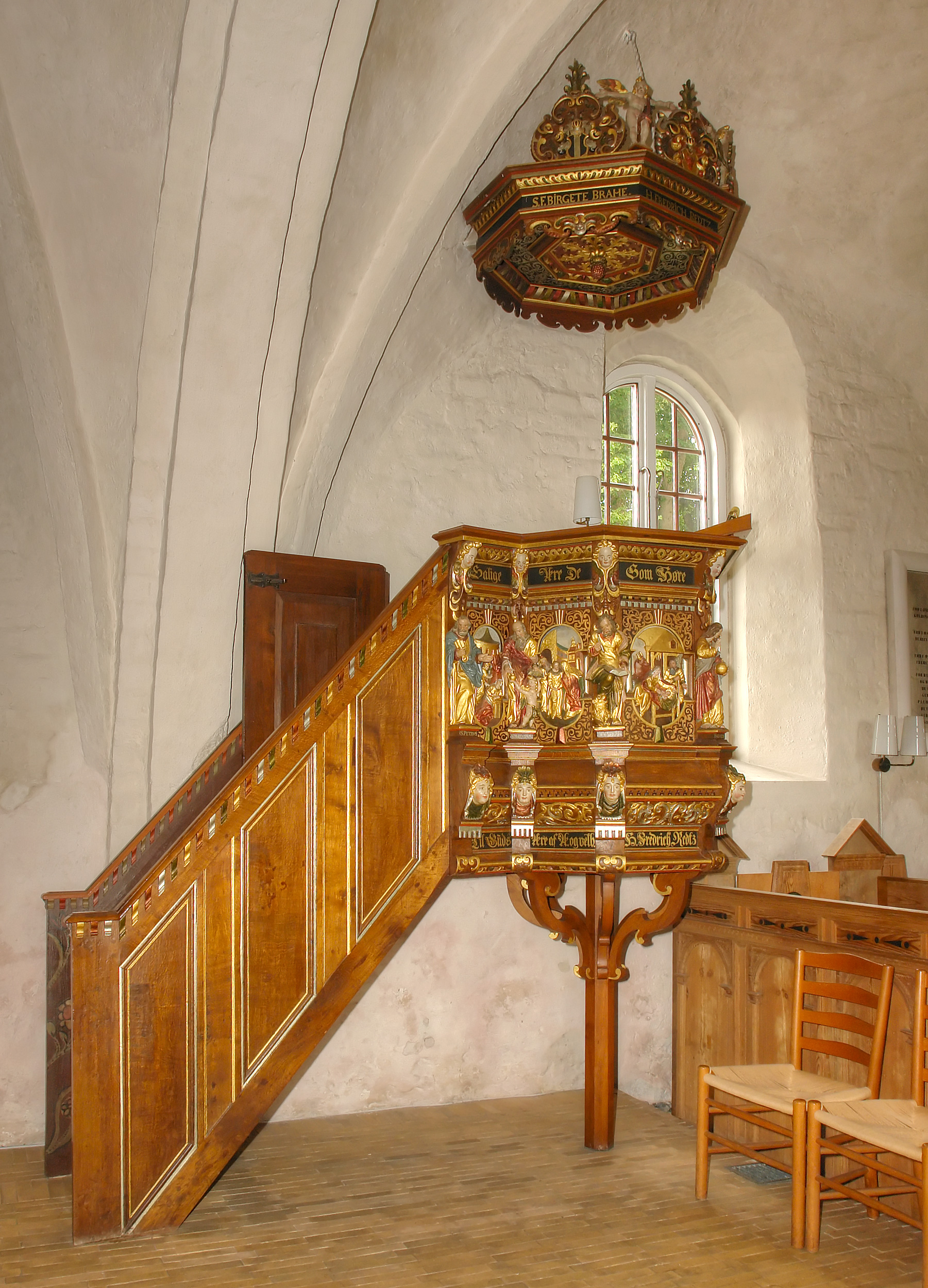
Pulpit (1643)

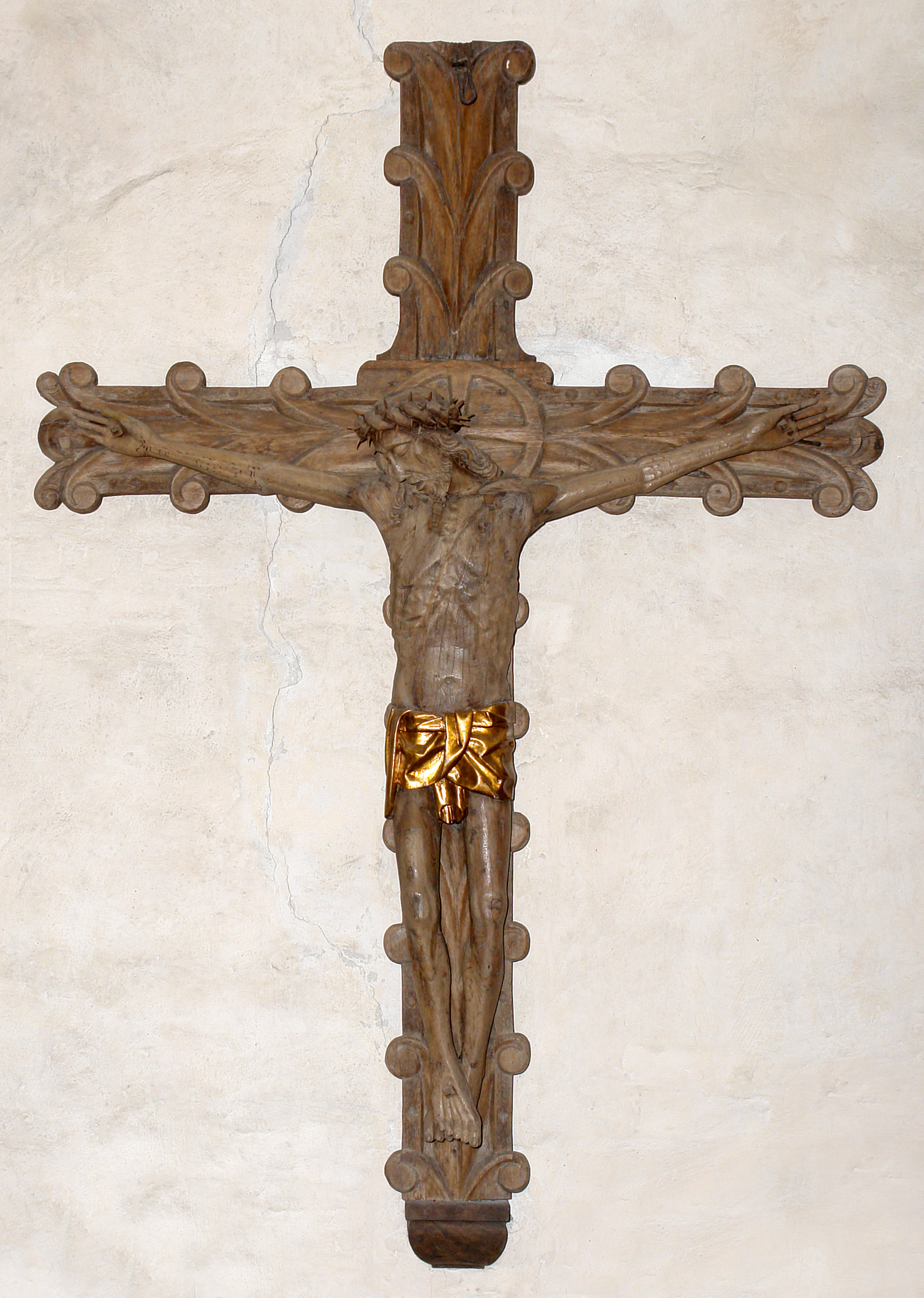
Chancel arch crucifix (c. 1450)

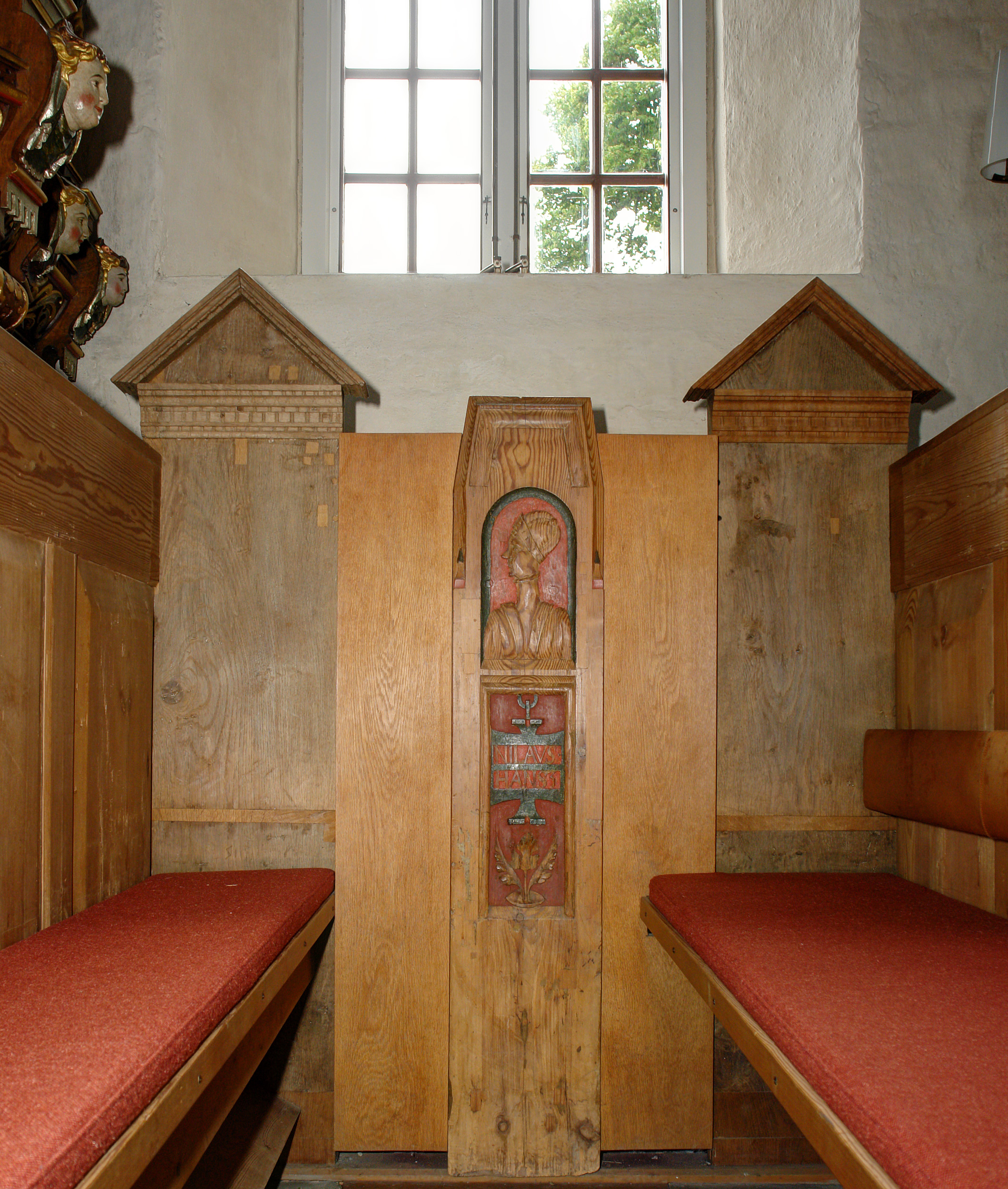
Pew (late 17th century)

== Frescoes ==
The frescoes on the vaults and arches in the nave are attributed to the workshop of the Union Master (Danish: Unionsmesteren), which was active in Zealand and Scania from in the early 15th century. It has been suggested that the Union Master is identical with the Master of Fogdö. He and his workshop decorated churches with frescoes of unusually high artistic quality. Possibly the work of foreign artists, these are of high artistic quality and appear to have been inspired by the Bohemian Master of Wittingau (c. 1380) or the Wesphalian Conrad von Soest.

The colours have almost disappeared as restoration work undertaken after the murals were uncovered in 1918 centred on cleaning the white areas, leaving the remainder untouched. They depict the Nativity (based on the vision of St Brigit of Sweden who is also shown in the scene), the Resurrection, the Ascension and the Day of Judgment. There are also images of St Stephen's birth and childhood and of the martyrdom of St Lawrence. The fresco of the Resurrection was included in the 2006 Danish Culture Canon as one of the "greatest, most important works of Denmark's cultural heritage." Further restoration of the frescoes is scheduled to begin in August 2013.

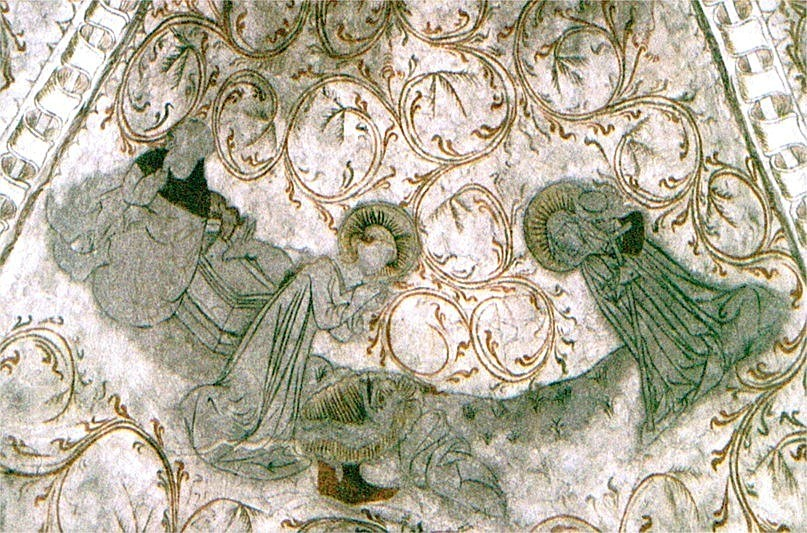
The Nativity and Brigit of Sweden

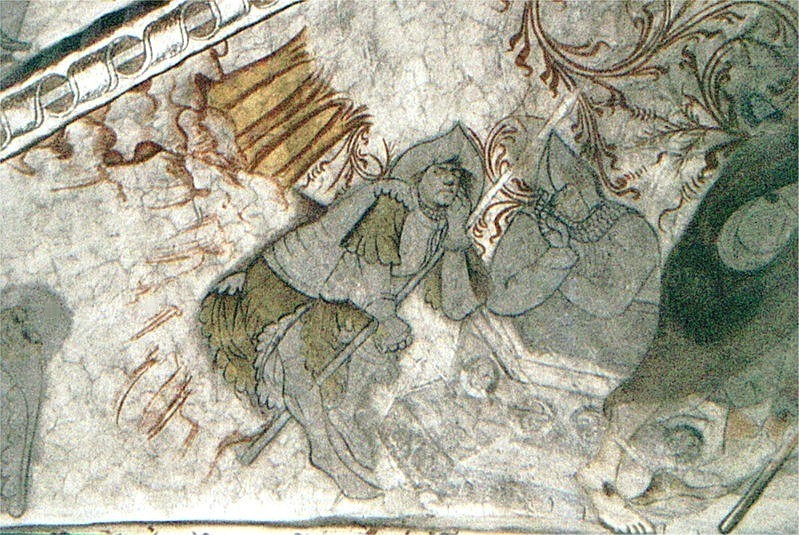
Soldier sleeping beside the grave

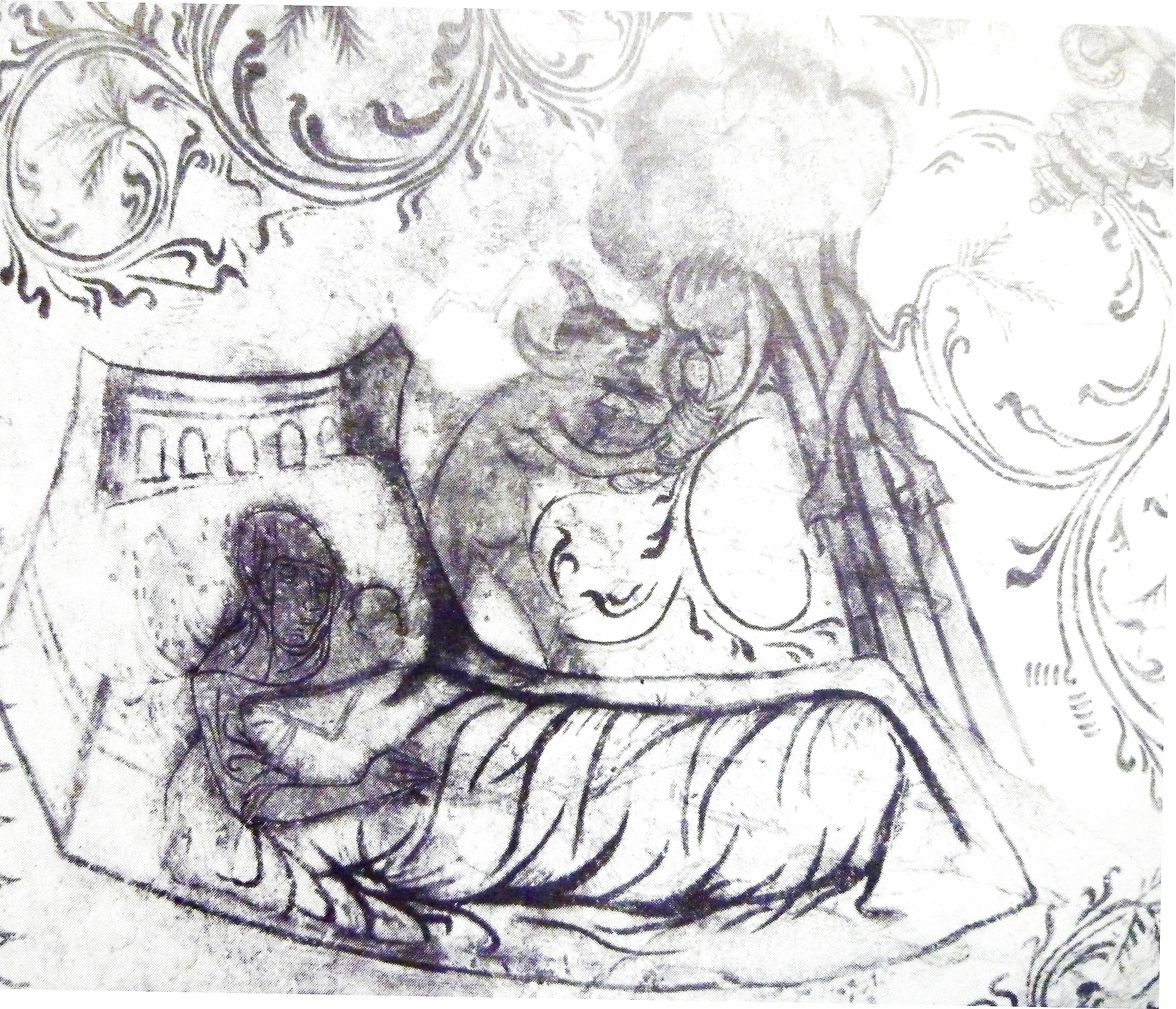
The devil with the infant Lawrence

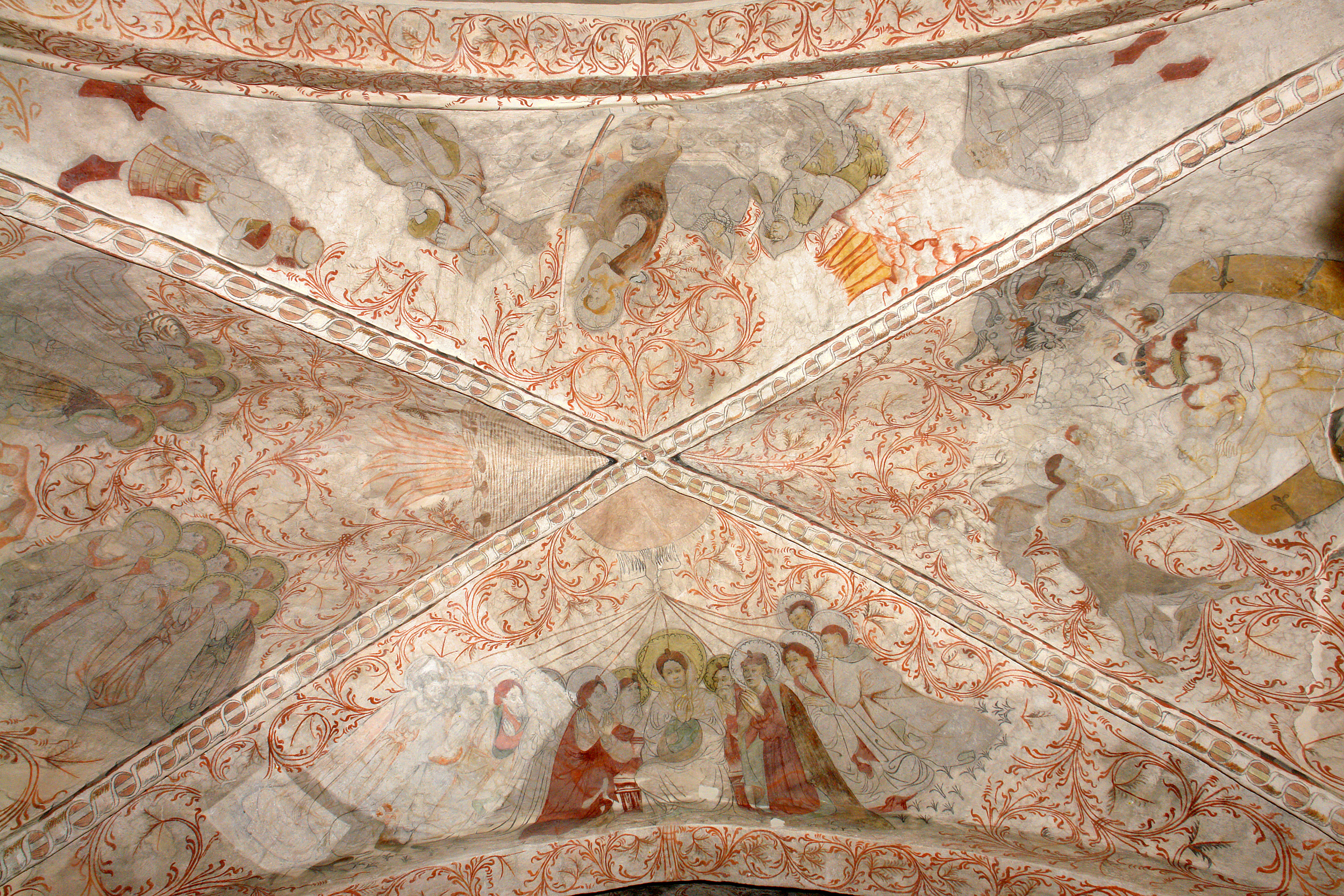
Ascension, Resurrection, Descent into hell, Holy Spirit.

== Graveyard ==
The church is surrounded by a traditional graveyard. Notable burials include politician Jacob Brønnum Scavenius Estrup (1825-1913) and the opera singer actress and journalist Helle Halding (1934-2007).
