= Union Master =

Scandinavian anonymous artist

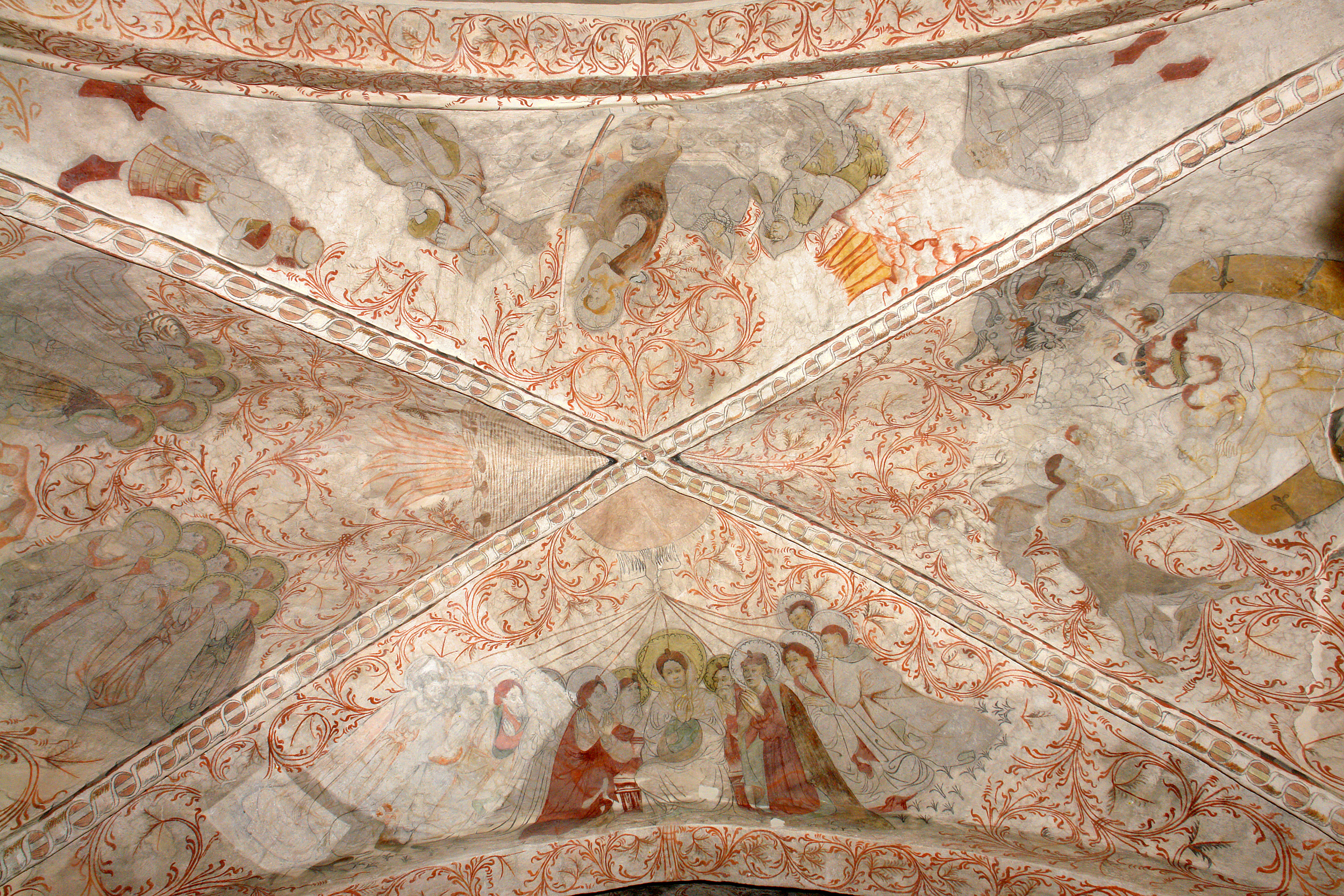
Union Master: Richly redorated vaults in Undløse Church (c. 1430)

The Union Master (Danish: Unionsmesteren), also Master of Undløse (Danish: Undløsemesteren), is the name given to an anonymous artist active in the first half of the 15th century in Denmark and possibly Sweden, which were both part of the Kalmar Union, hence the name. It has been suggested that the Union Master is identical with the Master of Fogdö. He and his workshop decorated churches with frescoes of unusually high artistic quality.

== Biography ==
The Union Master was active from c. 1410 to 1440 in Denmark and perhaps also in the south of Sweden. The frescoes in Undløse Church in northwestern Zealand depict the principal events in the life of Jesus Christ beginning with the Nativity based on the vision of St Bridget of Sweden (1303–1373) who is also shown in the scene. The childhood of St Lawrence, the patron saint of Undløse, is also presented. Grotesque figures can also be seen, probably as a warning against unseemly living. The fresco of St George and the Dragon in nearby Rørby Church is also considered to be of high artistic value. Those in Nødebo Church near Hillerød are particularly well executed, especially that of the Coronation of Mary.

The Undløse workshop is considered to have a higher artistic standard than its contemporaries. The figures are plastic, the faces specific and the costumes carefully chosen. The landscapes and buildings have perspective while shading creates emphasis. The ornamental decoration is elegant consisting primarily of a rod, encircled with a broad ribbon and a spiralled vine with twigs of spruce. The artwork appears to have been inspired by the Bohemian Master of Wittingau (c. 1380) or the Wesphalian Conrad von Soest while the artists themselves may have been foreign.

== Relationship with the Master of Fogdö ==
It has been suggested that the Union Master may also be responsible for the frescoes in Fogdö Church, Runtuna Church and in Strängnäs Cathedral in Sweden. It has also been suggested that this is another artist, sometimes called the Master of Fogdö (Swedish: Fogdömästaren). To some extent the attribution of works to individual artists or workshops of this age will remain uncertain and a case for further research. However, according to Signums svenska konsthistoria, a comprehensive art history of Sweden, artistic details uncovered in Rørby Church in Denmark in 1981 convincingly display similarities strong enough to rule out that the Swedish and the Danish frescoes are by different artists. The Master of Fogdö would thus be identical with the Union Master. The name Union Master originates from the political unification between Denmark and Sweden at the time.

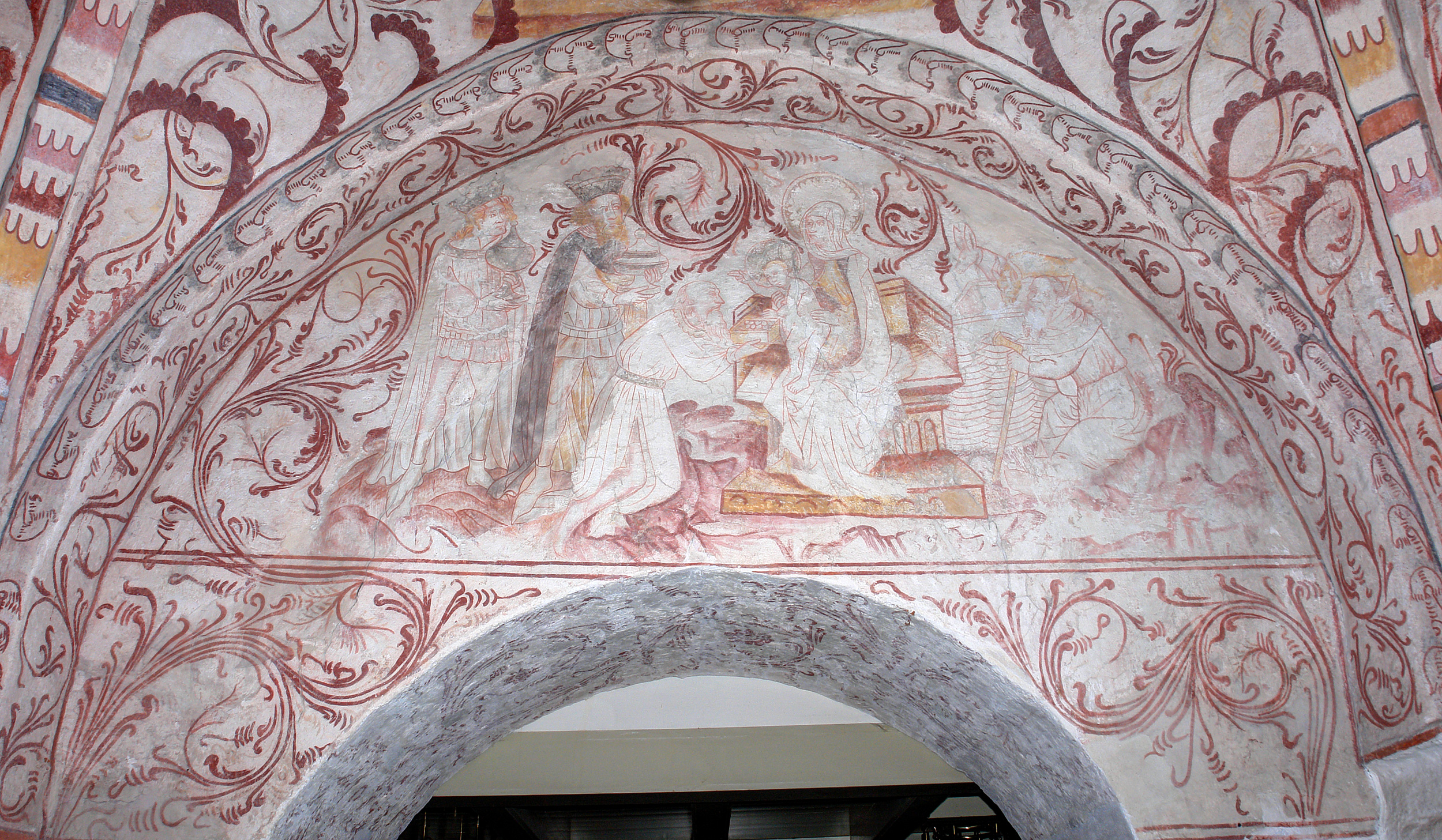
Adoration of the Magi, Nødebo

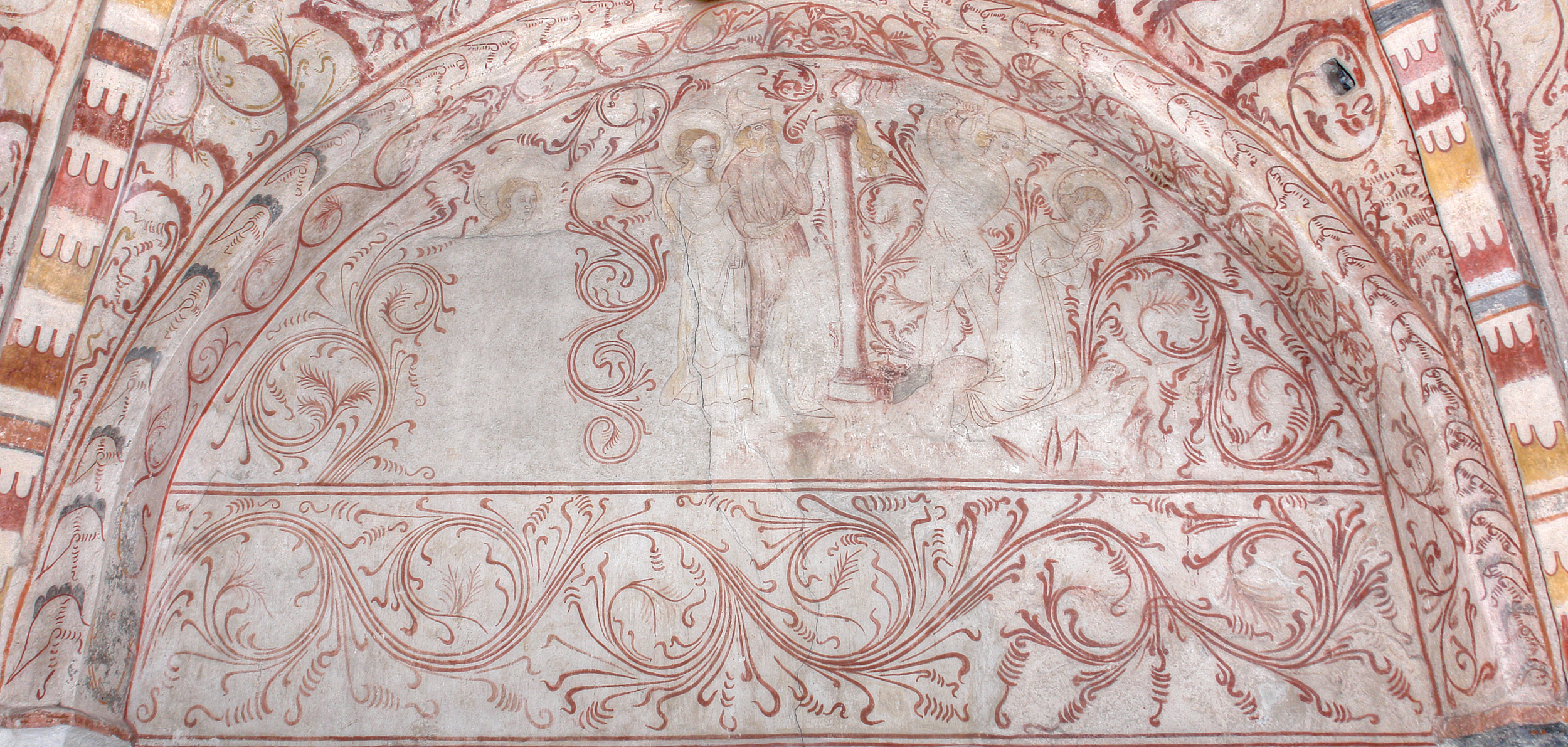
Execution of Joan of Arc, Nødebo

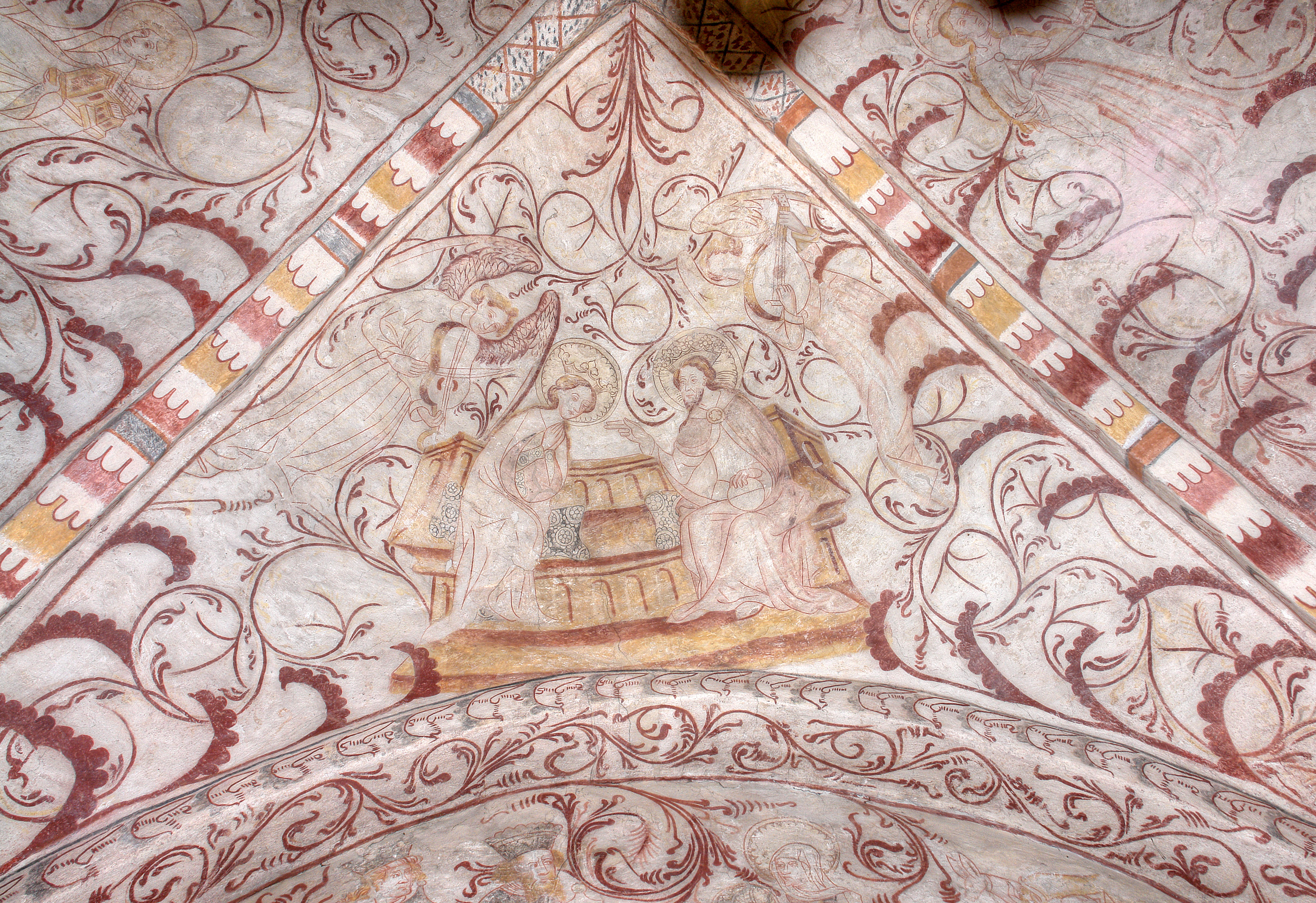
Coronation of Mary, Nødebo

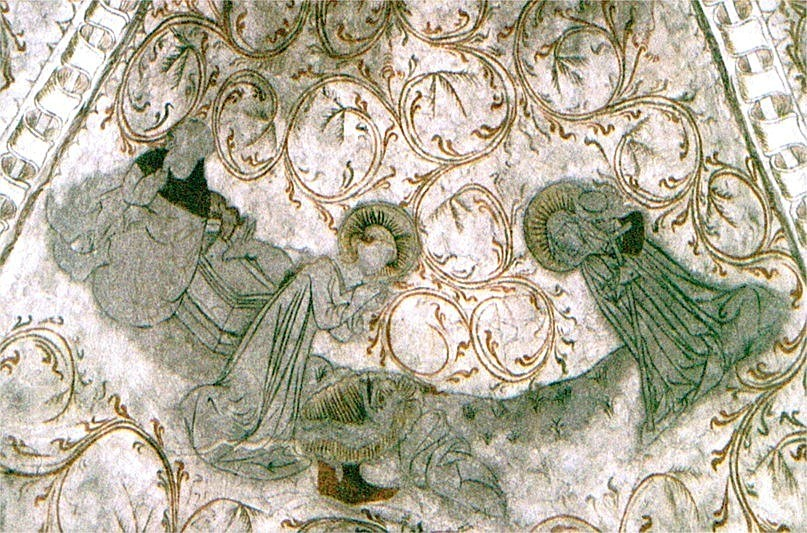
The Nativity and Brigit of Sweden, Undløse

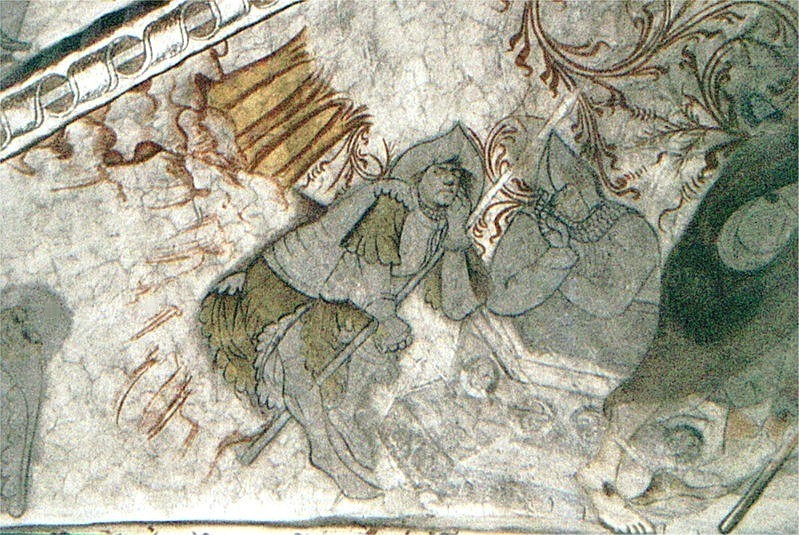
Soldier sleeping beside the grave, Undløse

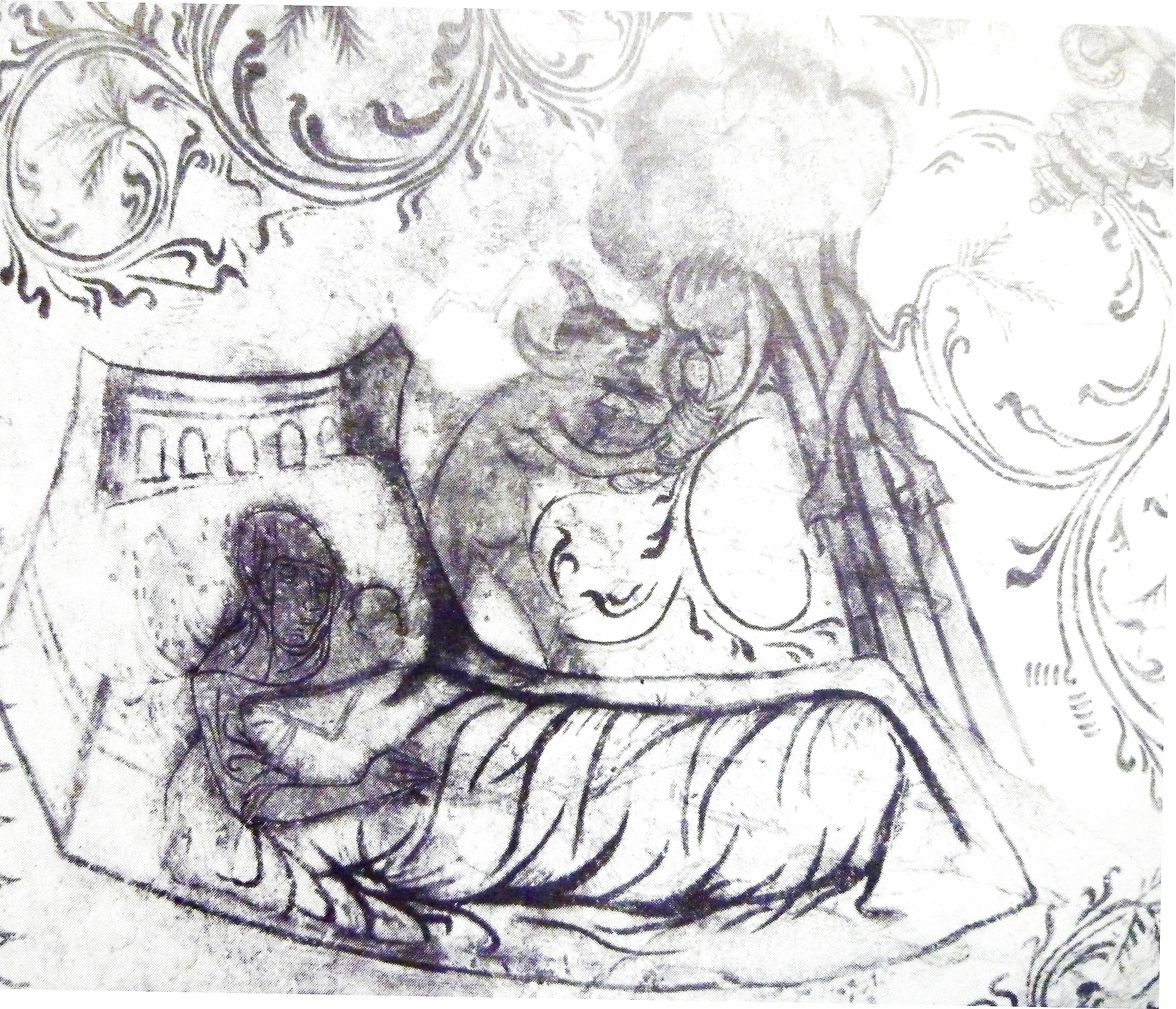
The devil with the infant Lawrence, Undløse

== See also ==
- Church frescoes in Denmark
- Master of Fogdö
