= Johannes Østrup =

Danish philologist and professor

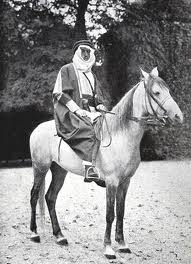
Johannes Østrup, famous for riding from the Middle East to Denmark in 1893

Johannes Elith Østrup (27 July 1867 – 5 May 1938) was a Danish philologist and professor at the University of Copenhagen where he served as rector from 1934 to 1935. In 1893, after a study tour in the Middle East, he rode on horseback back to Copenhagen, crossing much of Asia Minor and continental Europe.

== Early life and education ==
Born in Copenhagen, Østrup was the son of farmer Hans Frederik Østrup. In 1890, he matriculated from Copenhagen's Metropolitan School (Metropolitanskolen) in Greek, Latin and Danish. In his own time, he had also read works on Sanskrit by the leading philologists of the day and had studied A.F. van Mehren's literature on Semitic languages. While still a student, in 1889 he published a collection of translations titled Arabiske Sange og Eventyr (Arabic Songs and Fairy Tales). When 24, he became the youngest student ever to receive a doctorate as a result of his Studier over Tusind og en Nat (Studies of A Thousand and One Nights).

== Field studies in the Middle East ==
During the years 1891–1893, Østrup made a study trip to Egypt and Syria under primitive conditions, visiting the as yet little known Aneza Bedouin tribe. He rode an Arabian stallion some 4,500 km (2,800 mi) through Egypt, Syria and Asia Minor and back to Denmark. His travels, including his 60-day return from Istanbul to Copenhagen on horseback in August 1893, are vividly described in his Skiftende Horizonter (Changing Horizons, 1894). The trips represented an important stage in his development, not only as he was able to assimilate modern Turkish language and the Arabic dialects of Egypt and Syria but above all because he became fully adapted to the Middle Eastern way of life, showing special interest in local customs and traditions rather than just in language. He openly admitted he far preferred field trips to library-based research.

Crossing through much of the Ottoman Empire along his way, Østrup met with several Young Turk politicians and leaders. In his memoirs, Østrup recounts his meeting with Talat Pasha in the autumn of 1910, one of the main perpetrators of the Armenian genocide of 1915. According to Østrup, during such meetings, Talat talked openly about his plans to "exterminate" the Armenians.

== Academic career ==
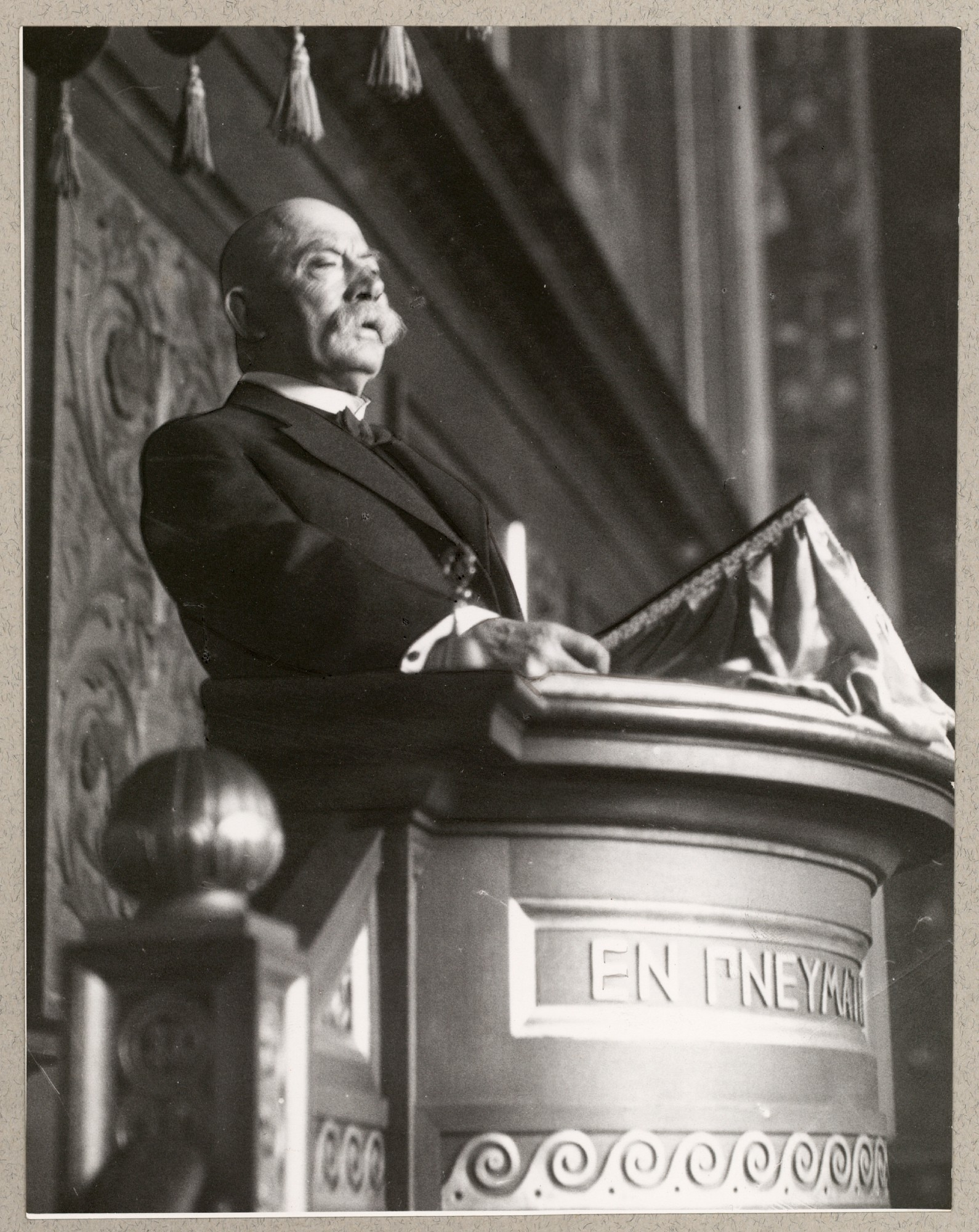
Østrup delivering a speech in the solemnity hall of the University of Copenhagen

In 1898, Østrup attempted to obtain van Mehren's professorship at the University of Copenhagen but was unsuccessful, apparently owing to his preference for modern Arabic dialects rather than the traditionally taught classical idiom. He became a lecturer on Semitic language and literature until 1918 when an extraordinary professorship in Islamic culture was created for him. Based on his own travels, he was able to teach the modern spoken dialects of Arabic and Ottoman Turkish. In 1934, he was appointed rector of Copenhagen University. His principal works include Contes de Damas (1897), a collection of Syrian folktales; the first translation directly into Danish of One Thousand and One Nights (Tusind og een Nats Æventyr, 1928) and Arabiens Historie (History of Arabia, 1933).

== Heidelberg visit ==
Despite his early elitist orientations, Østrup showed no sympathy for antisemitism or for German national socialism in the 1930s. When on an official visit to Heidelberg in 1936, he refused to give the Nazi salute and avoided speaking German to his hosts. Instead he gave his address in Latin, the traditional language of academics, praising the achievements of the university and commenting on the illustrious Danes who had benefited from its curriculum. Exchanges with his hosts, however, cast some doubt as to how many of them had followed his presentation as they appeared mainly interested in discussing how National Socialism had combated Bolshevism.

== Later life ==
Østrup was interested in Arabic coins. He spent several years cataloguing the large collection found in Terslev (Zealand) in 1911. The results were published posthumously in Catalogue des monnaies Arabes et Turques du Cabinet Royal des Médailles du Musée National de Copenhague (1938). Østrup was elevated to Commander of the Dannebrog, 2nd grade, in 1935. He died in Copenhagen on 5 May 1938 and is buried in Nødebo Cemetery.

== See also ==
- Witnesses and testimonies of the Armenian genocide

== Bibliography ==
- Bæk Simonsen, Jørgen (2004). Islam med danske øjne - Danskeres syn på islam gennem 1000 år. Saxo. ISBN 9788750039990.
- Østrup, Johannes (1938). Erindringer. H. Hirsch-sprungs forlag.
- Østrup, Johannes (1894). Skiftende horizonter: Skildringer og iagttagelser fra et ridt gennem örkenen og Lille-Asien. Gyldendalske boghandels forlag.
