= Undløse =

- Parish and village
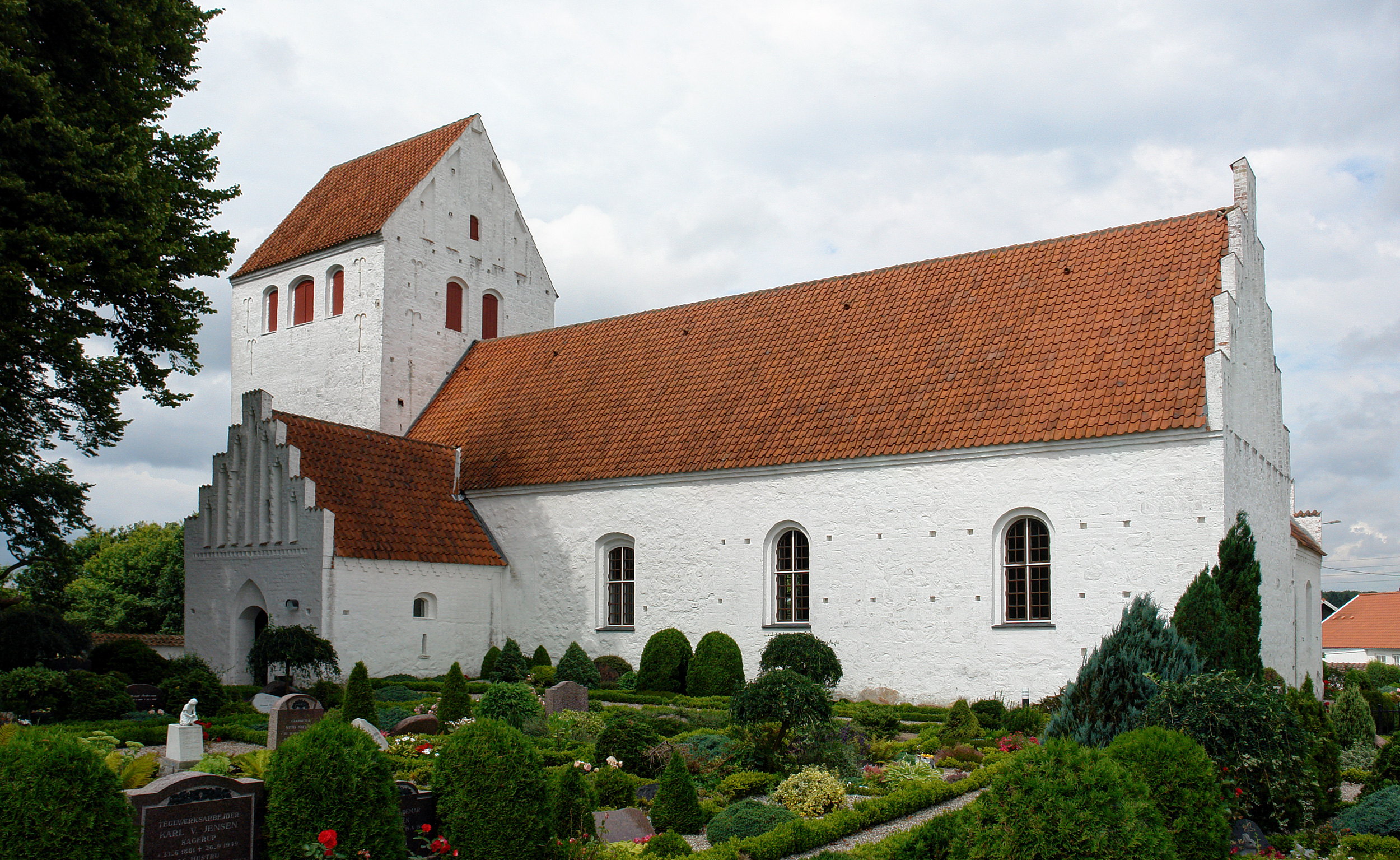
- Undløse Church

- Parish location in Holbæk municipality

- Location in Denmark Undløse (Denmark Region Zealand)
- Coordinates: 55°36′N 11°35′E
- Country: Denmark
- Region: Zealand (Sjælland)
- Municipality: Holbæk

Area
  - Urban: 0.36 sq mi (0.94 km^{2})

Population (2026)
  - Urban: 1,105
  - Urban density: 3,000/sq mi (1,200/km^{2})
- Time zone: UTC+1 (CET)
  - Summer (DST): UTC+2 (CEST)

Undløse is the main village of Undløse Parish, located about 17 kilometres (11 mi) southwest of Holbæk in Holbæk municipality in northwestern Zealand, Denmark. As of 1 January 2026, it has a population of 1,105. Undløse Church has Baroque woodcuts by Abel Schrøder and notable 15th-century frescoes.

== History ==
Undløse Church was built in the Romanesque style at the end of the 12th century. It was enlarged in the early 16th century with Gothic additions.

The manor of Kongsdal with a history dating back to the 12th century lies in the northwestern part of Undløse and has had considerable influence on the development of the community. Today's manor house was built in 1598 by Peder Redtz.

A sacred spring known as Hellig Kors Kilde (Spring of the Holy Cross) is located next to Kildegården. From the Middle Ages until well into the 19th century, it attracted pilgrims to the village especially in connection with the midsummer festival on 23 June known as Sankthansaften. A market was held each year the following day north of the church.

== The village today ==
While most of those living in the village commute to the Copenhagen area, Undløse still has a few small local businesses, mainly in the areas of agriculture, gardening, automobile repair and construction. There is a food store, a pizzeria and a kiosk. The village has a large day nursery and a primary school. There are also facilities for sports, meetings and community activities.
