= Jacob van Utrecht =

Early Renaissance painter

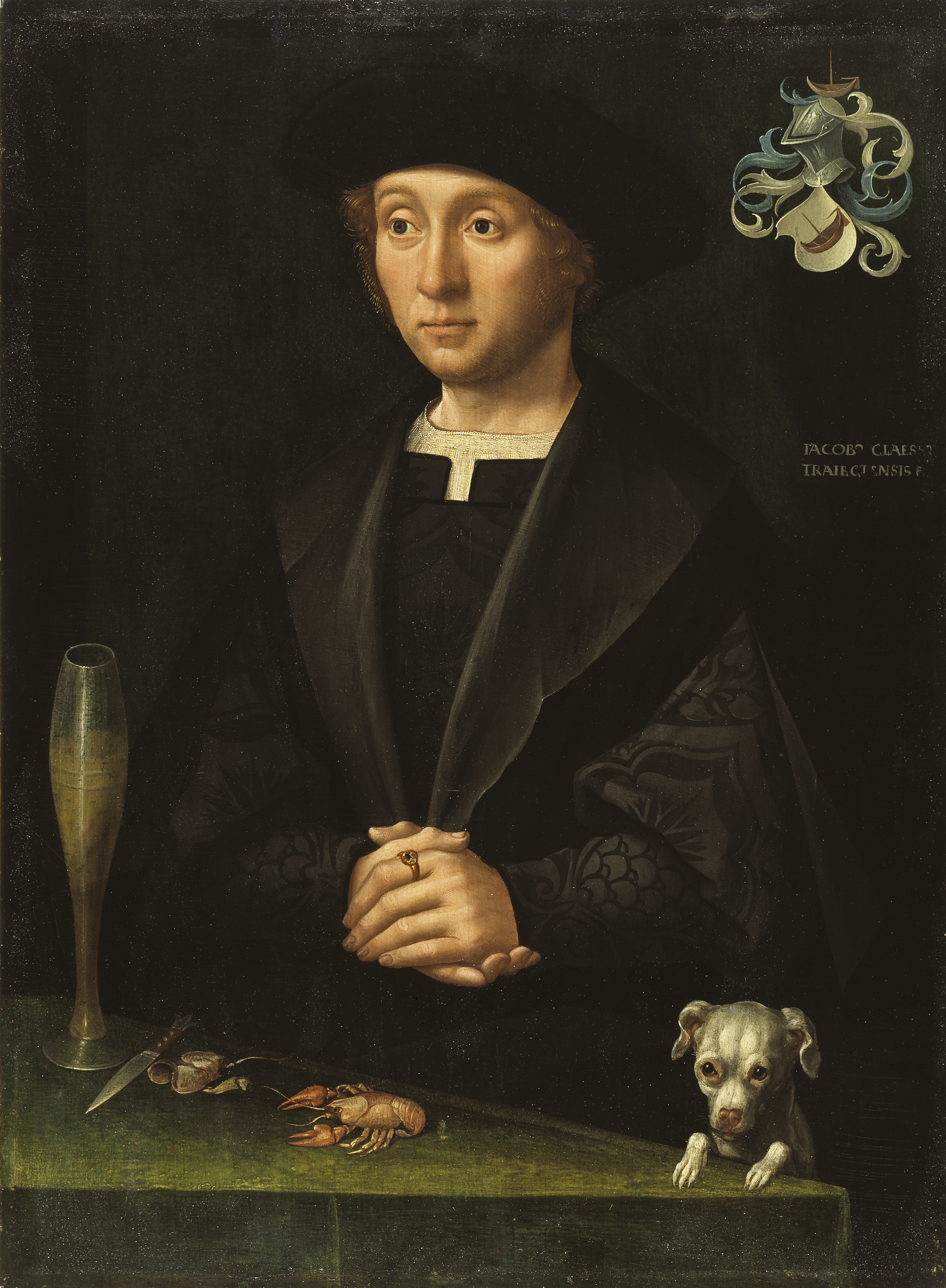
Painting "Member of the Alardes family", by Jacob Claesz van Utrecht. National Museum, Stockholm.

Jacob Claesz van Utrecht, also named by his signature Jacobus Traiectensis (c. 1479 – after 1525) was a Flemish early Renaissance painter who worked in Antwerp and Lübeck.

== Life ==
Few details are known of Jacob van Utrecht's life. Research on this artist did not start before the end of 19th century. He was probably born in Utrecht, although it is not certain. It is assumed that he became a citizen of Antwerp around 1500 and he is recorded as a "free master craftsman" of the Guild of St Luke there from 1506 to 1512.

From 1519 to 1525 he is recorded as a member of the Leonardsbruderschaft ("Leonard's Brotherhood"), a religious confraternity of merchants in Lübeck among whose ranks the leaders of the Protestant Reformation in the 1530s could be found.

From then on no traces of his life have been found.

== Signature ==
In addition to Jacobus Traiectensis he also signed his artworks with his real surname Claesz / Claez.

== Works ==
- Berlin altar (1513), Gemäldegalerie in Berlin
- Cologne altarpiece (1515), for the Great St. Martin Church in Cologne, now in the Wallraf-Richartz Museum
- Triptych (1520) for Lübeck merchant, Hinrich Kerckring, St. Annen Museum in Lübeck
- Portrait of a young Lady from Lübeck (c. 1520), Louvre, Paris
- Portrait of a man with a little dog (c. 1520), Swedish National Museum of Fine Arts, Stockholm
- Portrait Johann Wigerick (1522), Herdringen Palace near Arnsberg (Sauerland)
- Portrait of a man writing a letter (1524), Gemäldegalerie, Berlin
- Portrait of a man with rings (1524), Hermitage Museum, St. Petersburg, Russia
- Crucifixion altar (ca. 1525), in Nødebo in the north of Zealand, Denmark
- Trinity altar (1525) for St. Mary's Church in Lübeck, lost in World War II bomb raid
- Annunciation altar with portraits of donating Lübeck merchant Hermann Plönnies and his wife, formerly in the Reedtz-Thott Collection at Gavnø Castle on the isle of Gavnø near Næstved on southern Zealand, since 2012 in the St. Annen Museum in Lübeck
