= Nødebo Church =

Coordinates: 55°58′34″N 12°20′46″E

- Nødebo Kirke
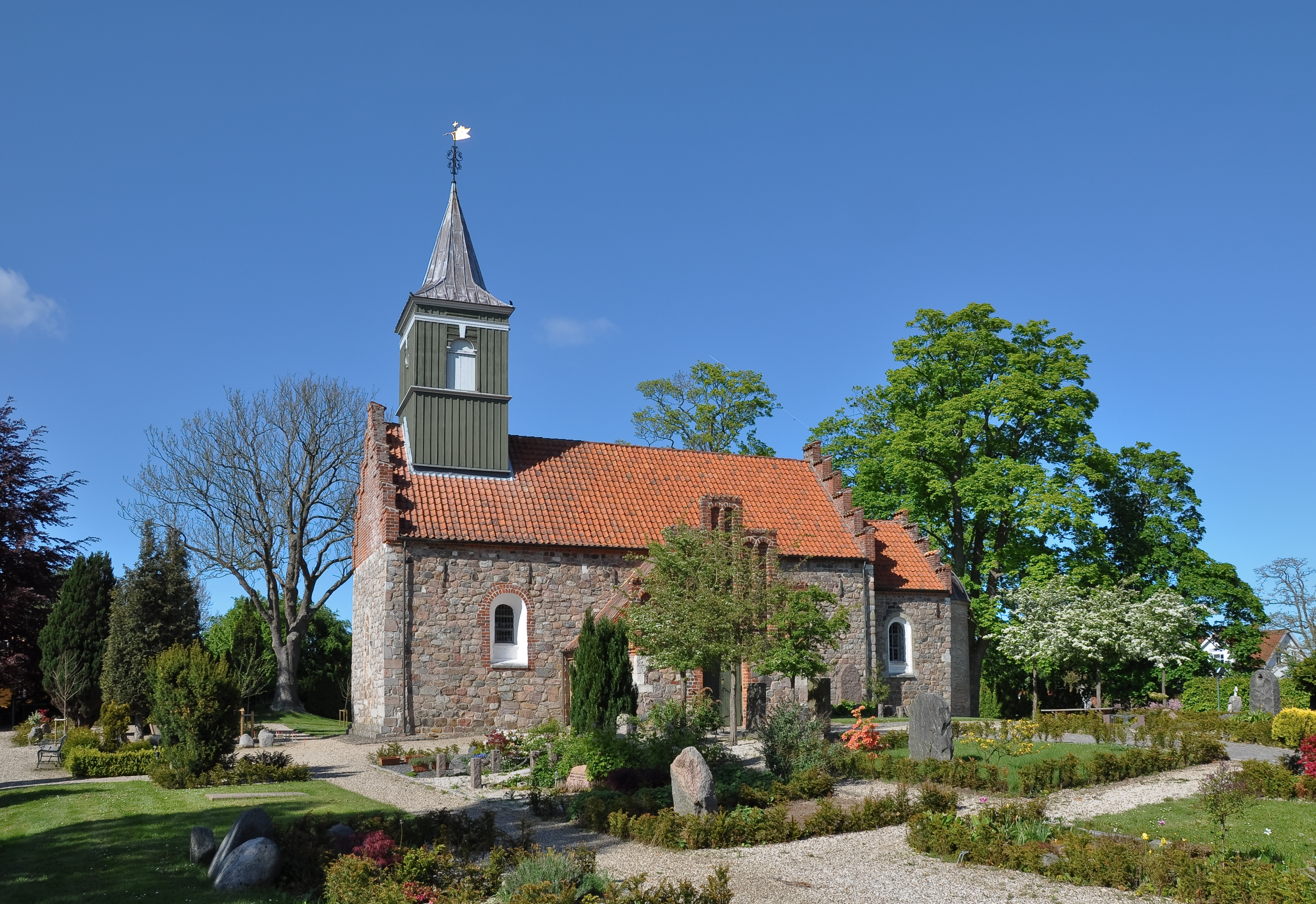
- Nødebo Church
- Location: Nødebo, Hillerød Municipality, Denmark
- Denomination: Church of Denmark

Architecture
- Architectural type: Romanesque style
- Years built: 13th century

Administration
- Diocese: Diocese of Helsingør
- Parish: Nødebo Sogn

Nødebo Church (Danish: Nødebo Kirke) is located in Nødebo in the northern part of the Danish island of Zealand. It is situated on the south-western shore of Lake Esrum, 5 km north of Hillerød and 40 km north of Copenhagen. The church is known for its church frescos and its early 16th century altarpiece.

== History ==
Originally a pilgrimage church, it was built in the 13th century in the Romanesque style at the site of a holy spring dedicated to Mary Magdalene. Around 1400, the church was furnished with vaults and extended to the west. The dimensions of the walls indicate that a tower may also have been planned for but it was never built. Instead, a flèche was added in 1739 as a replacement of a free-standing bell tower.

Nødebo Parish was annexed to Esbønderup Parish until 1907. In 1903 it was given its own chaplain and in 1907 was established as an independent parish which also included Gadevang Church which had been consecrated in 1904 in the neighbourting community of Gadevang.

== Church frescos ==
Nødebo Church is famous for its church frescos, the oldest of which, found on the triumphal wall, date back to late-Romanesque times. The vaults of the two bays of the nave and the choir are covered in paintings from 1425 while the tower bay is decorated with paintings by the so-called Union Master.

The frescos present various scenes from the Biblia pauperum, including Adam and Eve working surrounded by 14 children, the presentation of Christ in front of Pilate and other scenes from the Pilate, and Marian coronation.

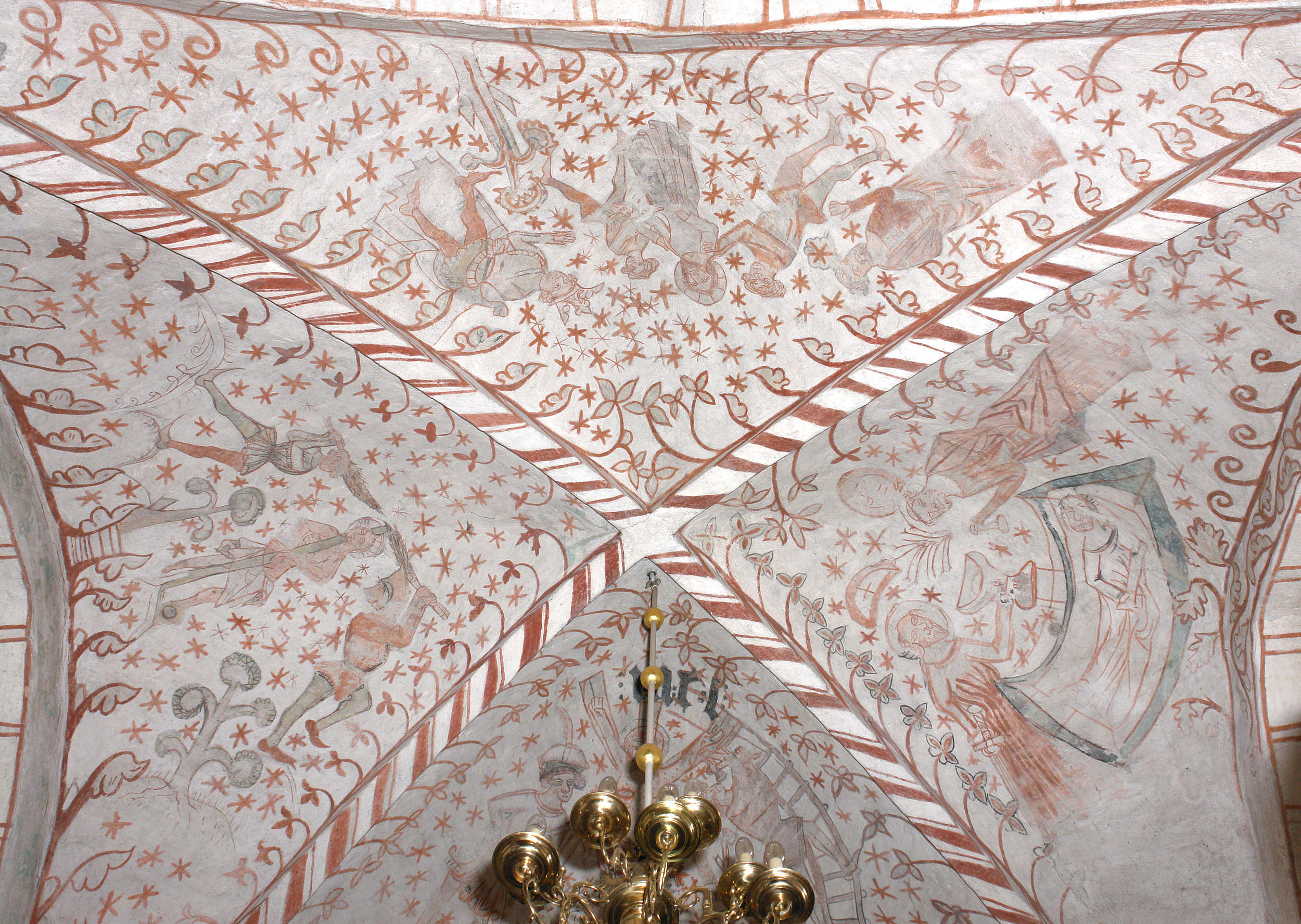

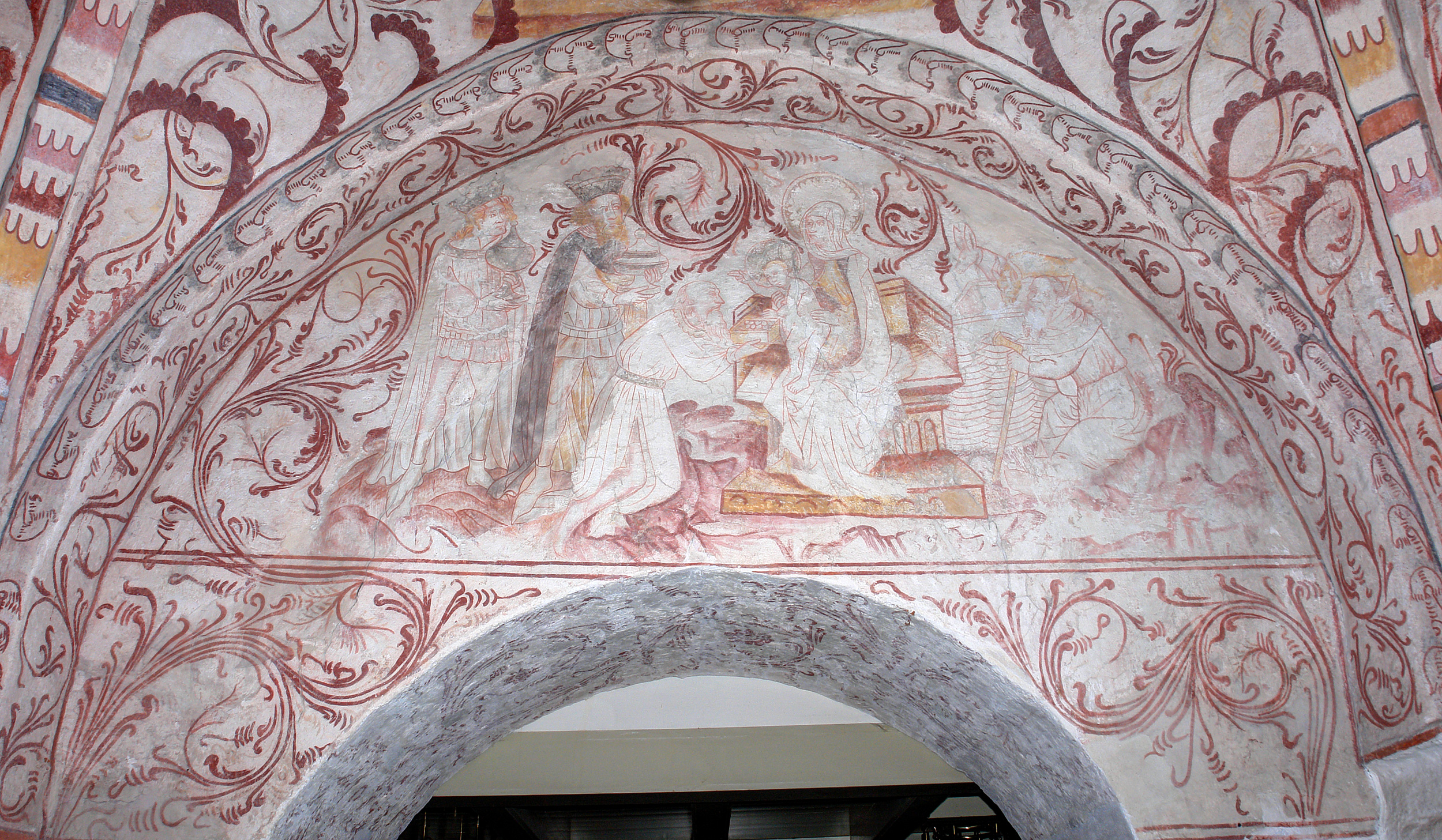

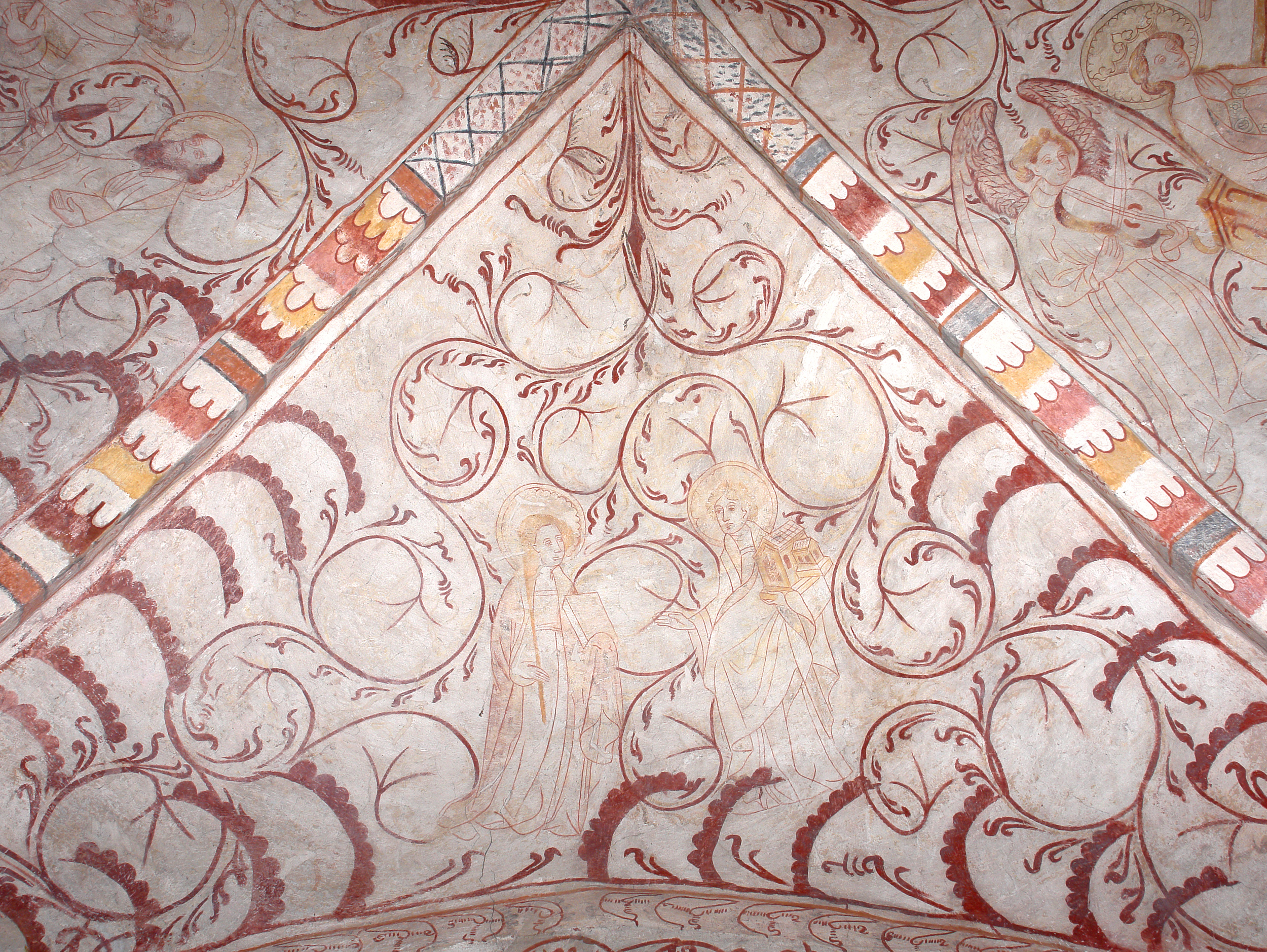

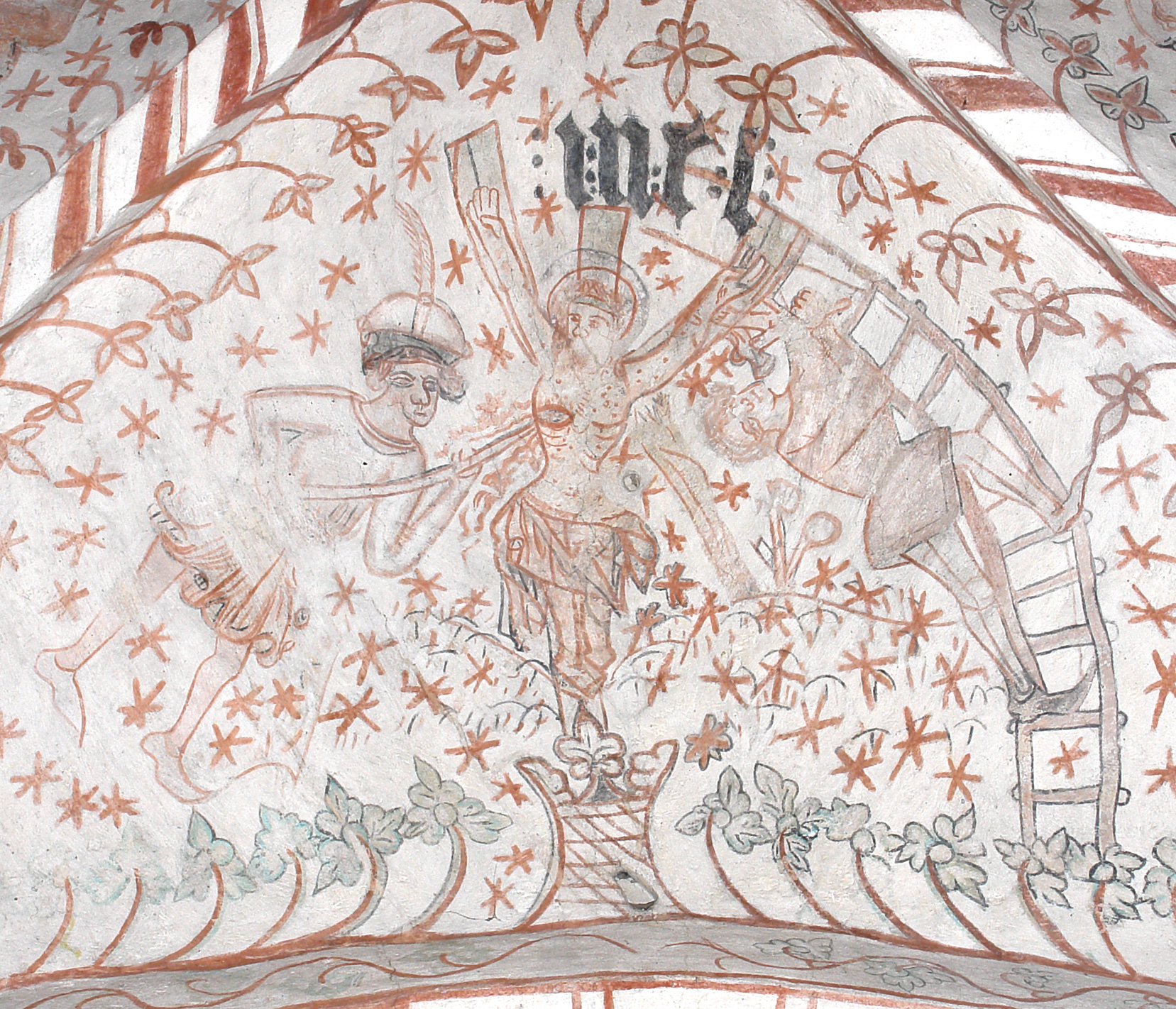

== Furnishings ==
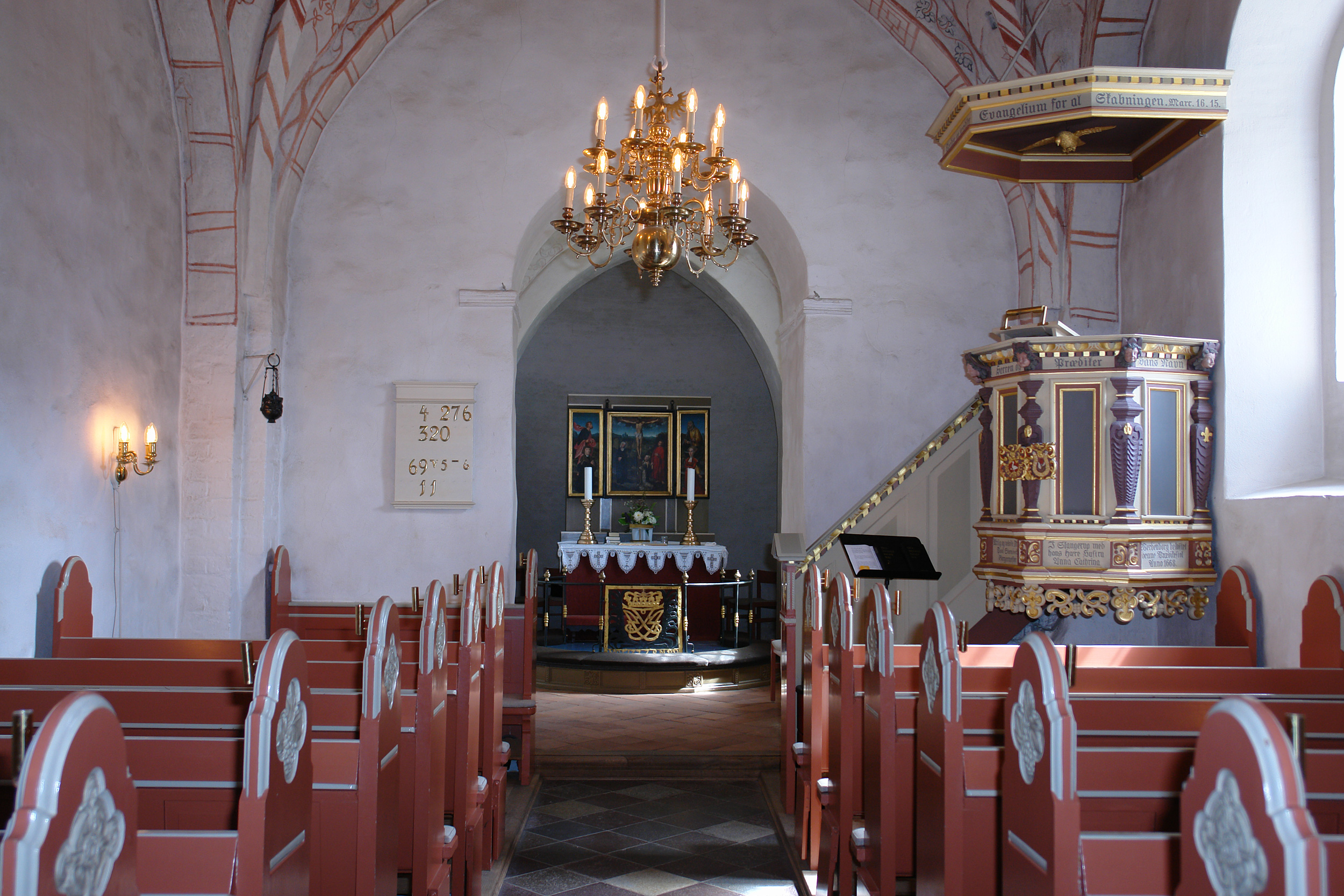
Nødebo Church interior

The pulpit is from 1668 and executed in the Baroque style by Esben Børresen from Slangerup. According to an inscription on its base, it was a donation from the honest and wise man Paul Steenbech, Mayor of Slangerup". Its present is an addition from 1748.

The altarpiece was painted in the beginning of the 16th century in the Netherlands and has previously been located in a church in Elsinore. It is a triptych depicting the Calvary scene with the crucified Christ surrounded by ary, ohn and Mary Magdalene. Adriaen Isenbrandt and Jacob van Utrecht have been suggested as the possible artists.

The font is from Romanesque times. It is carved in a single Trapezoid piece of granite which was probably originally the capital of a column.

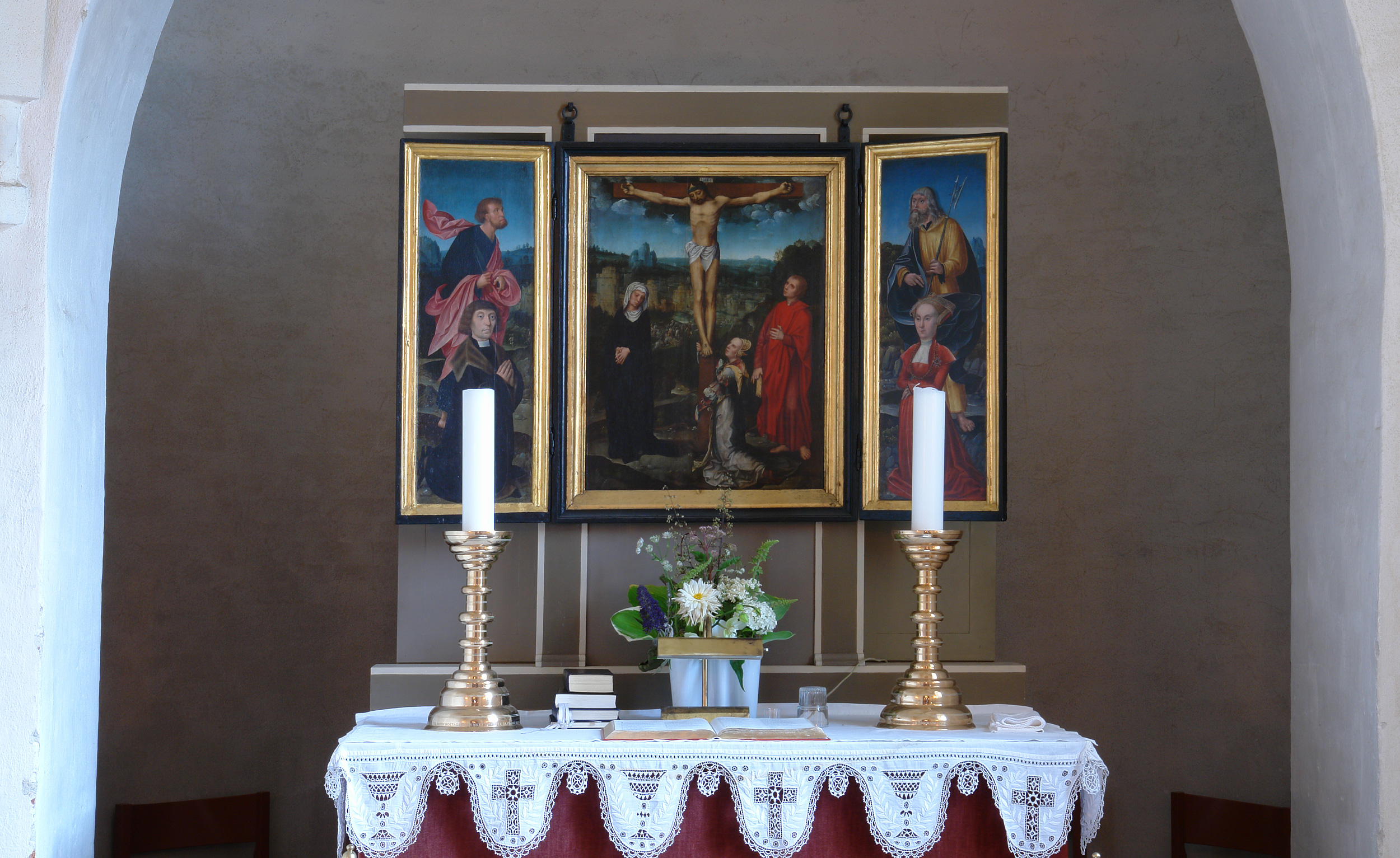
Altar

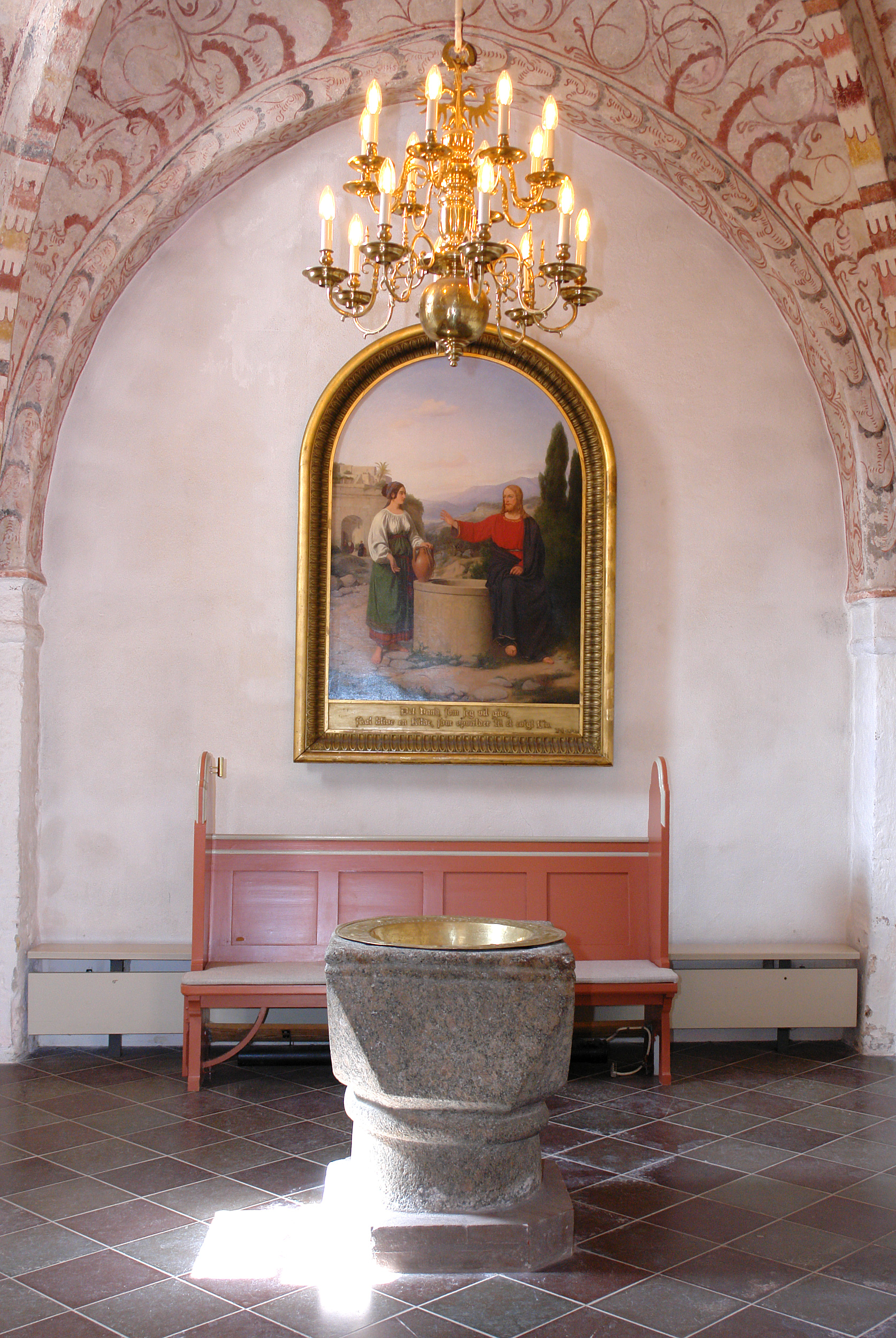
Baptismal font

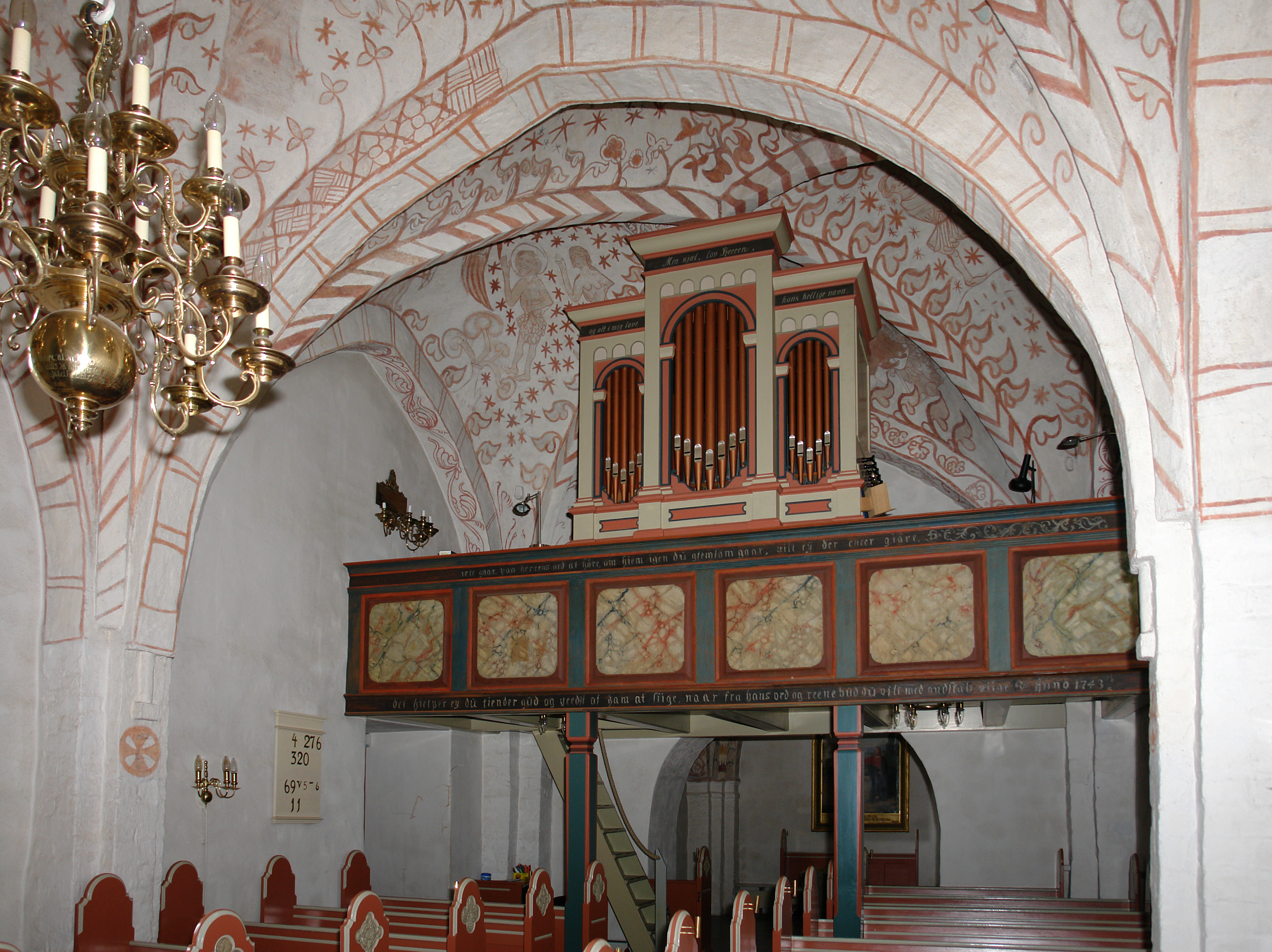
Organ at the rear of the nave

== Cemetery ==
Notable burials at the church include:

- William Sophus Dahl (1842–1910), merchant
- V. Falbe-Hansen (1841–1932), politician and economist
- Aage Fredenslund (1941–1995), professor
- Anna Lundqvist (1888–1976), painter
- Carl Lundqvist (1883–1949), architect
- Axel Østrup (1989–1967), artist and architect

== Gallery ==
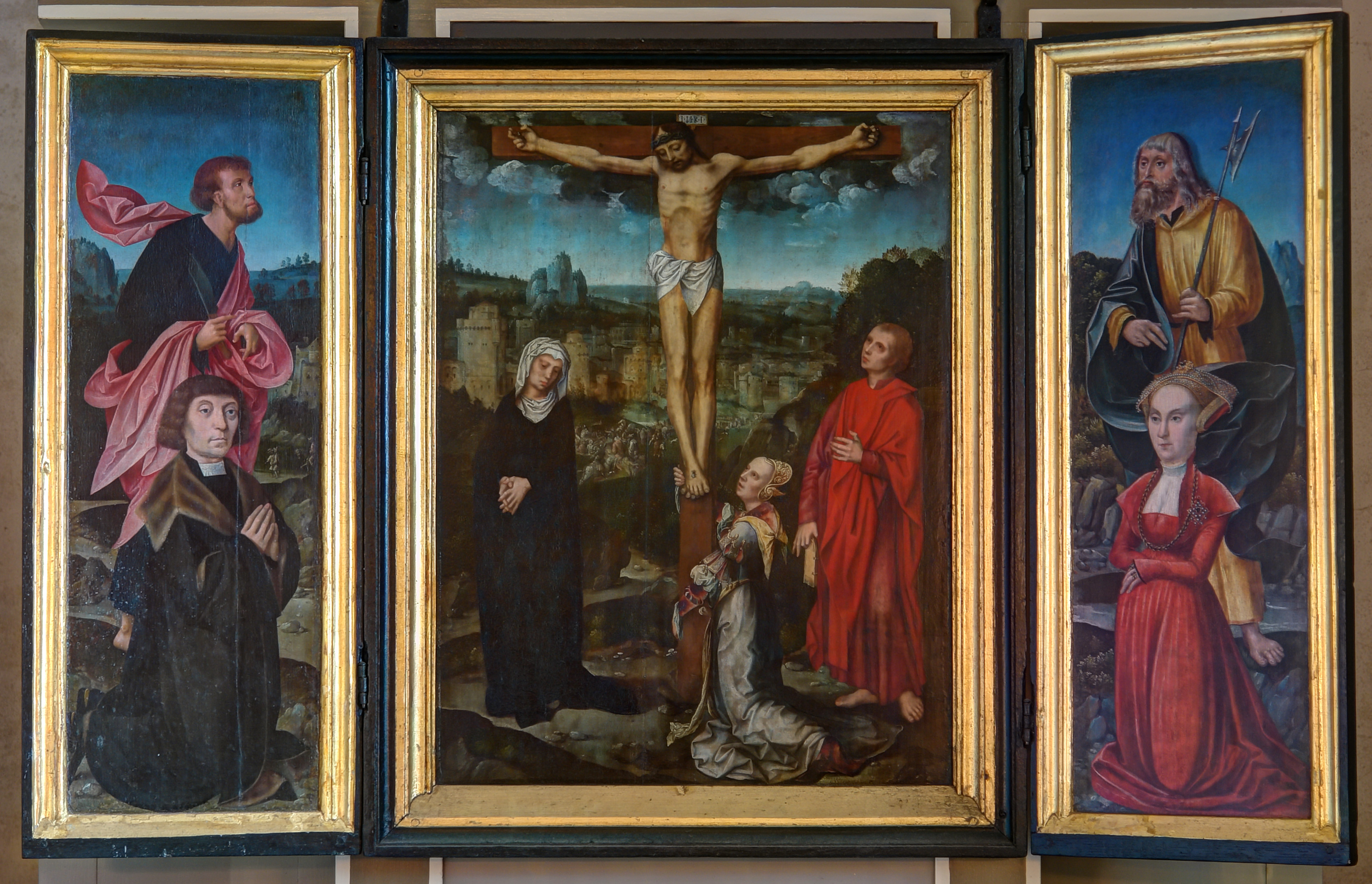
Altarpiece

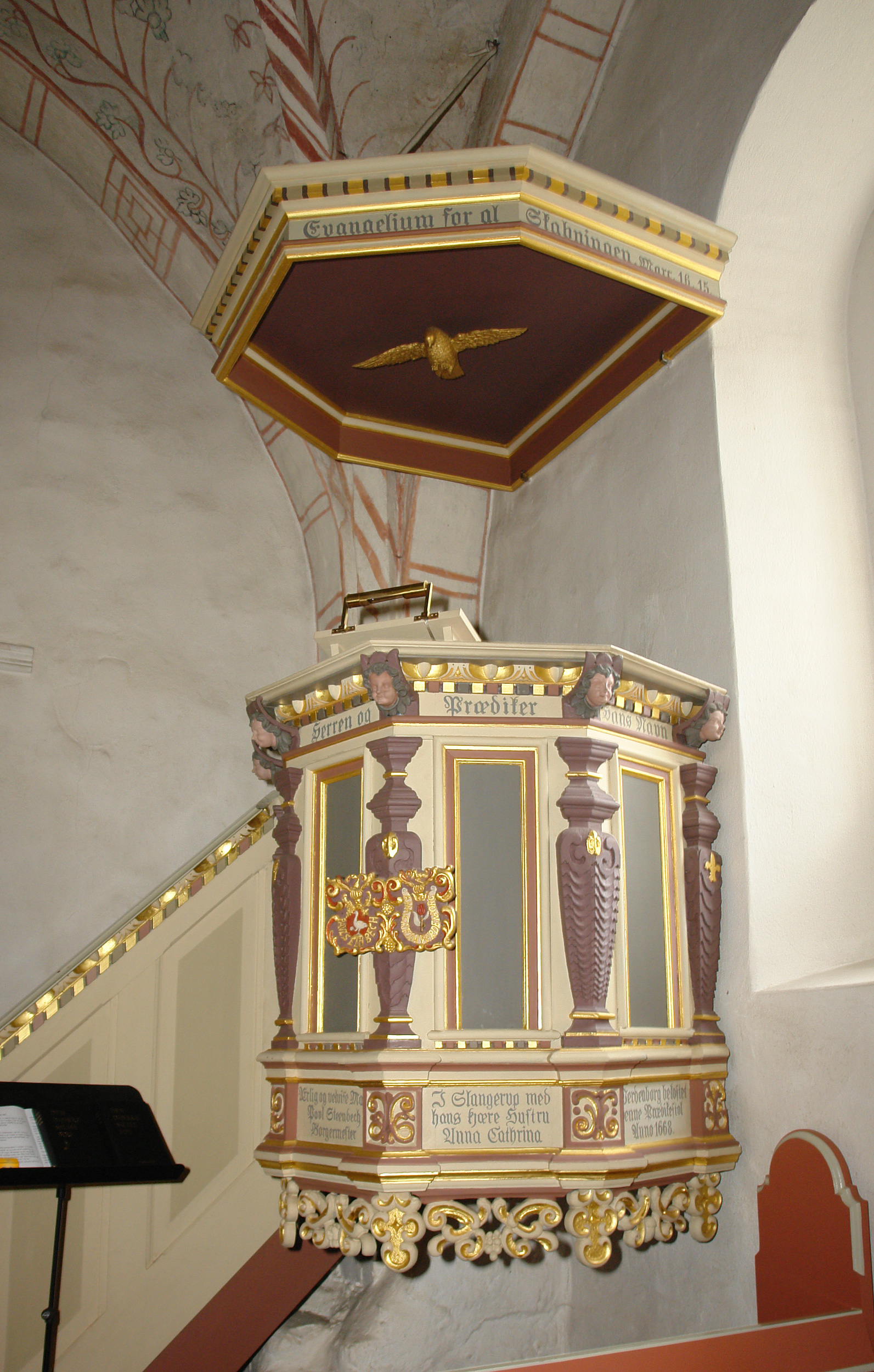
Pulpit

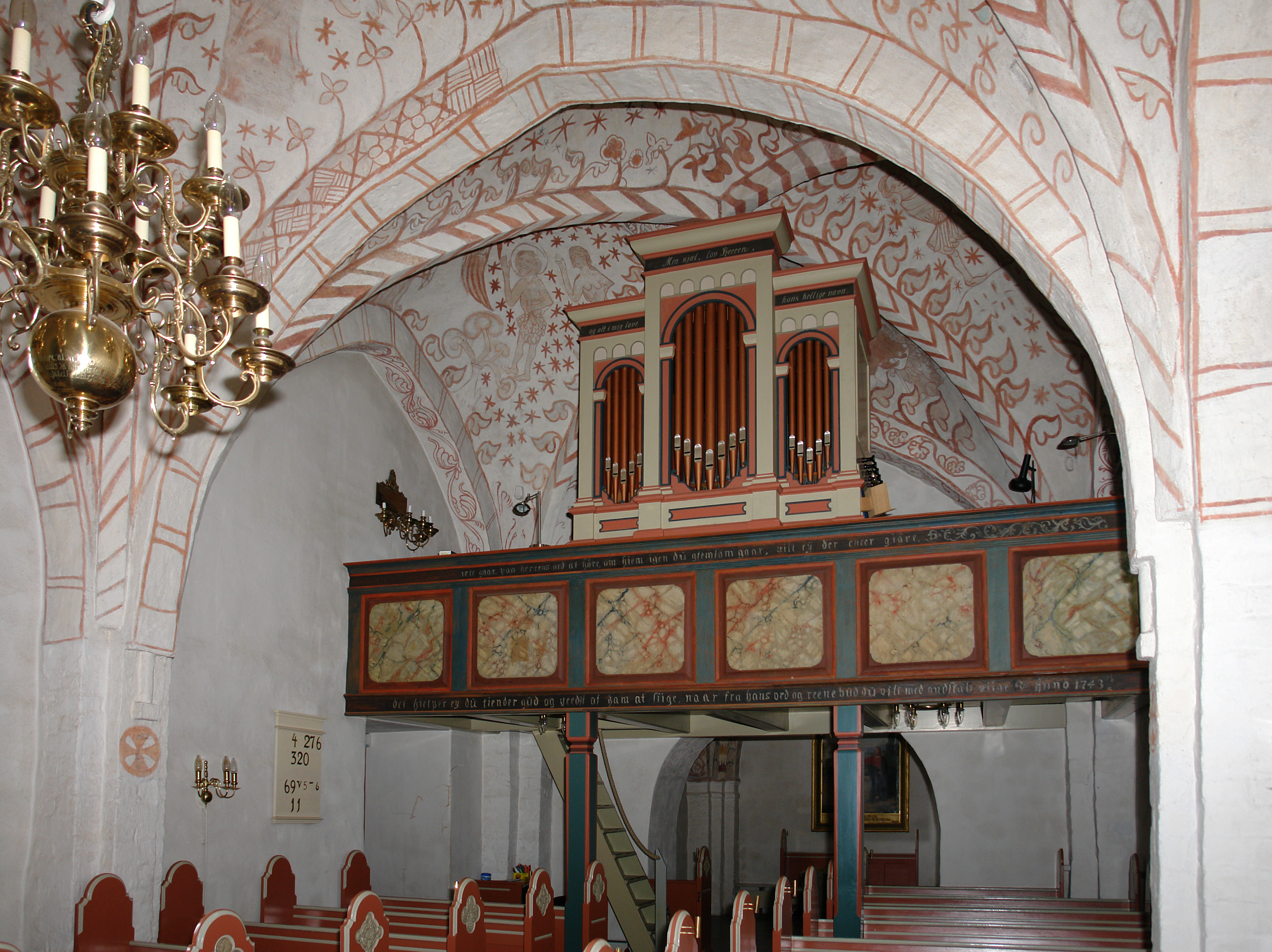
Organ

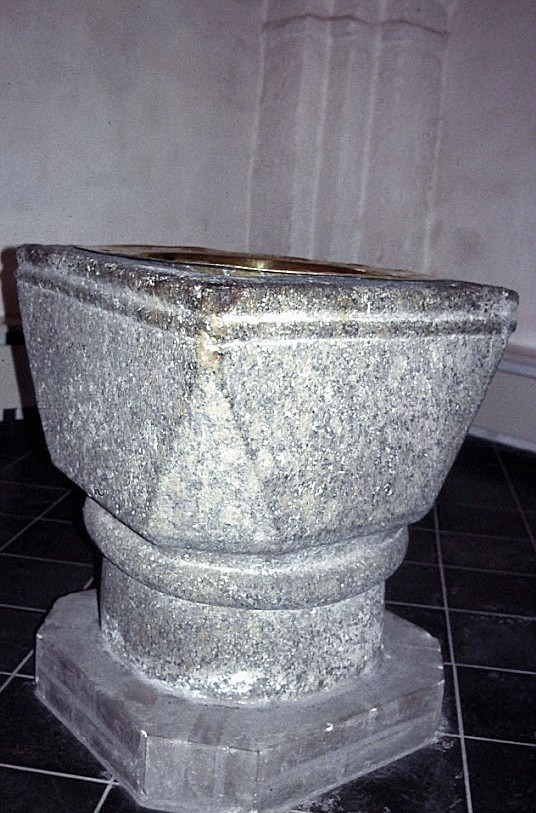
Baptismal

== See also ==
- Church frescos in Denmark
- Asminderød Church
