= List of churches in Gribskov Municipality =

This list of churches in Gribskov Municipality lists church buildings in Gribskov Municipality, Denmark.

== List ==
Name	Location	Year	Coordinates	Image	Refs
Annisse Church	Annisse	1175	55°58′56.1″N 12°10′14.6″E		
Blistrup Church	Blistrup	c. 1140	56°05′8.6″N 12°12′12.8″E		
Esbønderup Church	Esbønderup	12th century	56°03′9.7″N 12°20′37.3″E		
Gilleleje Church	Gilleleje	1538	56°07′23.4″N 12°18′37.34″E		
Græsted Church	Græsted	c. 1200	56°03′59.4″N 12°16′48″E		
Helsinge Church	Helsinge	12th century	56°01′25.3″N 12°11′50.5″E		
Mårum Church	Mårum	12th century	56°01′30.3″N 12°16′47″E		
Ramløse Church	Ramløse	12th century	55°0′57.4″N 12°06′41.4″E		
Smidstrup Church	Smidstrup	1988	55°07′8.4″N 12°14′17.6″E		
Søborg Church	Søborg	c. 1140	56°05′10.77″N 12°19′3.62″E		
Tibirke Church	Tibirke	c. 1120	56°02′29.92″N 12°06′23.84″E		
Valby Church	Valby	c. 1100	56°03′51.4″N 12°08′27″E		
Vejby Church	Vejby	c. 1100	56°03′51.4″N 12°8′27″E		
Villingerød Church	Villingerød	1906	56°04′55.8″N 12°23′16.1″E		

== See also ==
- Listed buildings in Gribskov Municipality
- List of churches in Helsingør Municipality
- List of churches in Fredensborg Municipality
