= Vejby railway station =

Railway station in North Zealand, Denmark

Vejby
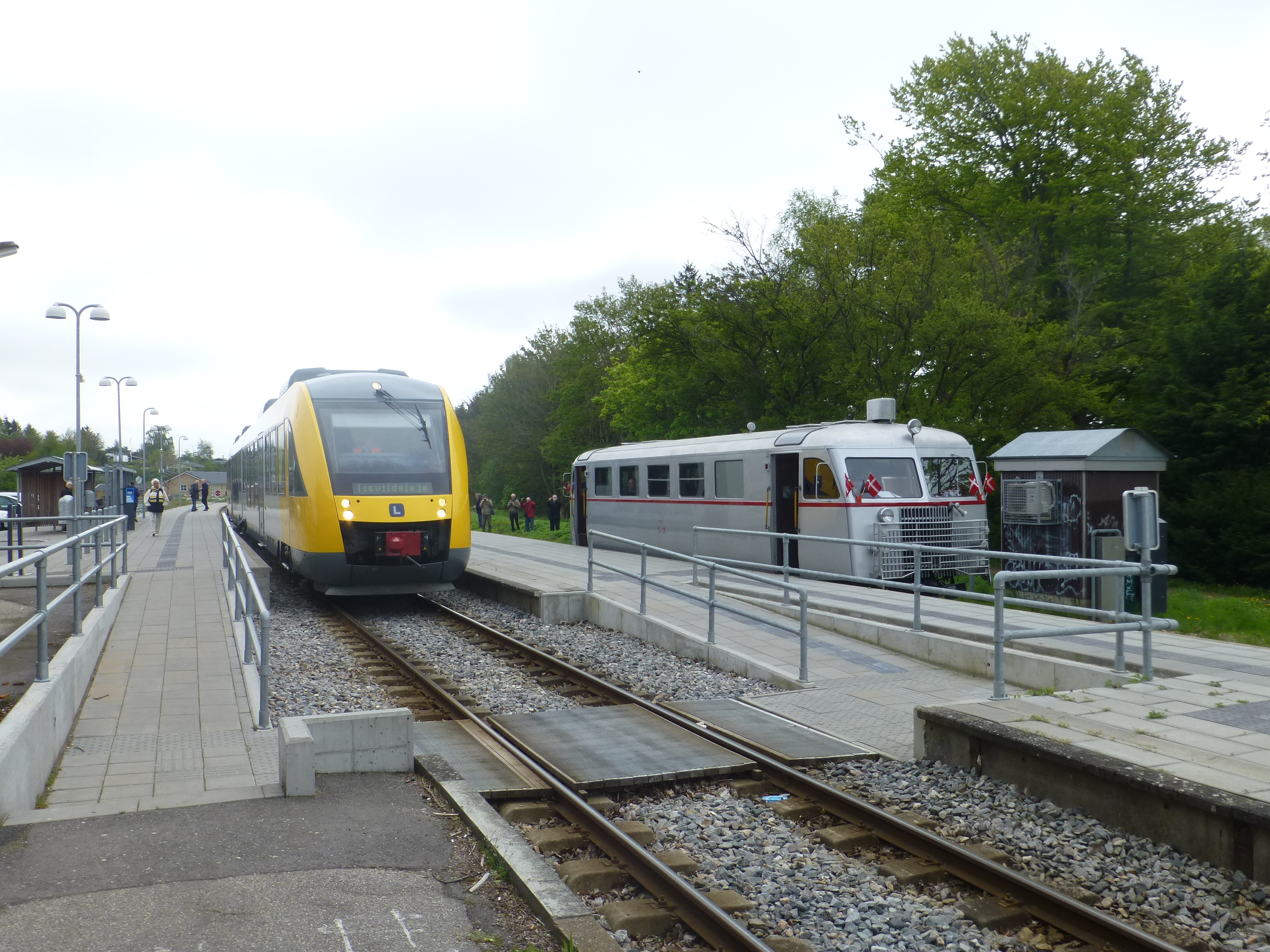
- Railcar and heritage railcar at Vejby station in 2015

General information
- Location: Stationsvej 30; 3210 Vejby, Gribskov Municipality; Gribskov Municipality; Denmark
- Coordinates: 56°03′45.66″N 12°8′9.76″E
- Elevation: 15.8 metres (52 ft)
- Operator: Lokaltog
- Line: Gribskov Line
- Platforms: 2
- Tracks: 2

History
- Opened: 18 July 1924

Services
Preceding station	Lokaltog	Following station
Holløse towards Tisvildeleje	Gribskov Line Tisvildeleje branch	Ørby towards Hillerød
Location
- Location within Denmark

Vejby railway station (Danish: Vejby Station) is a railway station serving the village of Vejby, Gribskov Municipality in North Zealand, Denmark. The station is located in the southwestern part of the village, a short distance from Vejby Church.

The railway station is located on the Tisvildeleje branch of the Gribskov railway line from Hillerød to Tisvildeleje. It opened in 1924 with the opening of the Helsinge–Tisvildeleje section of the Gribskov line. The train services are currently operated by the railway company Lokaltog which runs frequent local train services between Hillerød and Tisvildeleje.

== Gallery ==
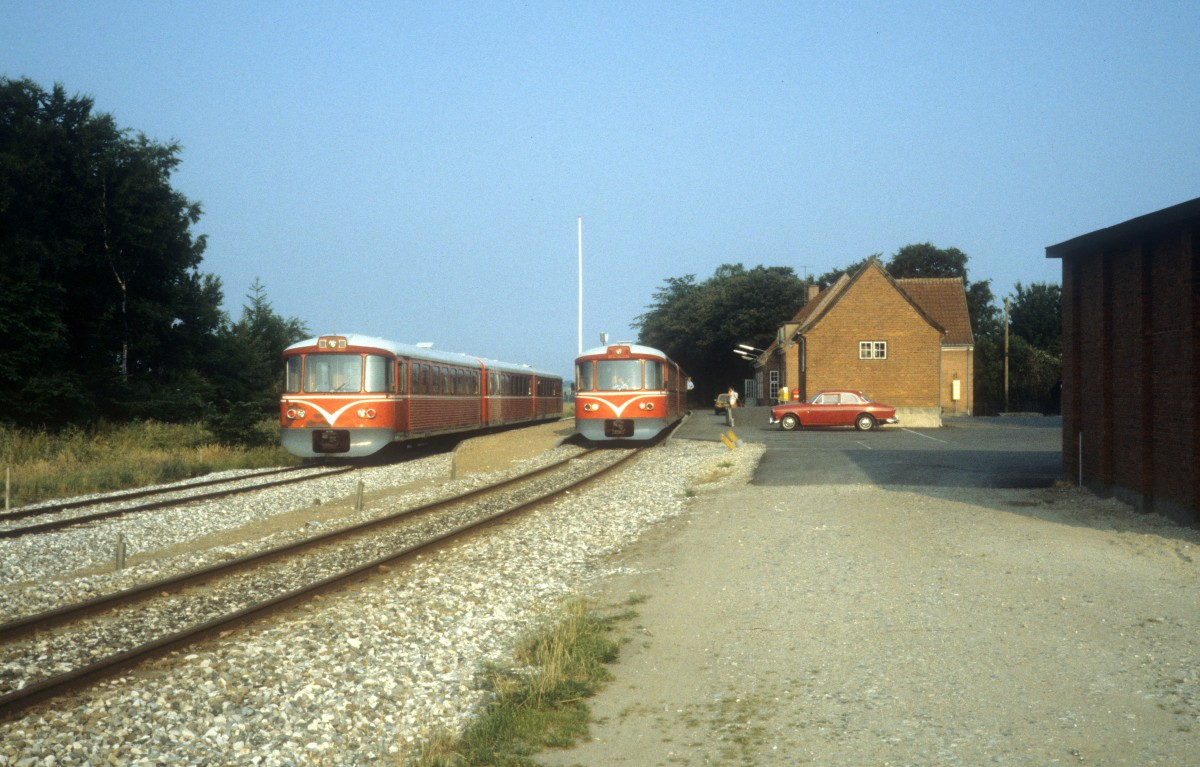
Vejby station in 1983

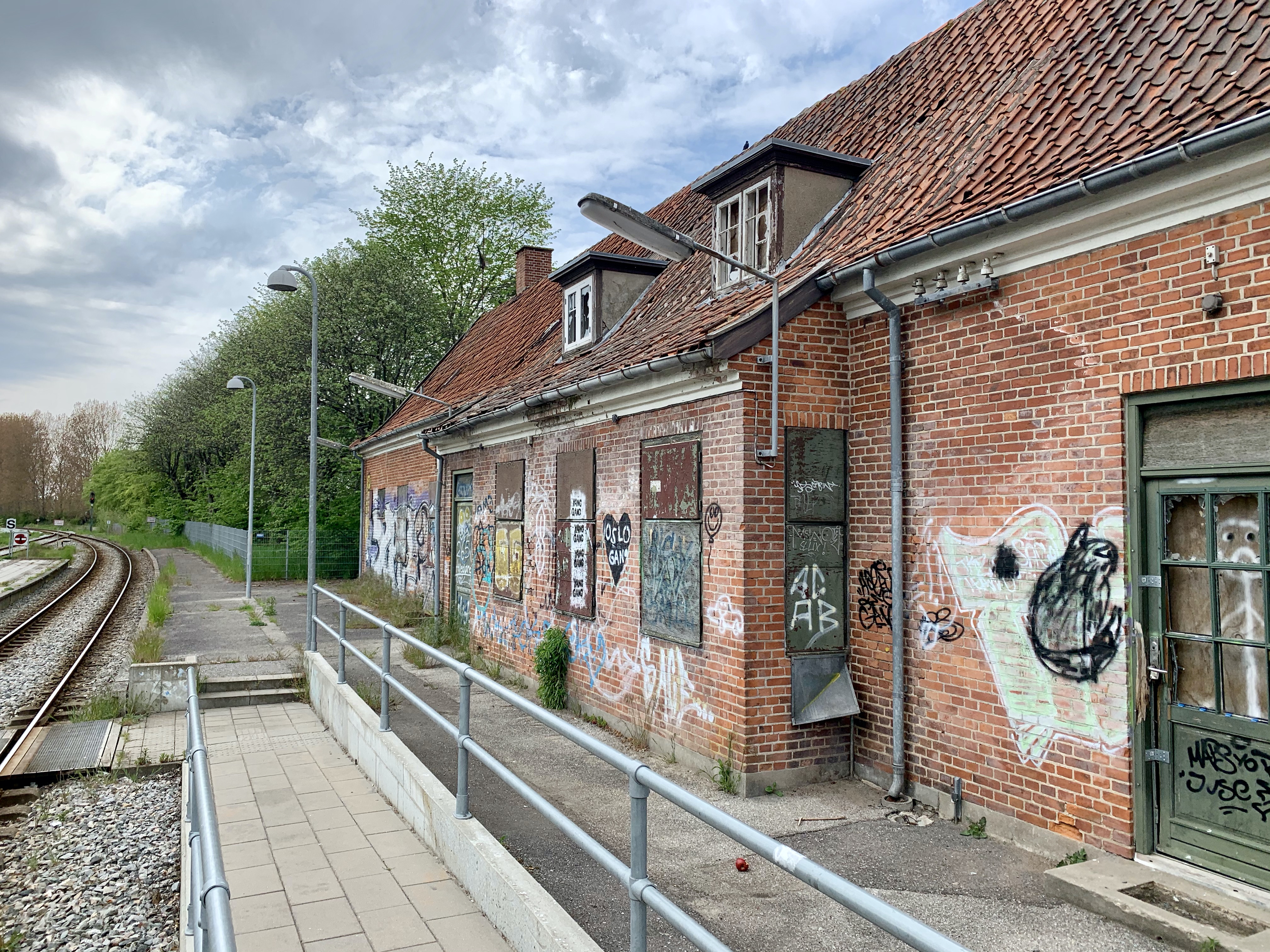
The station building in 2020

== See also ==
- List of railway stations in Denmark
- Rail transport in Denmark
- Transport in Denmark
