= List of shipwrecks in February 1887 =

The list of shipwrecks in February 1887 includes ships sunk, foundered, grounded, or otherwise lost during February 1887.

== 1 February ==
List of shipwrecks: 1 February 1887
Ship	State	Description
Beresford	United Kingdom	The steamship ran aground on the Haisborough Sands, in the North Sea off the coast of Norfolk and was severely damaged. She was on a voyage from Middlesbrough, Yorkshire to Bombay, India. She was refloated on 5 February with the assistance of four tugs and taken in to Great Yarmouth, Norfolk.
Hermes	United Kingdom	The brigantine foundered off Île Vierge, Finistère, France.
Paul	United Kingdom	The steamship was driven ashore on Amager, Denmark. She was on a voyage from Libava, Courland Governorate to London.

== 4 February ==
List of shipwrecks: 4 February 1887
Ship	State	Description
Finland	(Russian Empire) Grand Duchy of Finland	The ship departed from Darien, Georgia, United States for the English Channel. No further trace, reported missing.

== 7 February ==
List of shipwrecks: 7 February 1887
Ship	State	Description
Fanny Atkinson	Flag unknown	The ship caught fire off the Dry Tortugas. She was on a voyage from Apalachicola, Florida, United States to Belfast, County Antrim, United Kingdom.

== 9 February ==
List of shipwrecks: 9 February 1887
Ship	State	Description
Emma	United Kingdom	The ketch collided with the Thames barge Ocean Queen (United Kingdom) and sank off Harwich, Essex. Emma was on a voyage from London to Newcastle upon Tyne, Northumberland.
Gus	United Kingdom	The barge was being towed by the tug Scotia (United Kingdom) when she collided with the steamship Emma (United Kingdom) and sank at Deptford, Kent.

== 10 February ==
List of shipwrecks: 10 February 1887
Ship	State	Description
A. C. Monroe	United States	The schooner was sunk in a collision off White Point in Pensacola Bay, Florida, with the tug Echo (United States).
Emerald, and German Empire	United Kingdom	The steamships collided at Havre de Grâce, Seine-Inférieure and were both severely damaged. Both vessels put in to Havre de Grâce.
Mendota	United States	The barque was abandoned in the Atlantic Ocean. Her crew were rescued by the steamship Hawarden (United Kingdom). Mendota was on a voyage from Bilbao, Spain to New York.
Meta	Germany	The ship departed from Philadelphia, Pennsylvania, United States for Liverpool, Lancashire, United Kingdom. No further trace, reported missing.
Wells City	United Kingdom	The steamship was driven by ice into another steamship and sank in the Hudson River at New York, United States. Her crew survive.

== 11 February ==
List of shipwrecks: 11 February 1887
Ship	State	Description
Coumoundouros	United Kingdom	The steamship was driven ashore and wrecked at L'Escala, Spain. Her crew were rescued. She was on a voyage from Genoa, Italy to Cartagena, Spain.
Joseph and Margaret	United Kingdom	The ship sank off Sark, Channel Islands. Her crew were rescued.
Margaret	United Kingdom	The ship departed from Figueira da Foz, Portugal for Saint John's, Newfoundland Colony. No further trace, reported missing.
Sulina	United States	The brig was driven ashore at Hilo, Kingdom of Hawaii. She subsequently became a wreck.
Thetis	United Kingdom	The ship was driven against the quayside at Fortune's Well, Portland, Dorset and developed a severe leak.

== 14 February ==
List of shipwrecks: 14 February 1887
Ship	State	Description
Austin Friars	United Kingdom	The steamship ran aground on the Melian Patch, in the Clyde. She was refloated and beached near Greenock, Renfrewshire.
Corisande	United Kingdom	The steamship was driven ashore near Penmarc'h, Finistère, France. She was on a voyage from Bilbao, Spain to Middlesbrough, Yorkshire.

== 16 February ==
List of shipwrecks: 16 February 1887
Ship	State	Description
African	United Kingdom	The steamship was wrecked on the Abu Mi Difi Reef, in the Red Sea off the coast of the Hejaz Vilayet 40 nautical miles (74 km) from Jeddah. Her crew abandoned the ship on 26 February; they were rescued by HMS Starling (Royal Navy) just before African broke in two and sank.
Bedlormie, Cambria, and Vane Tempest	United Kingdom	The steamships Cambria and Vane Tempest collided in the River Thames at Deptford, Kent and were both beached at Millwall, Essex. Bedlormie collided with both vessels and was damaged. Cambria was on a voyage from Leith, Lothian to London. The other two vessels were outward bound from London.
Earl of Powis	United Kingdom	The tug collided with the ferry Claughton and sank in the River Mersey at Birkenhead, Cheshire. Her crew were rescued by Claughton.
G. F. Williams	United Kingdom	The schooner was driven ashore 1 nautical mile (1.9 km) south of Irvine, Ayrshire. She was on a voyage from Larne, County Ayrshire to Irvine.

== 19 February ==
List of shipwrecks: 19 February 1887
Ship	State	Description
Abeille No.5	France	The tug collided with the steamship British Queen (United Kingdom) and sank at Havre de Grâce, Seine-Inférieure.

== 20 February ==
List of shipwrecks: 20 February 1887
Ship	State	Description
Annie Sophie	United Kingdom	The coal hulk was driven ashore at Stornoway, Isle of Lewis, Outer Hebrides.
Argentino	United Kingdom	The steamship collided with the steamship Gracie (United Kingdom) in the River Thames and was beached at North Woolwich, Middlesex. Argentino was on a voyage from Sebastopol, Russia to Millwall, Essex.

== 21 February ==
List of shipwrecks: 21 February 1887
Ship	State	Description
Hatfield	United Kingdom	The steamship ran aground at Greenock, Renfrewshire.

== 23 February ==
List of shipwrecks: 23 February 1887
Ship	State	Description
Antelope	United Kingdom	The fishing smack was run into by the fishing smack Britannia and sank in the North Sea 20 nautical miles (37 km) north of the Terschelling Lightship (Netherlands).
Cambria	United Kingdom	The barque ran aground in the River Thames downstream of Tilbury, Essex. She was on a voyage from Seaham, County Durham to London.
Celerity	United Kingdom	The ship was driven ashore in the River Thames at Tilbury. She was on a voyage from London to South Shields, County Durham.
Jane and Annie	United Kingdom	The schooner was driven ashore at Cliffe, Kent.
Grampus	United Kingdom	The barge was run into by the steamship Taurus (United Kingdom) in the River Thames at the entrance to the Grand Surrey Canal. She was beached and sank at Wapping, Middlesex.
River Lagan	United Kingdom	The steamship was driven ashore at the Coalhouse Fort, Essex. She was on a voyage from Terneuzen, Zeeland, Netherlands to London. She was refloated and resumed her voyage.
Vallejo, and Weatherall	United Kingdom	The steamship Weatherall collided with the barque Vallejo and sank in the English Channel off Folkestone, Kent with the loss of one of her thirteen crew. Survivors reached Dover, Kent in a boat. Weatherall was on a voyage from Sunderland, County Durham to Trouville-sur-Mer, Calvados, France. Vallejo was on a voyage from Portland, Oregon, United States to Hull, Yorkshire. She put in to Dover waterlogged at the bow

== 25 February ==
List of shipwrecks: 25 February 1887
Ship	State	Description
Albatros	Germany	The steamship ran aground in the River Thames at Woolwich, Kent, United Kingdom.
Phil Sheridan	United States	The schooner was wrecked at sea by capsizing. She righted in a water-logged condition after five minutes. Her crew were rescued on 27 February by an unknown vessel.

== 26 February ==
List of shipwrecks: 26 February 1887
Ship	State	Description
Loanda	Canada	The ship ran aground on Shell Wharf. She was on a voyage from San Francisco, California, United States to Fleetwood, Lancashire, United Kingdom. She was refloated and taken in to Fleetwood in a leaky condition.
Saltwick	United Kingdom	The barque struck the pier and sank at Dunkirk, Nord, France.
Sindbad	United Kingdom	The steamship put in to Milford Haven, Pembrokeshire on fire. She was on a voyage from Calais, France to Garston Docks, Lancashire.

== 27 February ==
List of shipwrecks: 27 February 1887
Ship	State	Description
Bertha	United Kingdom	The fishing smack was run down by the steamship Hansa (Germany) and sank in the North Sea 75 nautical miles (139 km) south by east of Spurn Point, Yorkshire.
Locksley Hall	United Kingdom	The full-rigged ship collided with the steamship Regulus and then with Brenda (both United Kingdom) and sank in the River Mersey. Locksley Hall was on a voyage from San Francisco, California, United States to Liverpool, Lancashire. She was refloated on 13 June and taken in to Tranmere, Cheshire.

== 28 February ==
List of shipwrecks: 28 February 1887
Ship	State	Description
Valparaiso	United Kingdom	The steamship was wrecked near Vigo, Spain. All on board were rescued by HMS Minotaur (Royal Navy). Valparaiso was on a voyage from Liverpool, Lancashire to a port on the west coast of the United States.

== Unknown date ==
List of shipwrecks: Unknown date in February 1887
Ship	State	Description
Advance	United Kingdom	The schooner was driven ashore on Anholt, Denmark. She was on a voyage from Malmö, Sweden to Hull, Yorkshire. She was refloated and taken in to Helsingør, Denmark.
Agate	United Kingdom	The steamship was driven ashore in the Carlingford Lough. She was on a voyage from Irvine, Ayrshire to Newry, County Antrim.
Agnes Otto	United Kingdom	The steamship ran aground at "Zindjir Bozan", Ottoman Empire. She was on a voyage from Odesa, Russia to Malta.
Augusta	United Kingdom	The steamship ran aground at the mouth of the River Tyne.
Beatrice	United Kingdom	The ship collided with a tug and was driven ashore in the River Avon. She was refloated on 25 February but sank. She was refloated the next day.
Calabria, and Rosario	United Kingdom; Italy	The barque Rosario collided with the steamship Calabria and sank. Rosairo was on a voyage from Genoa to the Cape Verde Islands. Calabria was severely damaged. She was on a voyage from Newport, Monmouthshire to Naples. She put in to Cartagena, Spain.
Constance	United Kingdom	The schooner ran aground at the Nakkehoved Lighthouse, Denmark. She was on a voyage from Portmadoc, Caernarfonshire to Copenhagen, Denmark. She was refloated and completed her voyage, arriving on 2 February.
Dona Zemlya	Sweden	The schooner was wrecked at Anegada, Bahamas. Her crew were rescued.
Energia	United Kingdom	The steamship was driven ashore at Suez, Egypt. She was on a voyage from London to Bombay, India.
Euphrates	United Kingdom	The ship was driven ashore at Port Darwin, South Australia. She was on a voyage from the Clyde to Port Darwin. She was refloated and taken in to Port Darwin.
Harold	United Kingdom	The steamship was driven ashore at Vlissingen, Zeeland, Netherlands. She was refloated and taken in to Vlissingen.
Helgesen	United Kingdom	The barque was driven ashore on Læsø.
John C. Noyes	United States	The brig ran aground at Cárdenas, Cuba. She was on a voyage from Cárdenas to New York. She was refloated and completed her voyage in a leaky condition.
Kennebec	United States	The ship was driven ashore and wrecked at San Pedro, California. Also reported to have sunk at Deadman Island. She was refloated in April.
Kincardineshire	United Kingdom	The barque ran aground on the Ridge Shoal, in the Bassein River.
Marie	United Kingdom	The ship arrived at New York, United States on fire and was beached. She was on a voyage from London to New York.
Mary Bradford	United States	The ship was wrecked on a reef off Bermuda. She was on a voyage from New York to Saint Thomas, Virgin Islands.
Nautu	Italy	The barque foundered in the Atlantic Ocean. Her crew were rescued. She was on a voyage from Montevideo, Uruguay to Falmouth, Cornwall, United Kingdom.
Nelusko	Flag unknown	The ship was lost. Her crew were rescued.
Nentwater	United Kingdom	The steamship ran aground at Les Sables-d'Olonne, Vendée, France and was damaged. She was reflaoted.
Norman MacLeod	United Kingdom	The ship collided with the quayside at Timaru, New Zealand and was damaged.
Palmira C.	Italy	The barque was driven ashore on Martinique. She was refloated and taken in to Fort-de-France in a severely leaky condition.
Paquebot No. 3	France	The schooner was run down and sunk in the Gironde by the steamship Trelleborg (Sweden).
Petrus	Germany	The barque was driven ashore. She was refloated and taken in to Tromsø, Norway, where she arrived on 19 February.
Rambler	United Kingdom	The steamship was driven ashore at "Stuben". She was on a voyage from Riga, Russia to Campbeltown, Argyllshire.
R. M. J. Charnley	United Kingdom	The ship ran aground on the Goodwin Sands, Kent. She was refloated and towed in to Ramsgae, Kent by a tug and a lifeboat.
Royal Alice	United Kingdom	The barque was driven ashore at Panaroekan, Netherlands East Indies.
Scottish Prince	United Kingdom	The barque was driven ashore at Brisbane, Queensland.
Sei Fratelli	Italy	The barque ran aground in Vuelta Antonio. She was on a voyage from Cardiff, Glamorgan, United Kingdom to Campana, Argentina.
S. H. Love	Denmark	The barque foundered in the Baltic Sea. Her crew were rescued by the schooner Julio (Spain). S. H. Love was on a voyage from Cagliari, Sardinia, Italy to Stockholm, Sweden.
Struan	United Kingdom	The ship ran aground. She was on a voyage from New Orleans, Louisiana, United States to Havre de Grâce, Seine-Inférieure, France. She was refloated on 23 February and resumed her voyage.
Wilhelm	Flag icon	The ship was wrecked near Bergen, Norway. She was on a voyage from the River Tyne to Santos, Brazil.
Unnamed	China	The junk was wrecked on the coast of Siam with the loss of about 600 lives. There were six survivors. She was on a voyage from Hainan to Siam.
Three unnamed vessels	Netherlands East Indies	The lighters were driven ashore at Panaroekan.
