= Helsinge (disambiguation) =

Helsinge is a town in Denmark.

Helsinge may also refer to:

- Helsinge (municipality), a former municipality of Frederiksborg County, Denmark
- the Swedish name for the Finnish city of Vantaa until 1972
  - the Swedish name for Helsingin pitäjän kirkonkylä, a district of Vantaa
