= Græsted-Gilleleje =

Former municipality in Denmark

Coordinates: 56°07′22″N 12°18′35″E

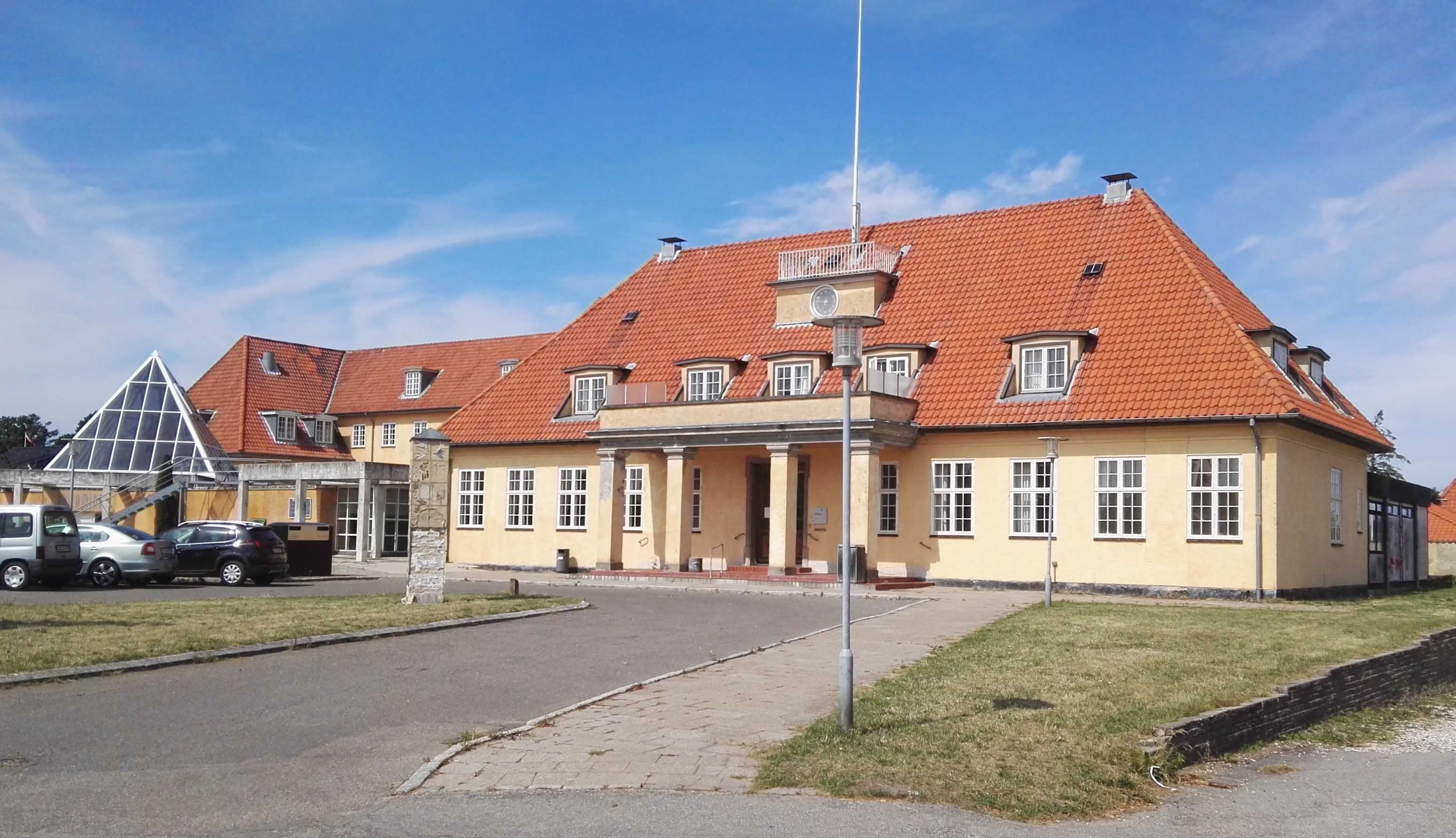
Gilleleje Municipality Town Hall at Vesterbrogade 50 in Gilleleje

Until 1 January 2007 Græsted-Gilleleje was a municipality (Danish, kommune) in Frederiksborg County on the north coast of the island of Zealand (Sjælland) in eastern Denmark. The municipality covered an area of 134 km^{2}, and had a total population of 20,936 (2005). Its last mayor was Jannich Petersen, a member of the Venstre (Liberal Party) political party. The main town and the site of its municipal council was the town of Gilleleje.

Græsted-Gilleleje municipality ceased to exist due to Kommunalreformen ("The Municipality Reform" of 2007). It was combined with Helsinge municipality to form the new Gribskov municipality. This created a municipality with an area of 278 km^{2} and a total population of 40,409 (2005). The new municipality belongs to Region Hovedstaden ("Capital Region").

== See also ==
- Holbo Herred
