= Vejby Treasure =

Danish archaeological find

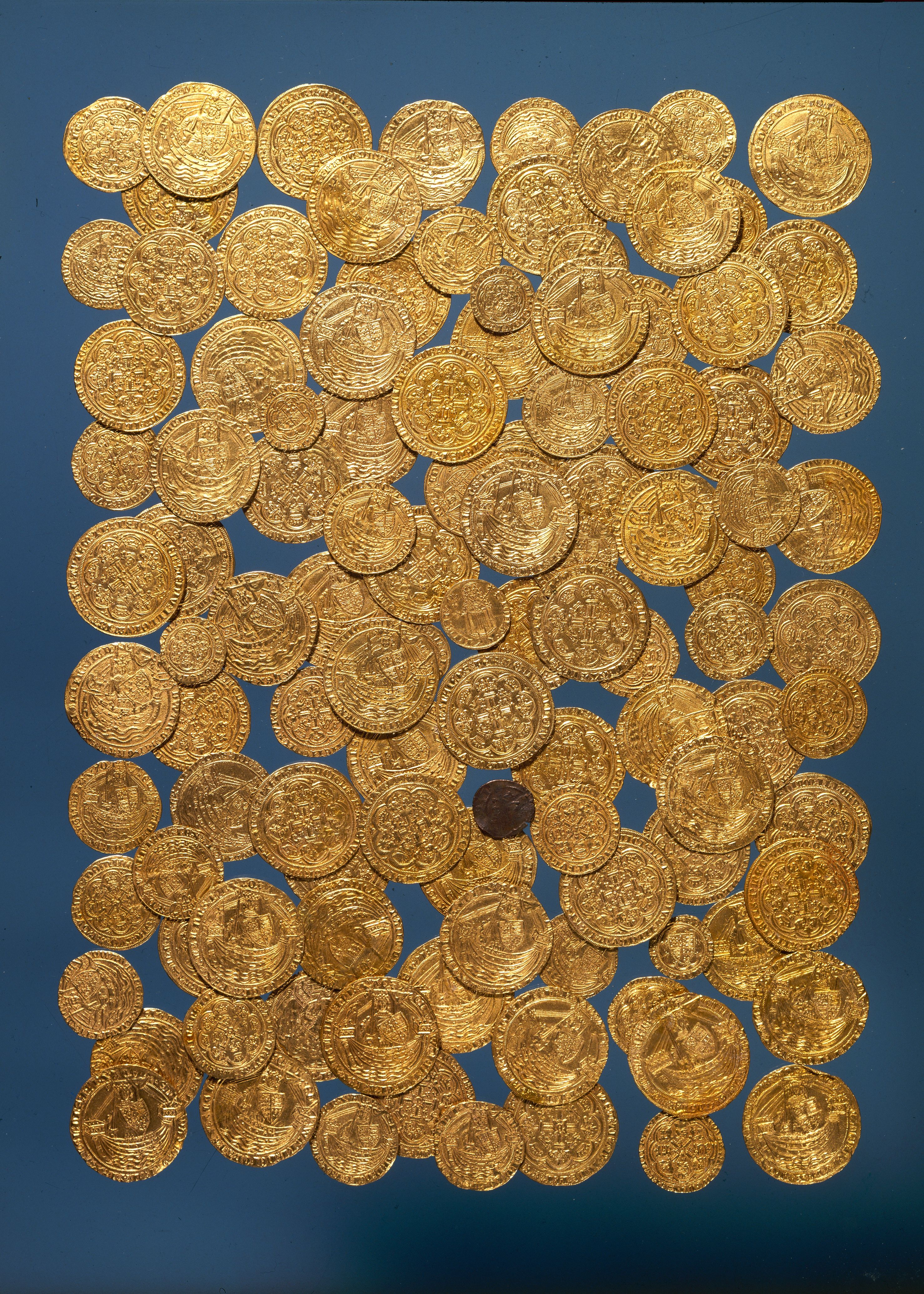
The Vejby Treasure.

The Vejby Treasure (Danish: Vejbyskatten), also known as the Vejby Beach Treasure (Danish: Vejby Strand Skatten), is a treasure trove discovered in 1976 on shallow water off the north coast of Zealand at Vejby Beach, Gribskov Municipality, some 60 km north of Copenhagen, Denmark. It consists of 110 gold coins and a single copper coin. 109 of the gold coins are English nobles and one is a Lübeck guilder. It comes from a cog which wrecked at the site some time between 1377 and 1380 on its way to the Baltic Sea or the Skåne Markets for trade. It is now on display in the National Museum of Denmark.

== Discovery ==
The wrecked cog was one of two wrecks in the area examined by a diver in the 1920s. The wreck seemed only to contain ballast stones and did therefore not catch his attention. The other wreck contained rusted-together rifles, which were lifted with an explosive charge, so that he could see if more precious metals were hidden underneath them. He did not find anything and therefore lost interest in the site.

The 16-year-old archeologically interested schoolboy Jesper Egesø spotted a tin plate sticking out of the sand when he was diving at the site during the summer of 1975. He reported his find to the National Museum of Denmark's Department of Medieval History, whose experts were not able to date it, but they passed the information on to the museum's Ship-Historic Laboratory. They arranged an inspection with the finder in early summer 1976, but due to bad weather it had to be postponed. Egesø promised to keep the wreck under observation and not to tell anyone about it. Shortly thereafter, as he went diving there again, he discovered 94 gold coins. A team of experts were immediately sent to the site by the Ship-Historic Laboratory. They spent the next ten days surveying it. This led to the discovery of another 16 gold coins, one copper coin, fragments of pots and jugs made of bronze and tin, textile fragments and a range of other objects. Egesø received a Danefæ compensation of DKK 15,000. The wreck of the cog was six weeks later lifted and transported to Copenhagen for conservation.

== Description ==
The 111 coins have a total weight of 694 grams (1.530 lb). 109 of the 110 gold coins are English nobles struck during the reign of Edward III between 1351 and 1377. 74 of them were one-nobles, 30 were half-nobles and five quarter-nobles. The last gold coin was a Lübeck guilder. The last of the 111 coins was a Flemish nite made of almost pure copper.

== Interpretation ==
It is assumed that the cog wrecked some time between 1377 and 1380. The skipper must have been killed since the gold coins were not recovered after the incident. The ballast stones are from a rock formation that stretches from western Norway in the north through Scotland, Ireland, Cornwall and Bretagne to Spain in the south. It is therefore assumed that the ship wrecked en route to the Baltic Sea or possibly the Skåne Market for trade.
