= Listed buildings in Gribskov Municipality =

This is a list of listed buildings in Gribskov Municipality, Denmark.

== List ==
=== 3120 Dronningmølle ===
Listing name	Image	Location	Coordinates	Description
Munkeruphus		Munkerup Strandvej 78, 3120 Dronningmølle	56°6′34.21″N 12°21′55.75″E	Country house from 1916 by Therkel H. Hjejle og Niels Rosenkjær
Munkeruphus		Munkerup Strandvej 78, 3120 Dronningmølle	56°6′34.21″N 12°21′55.75″E	Outbuilding from 1917
Rudolph Tegner Museum		Museumsvej 19, 3120 Dronningmølle	56°5′11.15″N 12°24′2.06″E	Museum building from 1938 by Rudolph Tegner and Ernst Ishøy in association with Mogens Lassen

=== 3200 Helsinge ===
Listing name	Image	Location	Coordinates	Description
Kongensgave		Østergade 55, 3200 Helsinge	56°1′27.48″N 12°12′26.88″E	
Pibe Windmill		Høbjergvej 34, 3200 Helsinge	56°7′9.02″N 12°13′23.17″E	Stub mill from 1789

=== 3210 Vejby ===
Listing name	Image	Location	Coordinates	Description
Rågegården		Rågeleje Strandvej 1A, 3210 Vejby	56°6′21.91″N 12°10′42.64″E	House from 1915 by Povl Baumann
Rågegården		Rågeleje Strandvej 1A, 3210 Vejby	56°6′21.91″N 12°10′42.64″E	Stables from 1915 by Povl Baumann

=== 3220 Tisvildeleje ===
Listing name	Image	Location	Coordinates	Description
Rigmor Stampes Vej 15		Rigmor Stampes Vej 15, 3220 Tisvildeleje	56°2′53.3″N 12°5′50.18″E	Guesthouse at Niels Bohr's holiday home from 1957 by Vilhelm Wohlert
Sandflugtsmonumentet		Alleen 0, 3220 Tisvildeleje	56°3′9.41″N 12°5′57.85″E	Monument from 1738 by Elias David Häusser and Didrick Gercken
Silkebjerg 3		Silkebjerg 3, 3220 Tisvildeleje	56°2′5.11″N 12°5′55.66″E	Thatched, wooden leisure home in Tibirke Bakker from 1932 and the studio wing from 1937
Strandvejen 20		Strandvejen 20, 3220 Tisvildeleje	56°3′51.22″N 12°4′52.38″E	Holiday home from 1956 by Arne Jakobsen
Villa Vendle		Ved Gærdet 1, 3220 Tisvildeleje	1953	Country House from 1912 by 1912 af Bent Helweg-Møller
Villa Vendle		Ved Gærdet 1, 3220 Tisvildeleje	1953	Country House from 1912 by 1912 af Bent Helweg-Møller

=== 3230 Græsted ===
Listing name	Image	Location	Coordinates	Description
Esrum Abbey		Klostergade 11A, 3230 Græsted	56°2′50.8″N 12°22′38.4″E	
Esrum Watermill		Klostergade 12A, 3230 Græsted	56°2′46.67″N 12°22′37.12″E	Main building from c. 1880
Esrum Watermill		Klostergade 12A, 3230 Græsted	56°2′46.67″N 12°22′37.12″E	Northern stables wing
Esrum Watermill		Klostergade 12B, 3230 Græsted	56°2′45.57″N 12°22′36.71″E	Residential extension to the watermill building
Esrum Watermill		Klostergade 12C, 3230 Græsted	56°2′46.94″N 12°22′38.14″E	Watermill and ålekiste
Esrum Watermill		Klostergade 12D, 3230 Græsted	56°2′46.15″N 12°22′37.67″E	Southern stables wing

=== 3250 Gilleleje ===
Listing name	Image	Location	Coordinates	Description
Fiskerhuset		Østergade 10, 3250 Gilleleje	56°7′25.36″N 12°18′35.36″E	Fisherman's House from the late 18th century which was adapted in 1868
Fiskerhuset		Østergade 10, 3250 Gilleleje	56°7′25.36″N 12°18′35.36″E	Outwing
Nakkehoved Eastern Lighthouse		Fyrvejen 27, 3250 Gilleleje	56°7′8.75″N 12°20′58.63″E	Lighthouse from 1772 by G. D. Anthon with later alterations
Nakkehoved Eastern Lighthouse		Fyrvejen 29A, 3250 Gilleleje	56°7′8.45″N 12°20′57.11″E	Attached residence from 1772 by G. D. Anthon with later alterations
Nakkehoved Western Lighthouse		Fyrvejen 25A, 3250 Gilleleje	56°7′9.02″N 12°20′34.88″E	Lighthouse from 1772 by Georg David Anthon which was altered and heightened in 1898
Nakkehoved Western Lighthouse		Fyrvejen 25A, 3250 Gilleleje	56°7′9.02″N 12°20′34.88″E	Attached residence from 1772 by Georg David Anthon with later alterations

== See also ==
- List of churches in Gribskov Municipality
