= Smidstrup =

- Village
- Location within Denmark Location within Capital Region
- Coordinates: 56°06′55″N 12°14′22″E
- Country: Denmark
- Region: Capital (Hovedstaden)
- Municipality: Gribskov

Area
  - Urban: 2.7 km^{2} (1.0 sq mi)

Population (2026)
  - Urban: 1,153
  - Urban density: 430/km^{2} (1,100/sq mi)

Smidstrup is a town in the Gribskov Municipality in North Zealand, Denmark. It is a coastal town and is located next to the Kattegat, four kilometers west of Gilleleje, three kilometers east of Vejby Strand and 12 kilometers north of Helsinge. As of 2026, it has a population of 1,153.
