= Helsinge (municipality) =

Former municipality in Frederiksborg, Denmark

Coordinates: 56°01′21″N 12°11′52″E

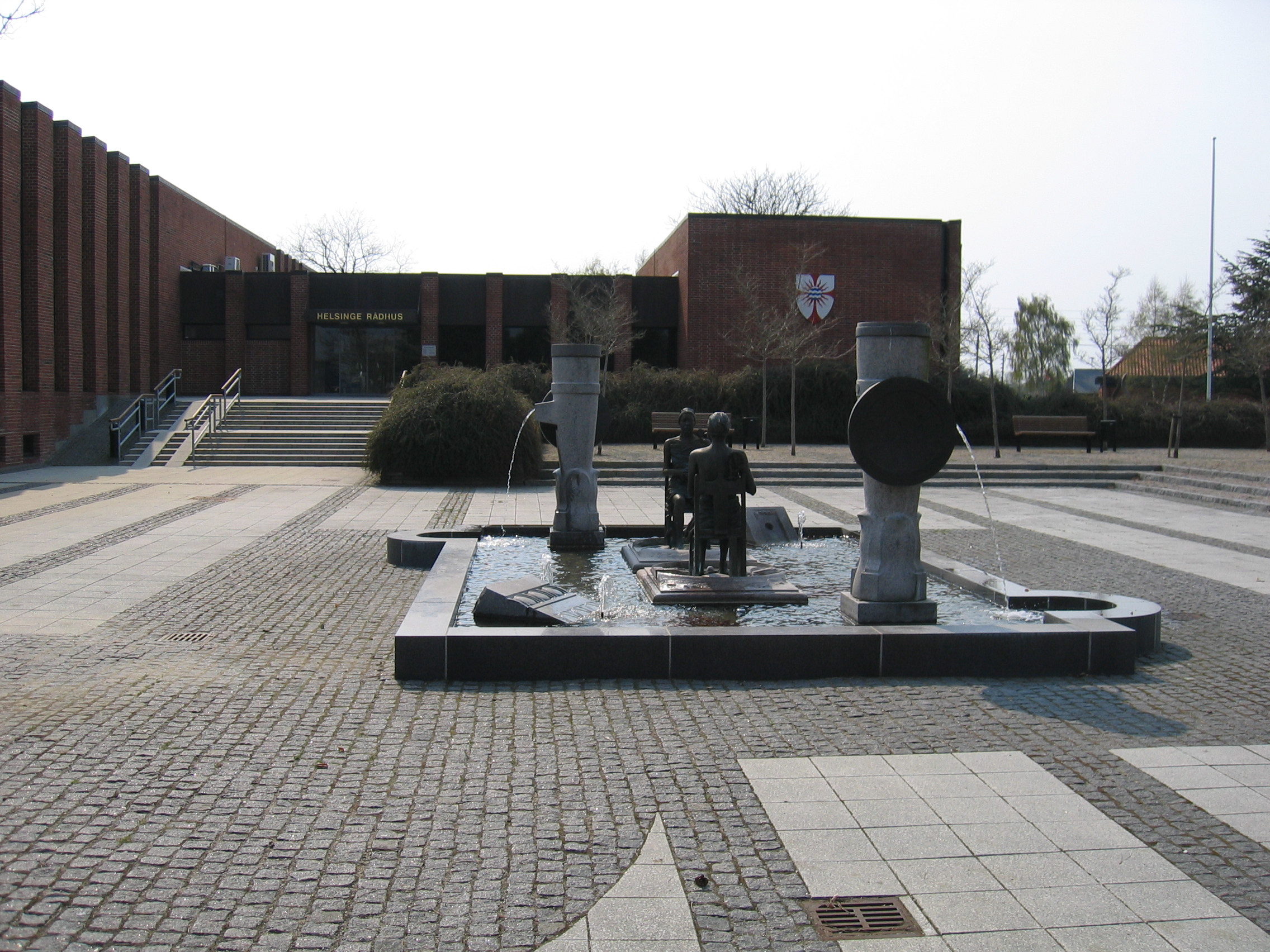
Helsinge town hall

Until 1 January 2007, Helsinge was a municipality (Danish, kommune) in Frederiksborg County on the north coast of the island of Zealand (Sjælland) in eastern Denmark. It had a total population of 19,473 (2005), but in the summer months the population grew to over 36,000 people. Its last mayor was Claus Lange, a member of the Venstre (Liberal Party) political party. The main town and the site of its municipal council was the town of Helsinge.

The municipality was created in 1970 due to a kommunalreform ("Municipality Reform") that combined the former municipalities Helsinge/Valby/Mårum, Vejby/Tibirke, Ramløse/Annisse.

Helsinge municipality ceased to exist as a result of Kommunalreformen ("The Municipality Reform" of 2007). It was combined with Græsted-Gilleleje municipality to form the new Gribskov municipality. This created a municipality with an area of 278 km^{2} and a total population of 40,409 (2005). The new municipality belongs to Region Hovedstaden ("Capital Region").

== See also ==
- Helsinge, Denmark
- Helsinge railway station
- Holbo Herred
