= Nakkehoved Lighthouse =

Lighthouse in Denmark

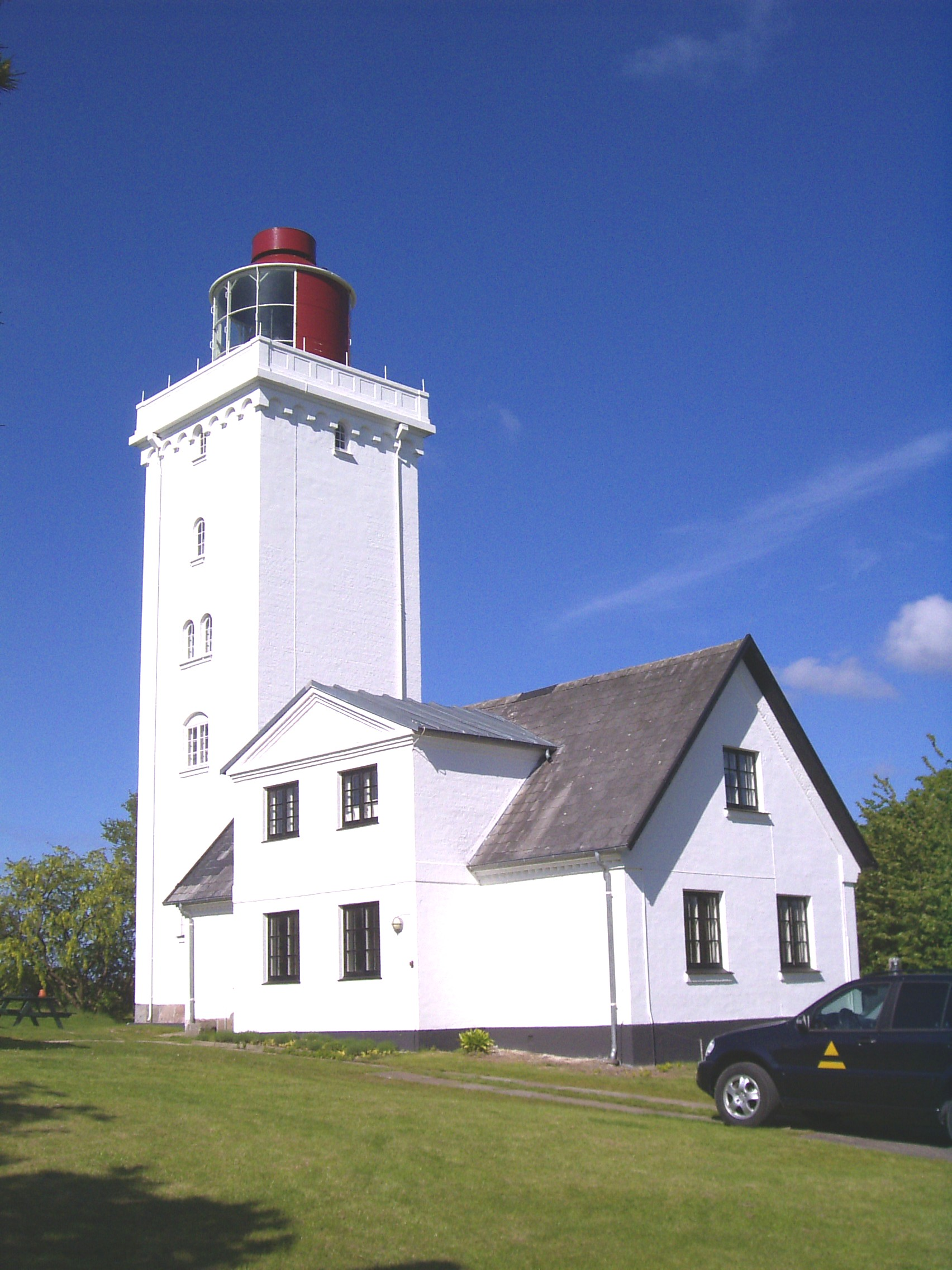
- Nakkehoved Lighthouse (western tower)
- Location: Nakkehoved, Gribskov Municipality, Denmark
- Coordinates: 56°06′N 12°18′E

Tower
- Constructed: 1772
- Construction: brick
- Automated: 2003
- Height: 21 m (69 ft)
- Shape: rectangular
- Operator: Museum Nordsjælland
- Heritage: monument on Kulturstyrelsen register

Light
- First lit: 1800
- Focal height: 54 m (177 ft)
- Lens: first order Fresnel lens
- Light source: incandescent bulb
- Intensity: 229,358 candela
- Range: 20 nmi (37 km; 23 mi)
- Characteristic: Fl(3) W 30s

Nakkehoved Lighthouse (Danish: Nakkehoved Fyr) was originally the name for two individual lighthouses above the namesake Nakkehoved cliffs, between Gilleleje and Hornbæk, approximately 40 km north of Copenhagen, Denmark. Since the eastern lighthouse was decommissioned in 1898, the name Nakkehoved Lighthouse has come to refer to only the western tower, which is still operational. The eastern lighthouse was listed on the Danish registry of protected buildings and places in 1976. The western lighthouse was also listed on the registry in 2002.

The lighthouse marks the entrance to the Kattegat sea, and it parallels the Kullen Lighthouse in Sweden on the other side of the Øresund strait. The tower is 21 meters tall and emits 3 blinks of 0.3-second duration every 20 seconds. The light has a brightness of 229,358 cd and can be seen from 25 nautical miles (ca. 46 km) away in clear weather.

On the site there is also an automated weather station, restaurant, and, since May 15, 2005, a Museum of International Lighthouse History.

== History ==
Until the end of the 18th century, only three lighthouses in Skagen, Anholt, and Kullen guided the shipping route through the Kattegat. Two towers were proposed instead of one so that sailors could differentiate them from the lighthouse in Kullen, and a royal resolution on December 10, 1770, ordered their construction on the Nakkehoved cliffs. Both were designed by the architect G.D. Anthon and built at the king's expense. By 1772, both of the towers were completed. They were originally 9 and 7.5 meters tall and lit by coal fires in iron baskets at the top of each tower.

The original lighthouses were located roughly 2 kilometers west of the town of Gilleleje at the coordinates:

- 56°07′09.38″N 12°20′34.97″E (West tower) and
- 56°07′08.7″N 12°20′58.5″E (East tower).

The two towers were initially only operational from April 1 to August 31, 1772, and were shut down due to tax disputes. The towers were not relit until 1800, when maritime pilot Poul de Løvenørn began to use the towers to experiment with lighthouse technique. The coal fires were converted into closed lanterns to accommodate his research. In 1833 both towers were rebuilt to run on oil and mirror apparatuses were installed. The western tower was fitted with 18 mirrors and lamps, while the eastern tower had 8.

The eastern tower was decommissioned in 1898 and later refurbished to its state in 1800. It is now one of the few preserved coal-burning lighthouses in the world.

Following the eastern tower's decommission, the western tower was raised to its current height of 21 m and refitted with a rotary lens and 6-wall burner. In 1906, it was converted to an incandescent burner, and the fuel was switched from oil to petroleum. In 1955, the tower was again converted to an electrical supply with a lightbulb as the light source. The lighthouse was staffed until 2003, when the last lighthouse keeper, who had lived on the grounds, retired.

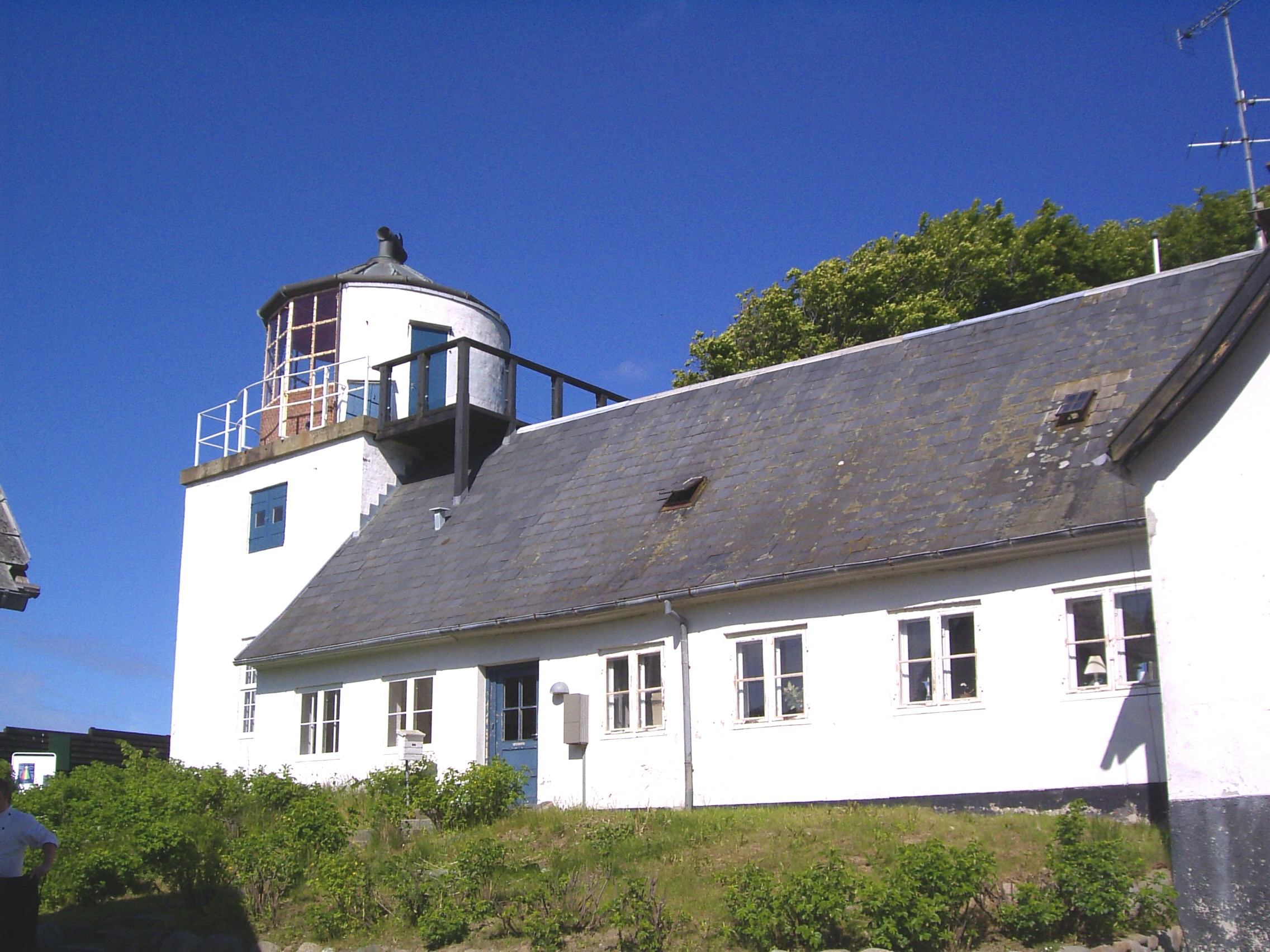
Nakkehoved Lighthouse (eastern tower)

On April 12, 1987, the body of 35-year-old Lene Kehner was found buried near the lighthouse. No one has ever been convicted of the murder.

== Optical telegraph ==
In March 1801 an optical telegraph was constructed on the site called Nakkehoved Station. Shortly thereafter, on March 26, 1801, a vital message was sent, which read:

En engelsk flåde ligger en halv mil i nordøst til øst fra Nakkehoved, i alt 52 skibe

An English fleet is located a half a mile northeast to east of Nakkehoved, 52 ships in all

The message was sent via Kronborg to Copenhagen, and alerted the capital of the impending attack by admiral Nelson's fleet. The attack became known as the Battle of Copenhagen, and preceded Denmark's involvement in the Napoleonic Wars. The telegraph station was closed in 1814 following the end of the war, along with nearly all of the other optical telegraph stations in Denmark.

== Ornithological observation ==
The two towers stand on top of the Fyrbakkerne, which rise 33 m above the water. Because the cliffs provide habitat for many birds, and 135 bird species have been observed, the area is considered an ornithological observation place and is protected as an EU habitat area.
