= Vejby, Gribskov Municipality =

Vejby
- Town
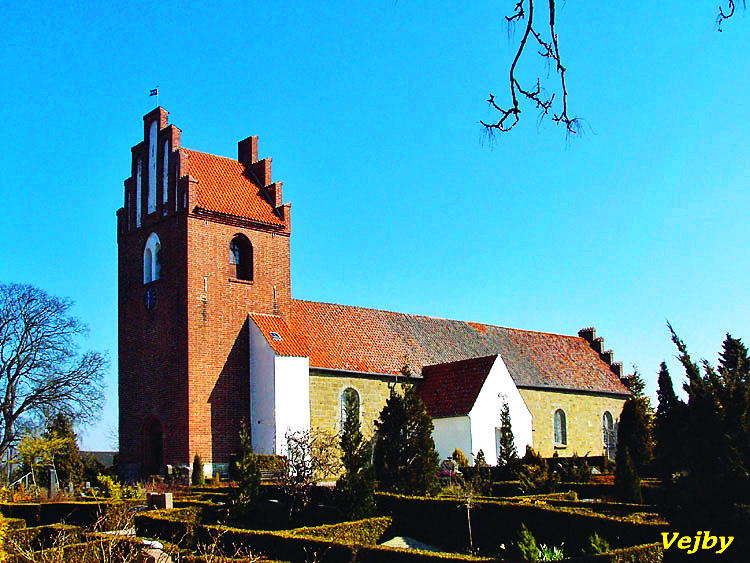
- Vejby Church

- Location in Denmark Vejby (Capital Region)
- Coordinates: 56°4′N 12°8′E
- Country: Denmark
- Region: Capital Region
- Municipality: Gribskov Municipality

Area
  - Urban: 0.74 km^{2} (0.29 sq mi)

Population (2026)
  - Urban: 1,073
  - Urban density: 1,400/km^{2} (3,800/sq mi)
- Time zone: UTC+1 (CET)
  - Summer (DST): UTC+2 (CEST)
- Postal code: 3210 Vejby

Vejby is a parish and small town in Gribskov Municipality, near Zealand's Kattegat coast, some 50 km north of Copenhagen, Denmark. The town of Vejby is located three kilometres east of Tisvilde and three kilometres south of Rågeleje, both popular coastal resorts, and seven kilometres north of Helsinge. Vejby railway station is located on the Tisvilde branch of the Gribskov Railway and is served by Lokaltog. The town's most notable landmark is its 12th-century church. Vejby Strand (Vejby Beach) is a summer house area.

== History ==
=== Middle Ages ===
Vejby is first mentioned in King Valdemar's Census Book from the beginning of the 13th century. The name means "town by a road". Most of the parish, which had some of the best soil in North Zealand, belonged to Esrum Abbey, although Æbelholt Abbey owned some property in the village of Ørby. The village was one of the most prosperous in Holbro Herred as witnessed by tax lists from the 16th century. The prosperity of the village in early times is also indicated by the large size of its church which is second only to Søborg Church in size among the area's churches, although donations from pilgrims visiting St Helen's spring and grace at Tsivilde have also contributed to this.

=== 18th and 19th centuries ===
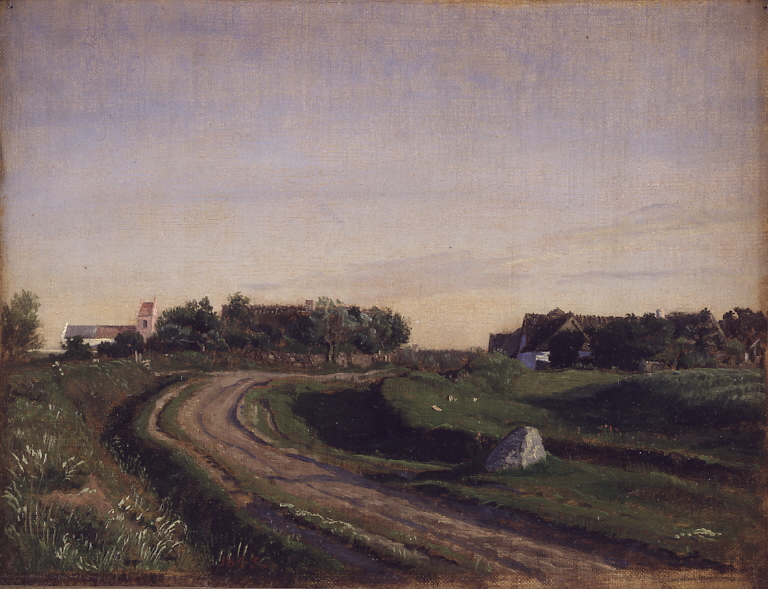
Vejby in 1843 painted by P. C. Skovgaard

In the 17th century, Vejby, like many other localities along the coast, was hit hard by drifting sands and was compensated with freedom from taxes. Vejby was passed by both Helsinge and Græsted in the 19th century. Agriculture remained its most important source of income. Windmills were located in both Ørby, Holløse and Unnerup. Ørby cooperative dairy opened in 1888. The first school in Vejby was a rytterskole.

=== 20th century ===
The rytterskole was replaced by a new public school in 1912. The Gribskov Railway opened in 1924. The senior citizens home, Trongården, opened in 1967, the same year the Ørby Dairy ceased operations.

== Description ==
Vejby Church dates from the first half of the 12th century and is built in sandstone blocks from the Helsingborg area. The current church tower is younger. The interior features murals that are different from other murals in the area but similar to decorations in Scania.

Rising to 49 metres, the coastal cliffs at Vejby Strand are the highest on North Zealand's Kattegat coast.

== Transport ==
Vejby is served by Vejby railway station which is located on the Tisvildeleje branch of the Gribskov Railway and is served by Lokaltog.

== Notable people ==
- P.C. Skovgaard (1817–1875) a Danish national romantic landscape painter, associated with the Golden Age of Danish Painting; he grew up in Vejby and returned to paint, spending several summers there, sometimes accompanied by his friend and colleague Johan Thomas Lundbye
- Annika Wedderkopp (born 2004), singer and actress

== Gallery ==
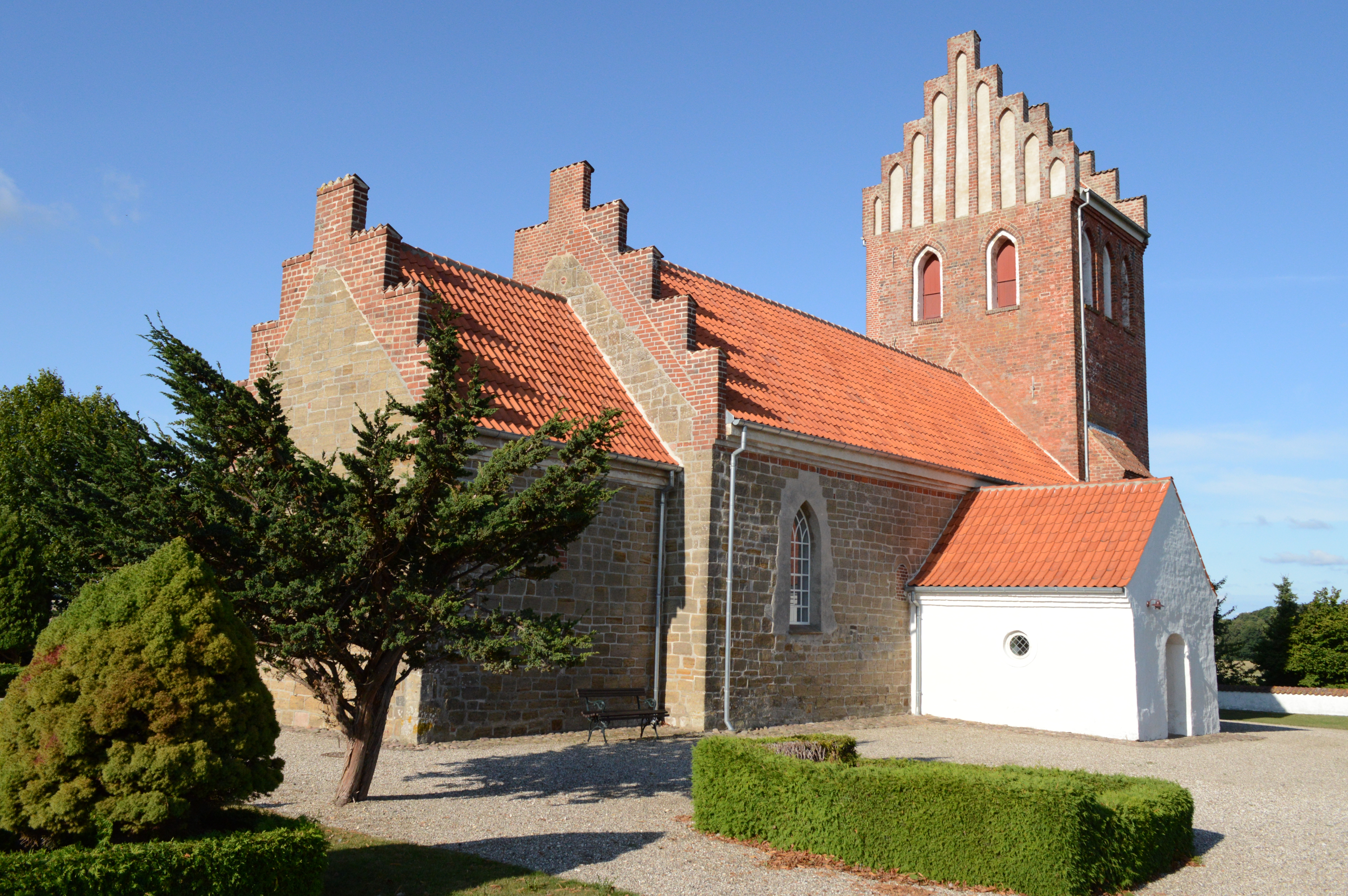
Vejby church, 2018

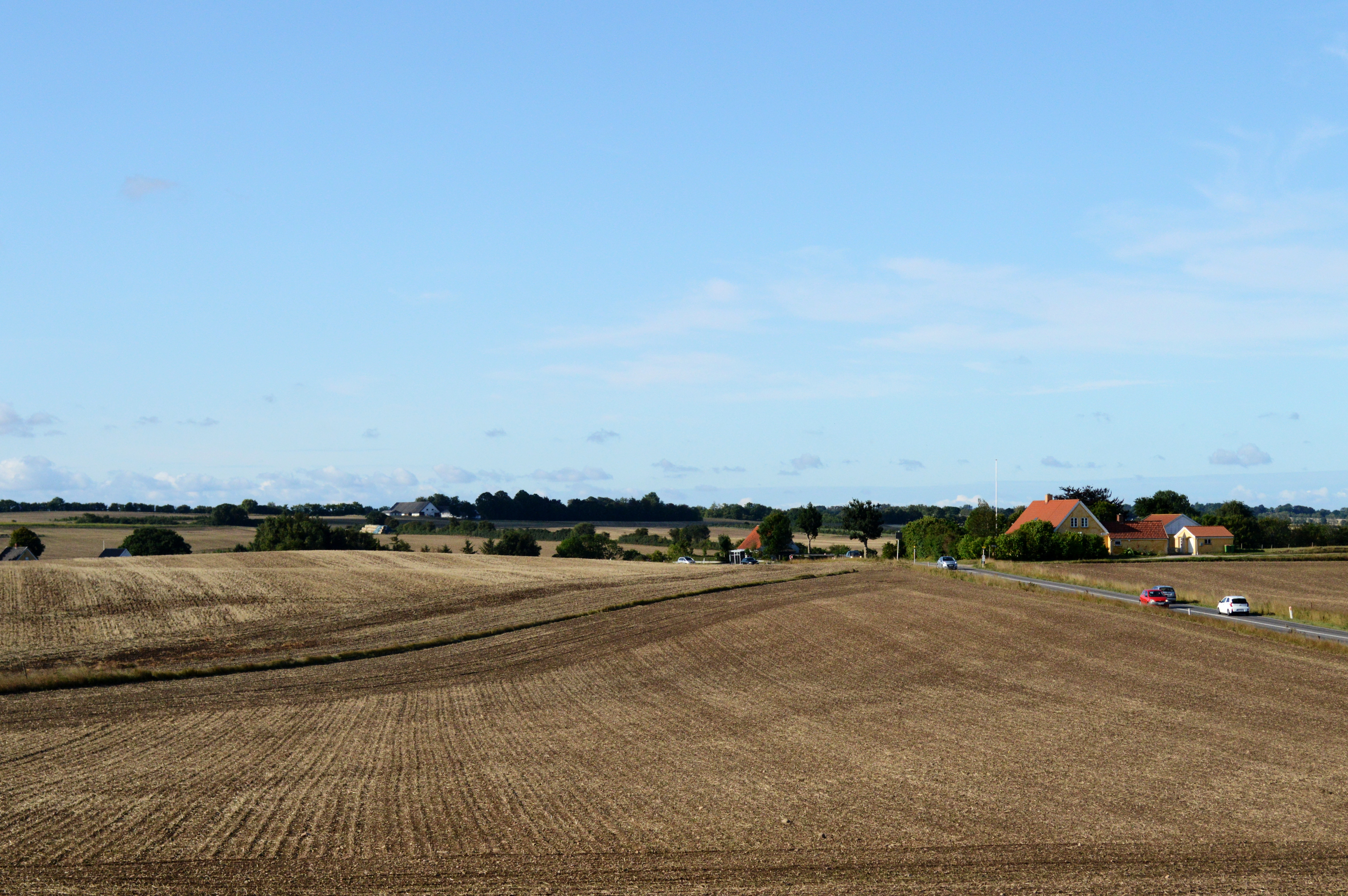
Croplands near Vejby church, 2018

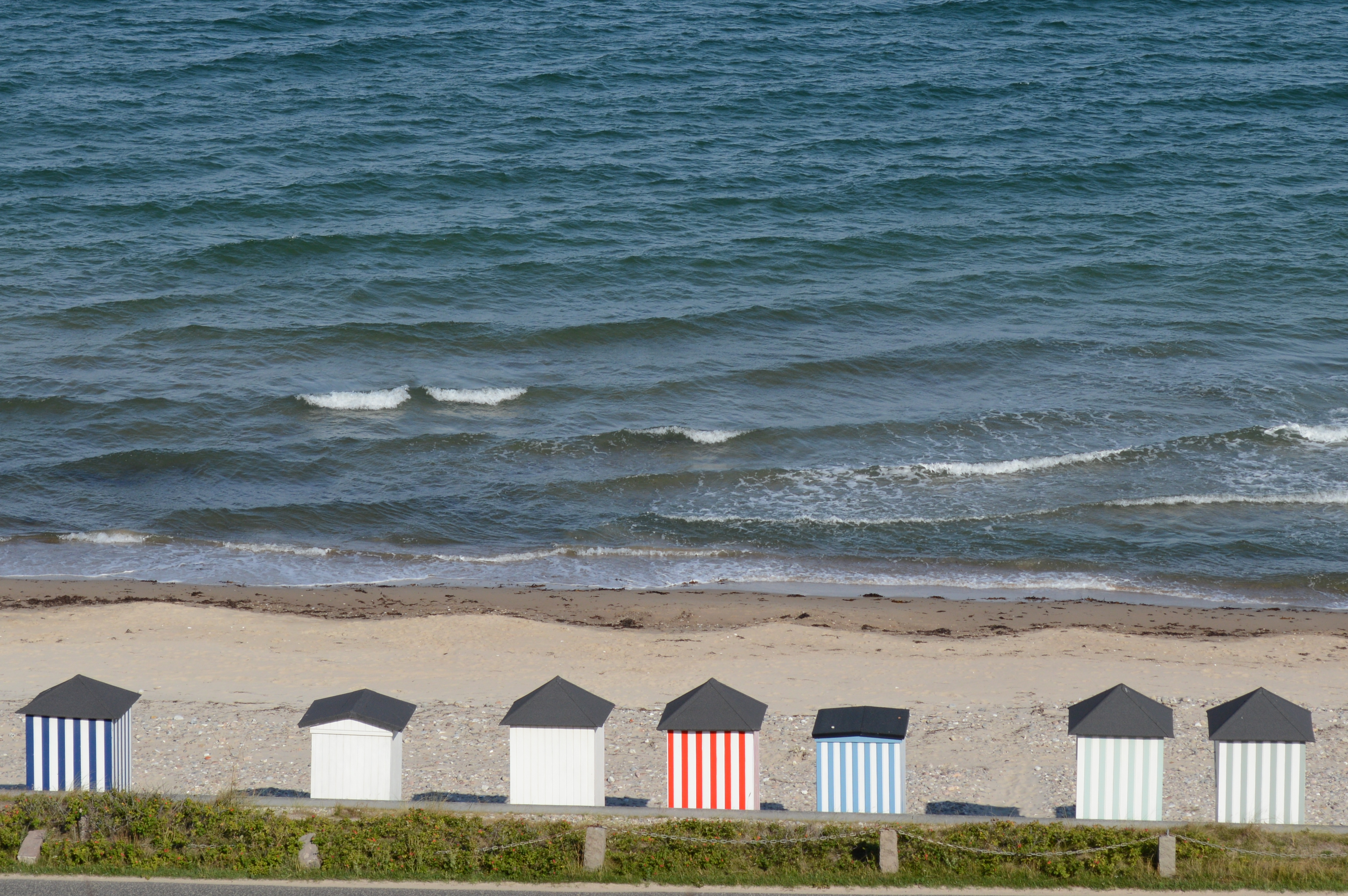
Beach changing room in Vejby, 2018

== See also ==
- Vejby Treasure
