= Søborg, Gribskov Municipality =

Søborg
- Town
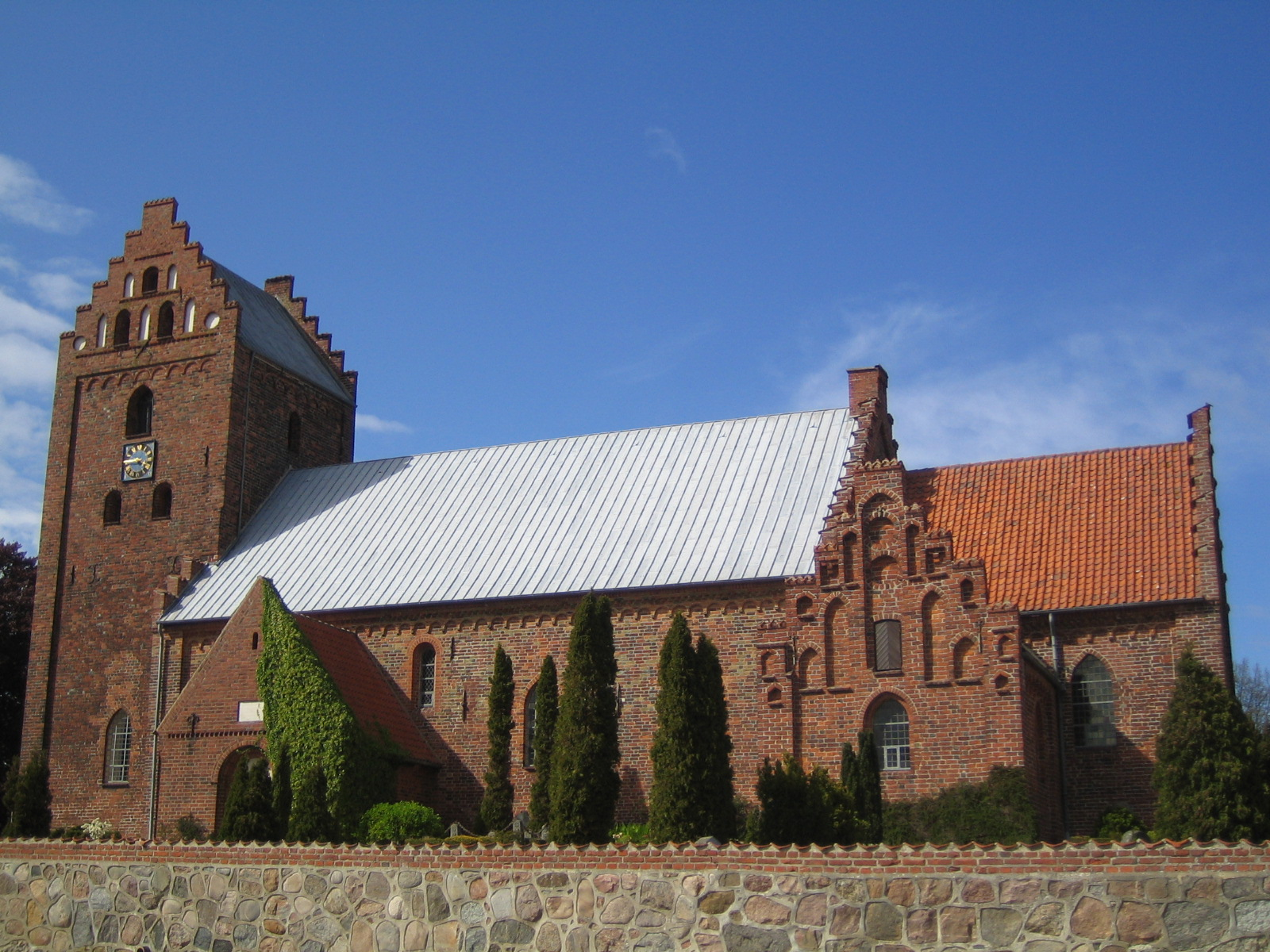

- Coat of arms

- Location in Denmark
- Coordinates: 56°5′N 12°19′E
- Country: Denmark
- Region: Capital Region
- Municipality: Gribskov

Population (2026)
  - Total: 238
- Time zone: UTC+1 (CET)
  - Summer (DST): UTC+2 (CEST)

Søborg is a parish and small community situated a few kilometers south of Gilleleje in Gribskov Municipality, North Zealand, Denmark, some 40 km north of Copenhagen. It takes its name after Søborg Castle, which was destroyed during the Count's Feud and is now left as a ruin. The town was a market town in the Middle Ages and remained the main town of Holbo Herred until the beginning of the 19th century. Today it only has a population of 238 (1 January 2026). Søborg Church dates from the 12th century. Søborg Lake to the north of the town was drained in the 19th century.

== History ==
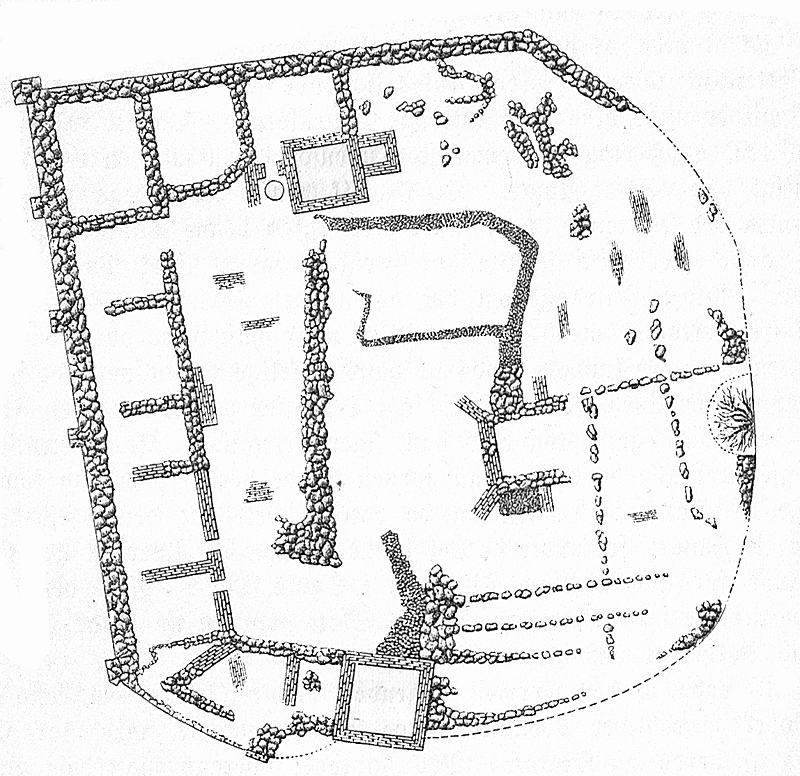
Floor plan

Little is known about the early history of Søborg Castle. It stood on a small peninsula on the south side of Søborg Lake and may have been built by Eskil. It was later used as a state prison before it was destroyed during the Count's Feud. The town of Søborg (Seoburgh) is referred to as a market town in about 1270. From 1341, there is evidence of a St. Gertrud's Guild and a St Knud's Guild in the town. A town hall and thing is mentioned in 1405. In 1559, Søborg is still referred to as a market town. In 1577, the king's vassal at Keonborg was granted permission to use the ruins as a quarry. Several letters show that King Fredrick II visited the town in 1580. A witch burning took place in the town square in 1582. In 1950, Frederick VII participated in archeological excavations of Søborg Castle. They have been followed by other surveys and excavations, resulting in a number of finds.

Søborg remained the main town of Holbo Herred until the beginning of the 19th century. The first efforts to drain Søborg lake took place in the late 18th century when a canal was dug between the lake and the Kattegat at Gilleleje. The lake remained a marshy area for almost a hundred years. In 1872, Count C. E. Frijs purchased the area and commissioned the engineer Peter Feilberg to complete the project. Søborg Windmill was built in 1983 and decommissioned in 1918.

== Description ==
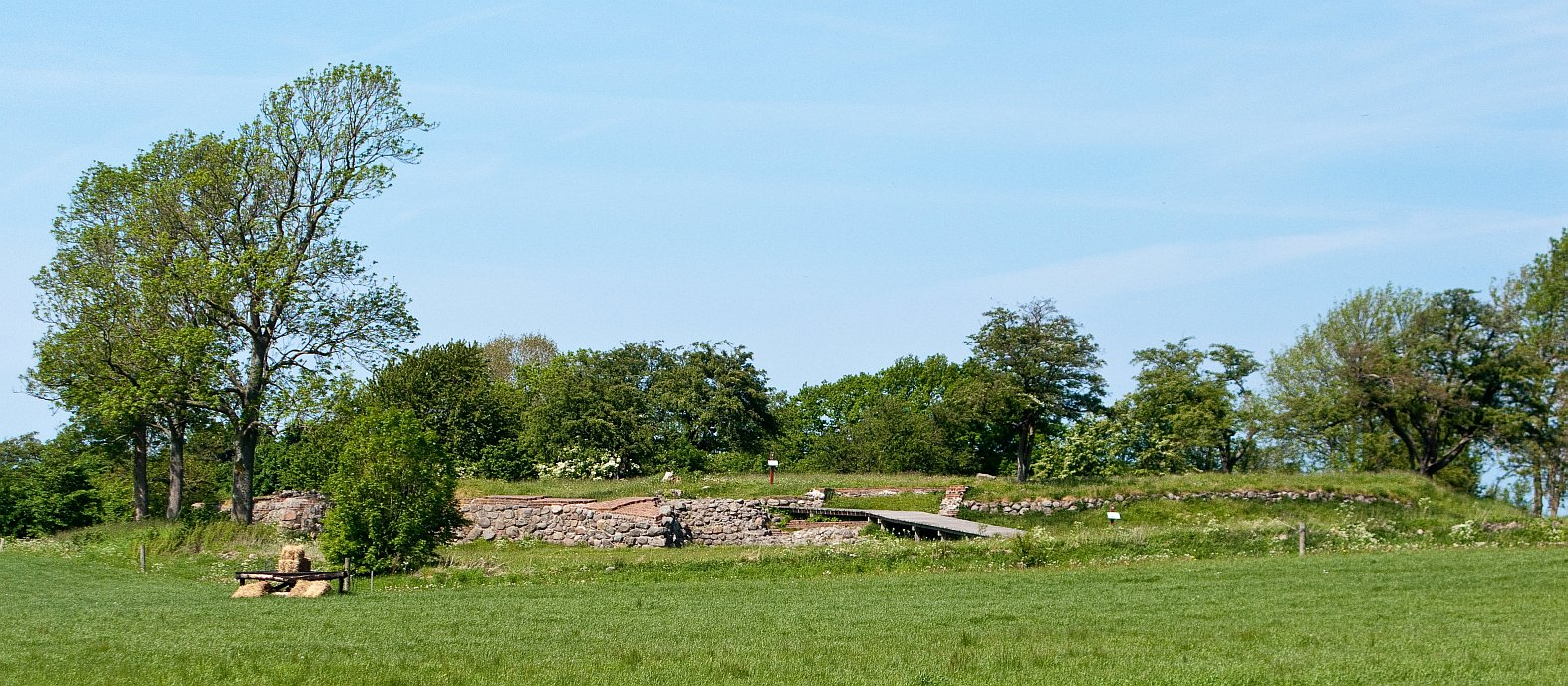
The castle ruin

Søborg Church is built in red brick and dates from about 1200. It was originally 30 metres long. The tower, sacristy and porch are later additions. In the south wall of the chancel is a tile stone with a Runic inscription inscribed before the stone was burned. It reads "The first" and was possibly the foundation stone.

A pumping station at Søborggaard currently drains Søborg Lake at a rate of 75,000 litres per day. It has been proposed to restore the lake.

Søborg railway halt is located about 2 km (1.2 mi) north east of the village of Søborg. It is located on the Hornbæk railway line from Helsingør to Gilleleje.

== Notable people ==
- Margaret I of Denmark (1353–1412) the Queen who founded the Kalmar Union was born in Søborg Castle
- Otto Christian Hammer (1822 in Hulerød, Søborg Sogn – 1892) a Danish naval officer who participated in the First Schleswig War and the Second Schleswig War

== See also ==
- Munkerup
