= Georg David Anthon =

Danish architect (1714–1781)

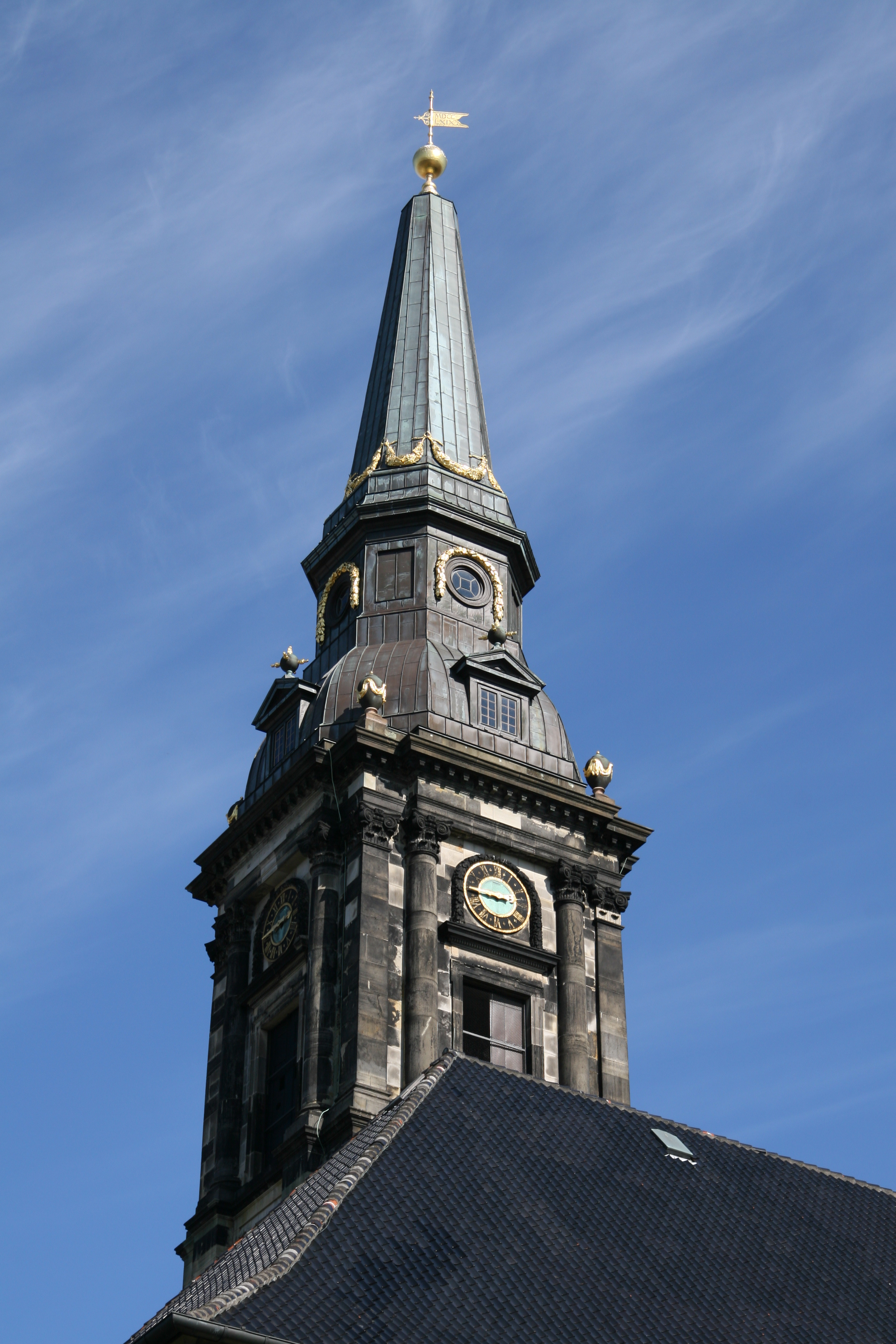
Tower of Christian's Church, Copenhagen

Georg "George" David Anthon (1 October 1714 – 30 August 1781) was a German-born Danish architect.

== Background ==
Anthon was born in Northern Germany. He was student of Danish architect Nicolai Eigtved (1701–1754) and graduated as a teacher of geometry and architecture from The Royal Danish Academy of Fine Arts in 1748. He continued as an instructor at the Academy until 1760.

== Career ==
In 1751, he became a royal building inspector (kongelig bygningsinspektør), For a short period after Nicolai Eigtved's death in 1754, Anthon led the account-taking work on Frederik's Church (Marmorkirken). In 1761 he was named Royal Master Builder with responsibility for all the royal castles and homes. He worked as a teacher at the Royal Danish Academy until 1760. He applied for membership of the Academy in 1759 but his application was denied. He never gained membership.

He was schooled in the Rococo style of architecture when Neoclassicism was regarded as the leading style. He was controversial and proposed tearing down the spires of both the Stock Exchange ([Børsen) which dated from 1640 and the Main Tower of Rosenborg Castle dating from 1624 and replacing them with dome structures. The architect Caspar Frederik Harsdorff (1735–1799), intervened and stopped the plan.

Anthon was entrusted with supervising the actual construction of Christian's Church, Copenhagen (Christians Kirke) which was designed by Nicolai Eigtved and completed in 1759. Anthon also designed the tower which is an addition from 1769. Anthon also built the stables at both Frederiksberg Palace and Nakkehoved Lighthouse and also redesigned Bregentved Estate. In 1759, he published Anvisning til den civile Bygningskunst - Instructions for Civilian Architecture in English, which was published in three editions.

== Personal life ==
On April 28, 1755, Anthon married Anne Margrethe, daughter of Nicolai Eigtved. Their his son Adam Gottlob Anthon was born in 1756. Anthon died on August 30, 1781 in Copenhagen.

== See also ==
- List of Danish architects
