= Vejby Church =

Coordinates: 56°3′51.4″N 12°8′27″E

- Vejby Kirke
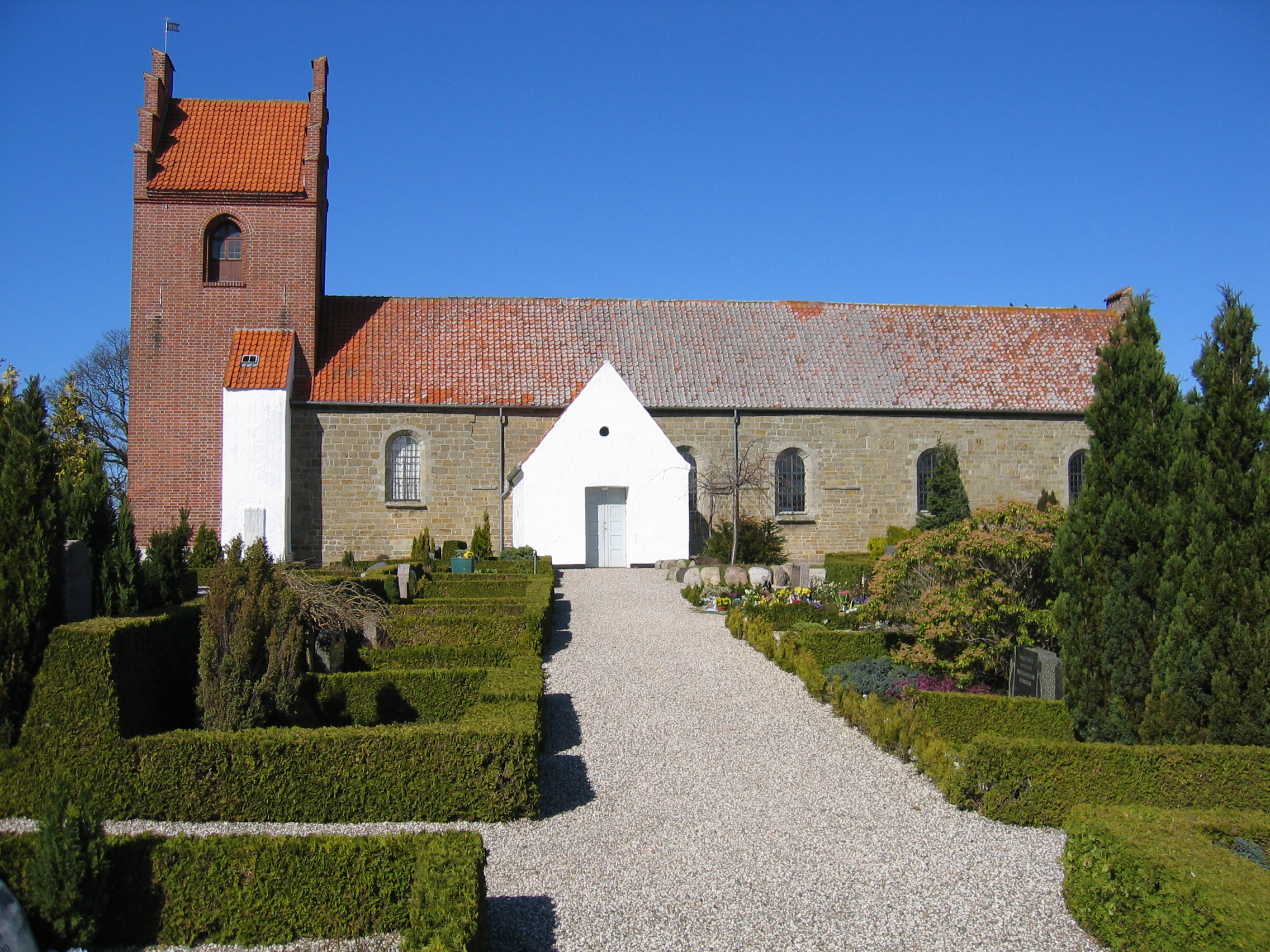
- Vejby Church
- Location: Vejby, Gribskov Municipality, Denmark
- Denomination: Church of Denmark

Architecture
- Architectural type: Romanesque style
- Years built: 12th century

Administration
- Diocese: Diocese of Helsingør
- Parish: Vejby Sogn

Vejby Church (Danish: Vejby Kirke) is a Church of Denmark parish church situated in the little village of Vejby, between Tisvilde and Helsinge, Gribskov Municipality, some 60 km northwest of Copenhagen, Denmark. It consists of a Romanesque nave from the first half of the 12th century, tower and chancel from around 1500 and two porches from the 19th century. It is notable for its late Gothic fresco paintings in the chancel arch from the 15th century. The painter Ejler Bille is buried in the associated graveyard.

== Interior ==
The interior is decorated with church frescos. Some of them were created by the Issefjord Workshop.

== Graveyard ==
The surrounding graveyard is surrounded by a white-plastered wall from around 1786. A modern extension from 1967 is connected to it via two narrow openings. Notable burials include:

- Ejler Bille (1910-2004), painter
- Arne Ingdam (1921-2002), sculptor
- Agnete Therkildsen (1900-1993), painter

== Gallery ==
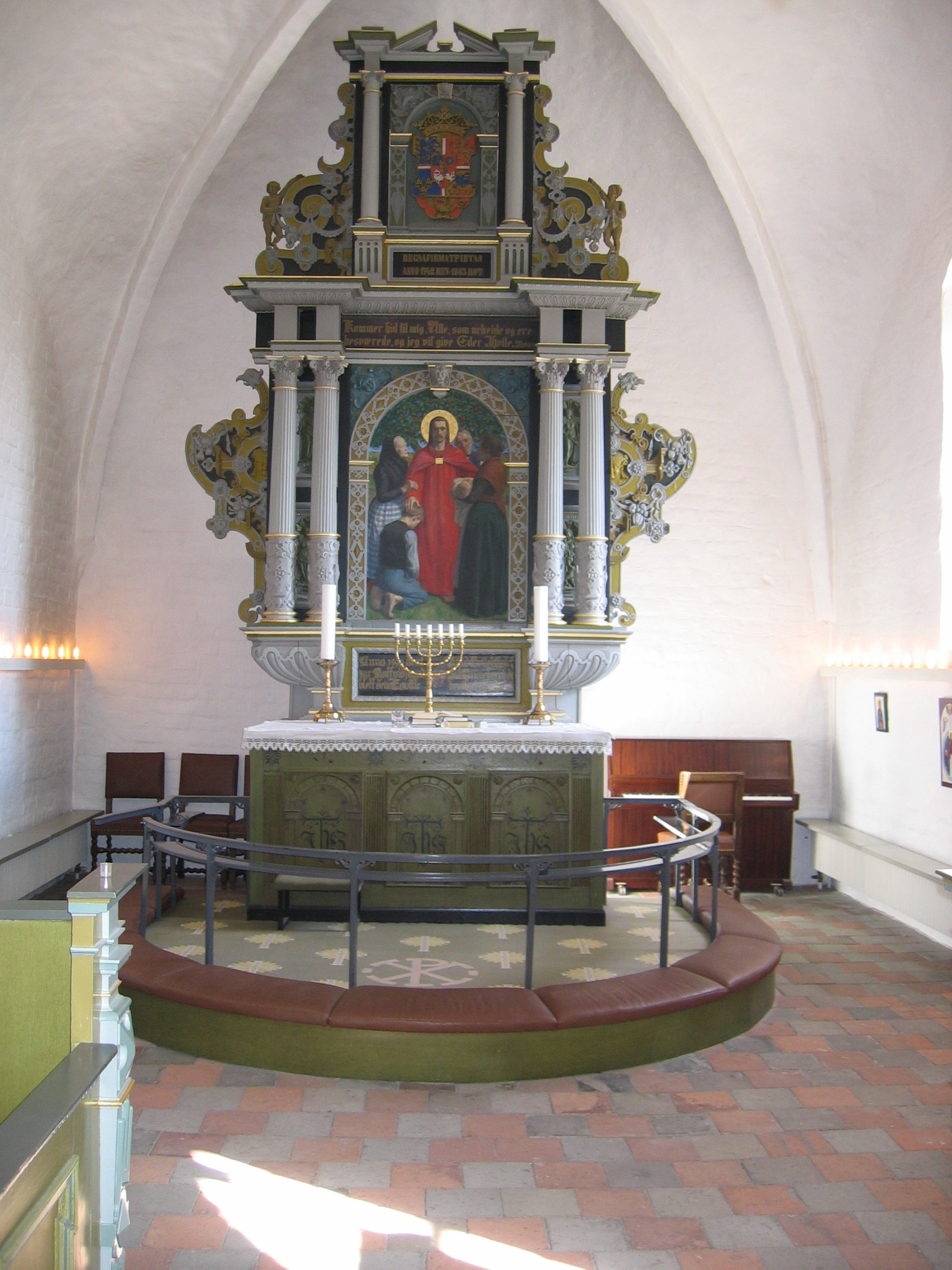
The altarpiece

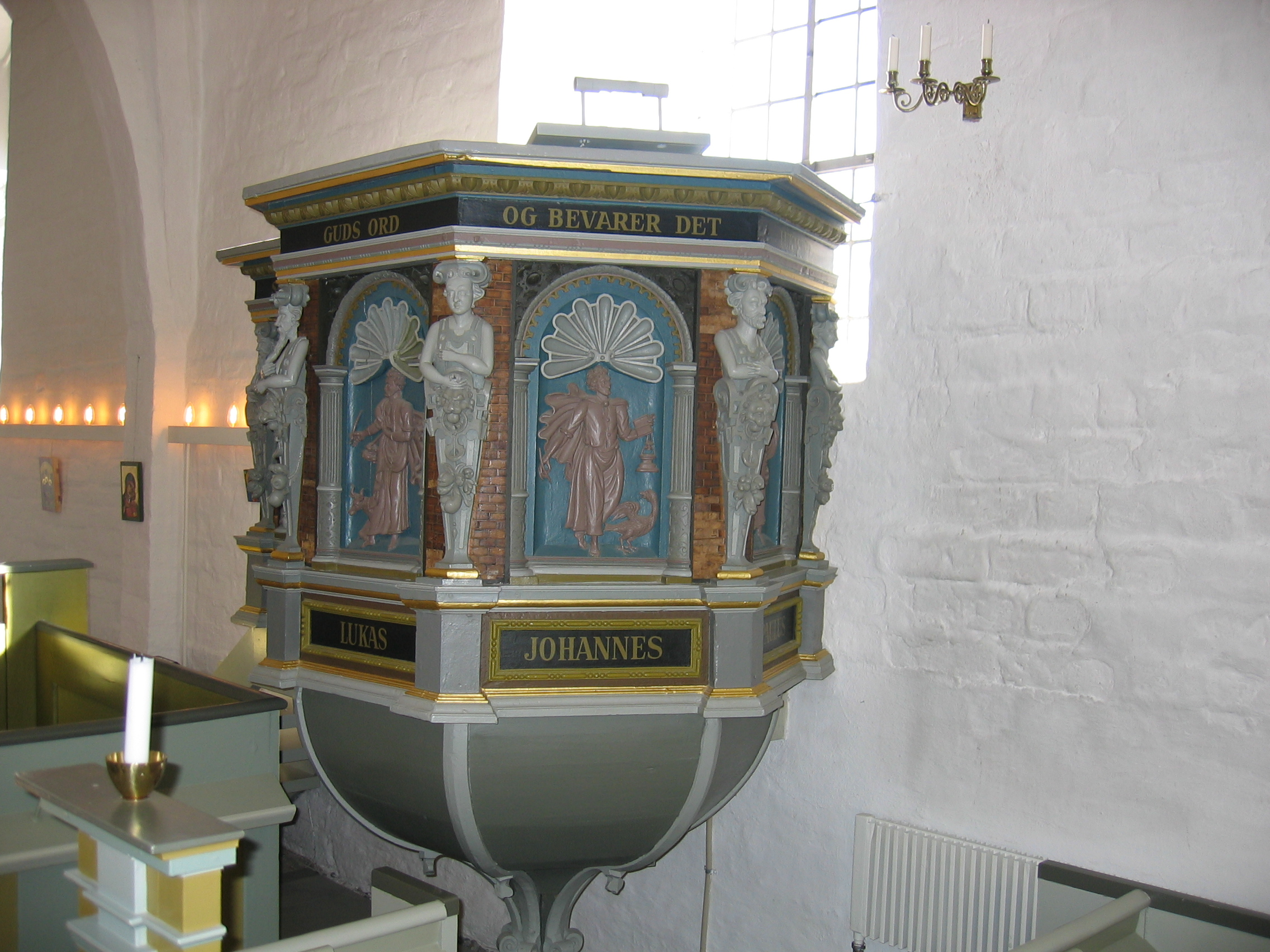
The pulpit

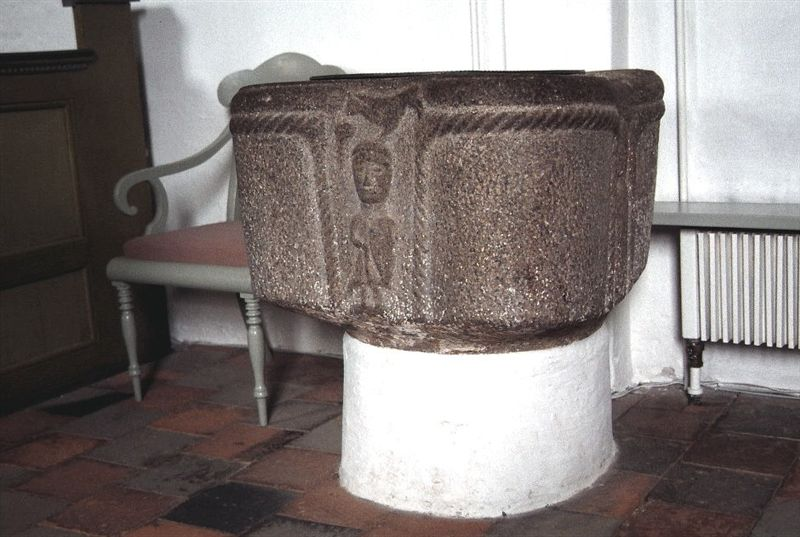
The baptismal font
