= Holbo Herred =

Coordinates: 56°02′N 12°16′E

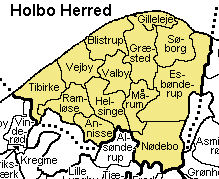
Holbo Herred

Holbo Herred (Holbo Hundred) was an administrative division in Frederiksborg County in the northern part of the island of Zealand, Denmark. It comprised the present-day Gribskov Municipality plus the parish of Nødebo (which today is in Hillerød Municipality). Previously, Holbo was under Strø Herred.

== Seal ==
Holbos seal from 1648 represents Søborg Castle.

== Parishes ==
The following parishes are located in the former hundred.

- Annisse Parish
- Blistrup Parish
- Esbønderup Parish
- Gilleleje Parish
- Græsted Parish
- Helsinge Parish
- Mårum Parish
- Nødebo Parish
- Ramløse Parish
- Søborg Parish
- Tibirke Parish
- Valby Parish
- Vejby Parish

== See also ==
- Hundreds of Denmark
