= Søborg Castle =

Castle ruins south of Gilleleje, Denmark

Coordinates: 56°05′26.38″N 12°18′33.36″E

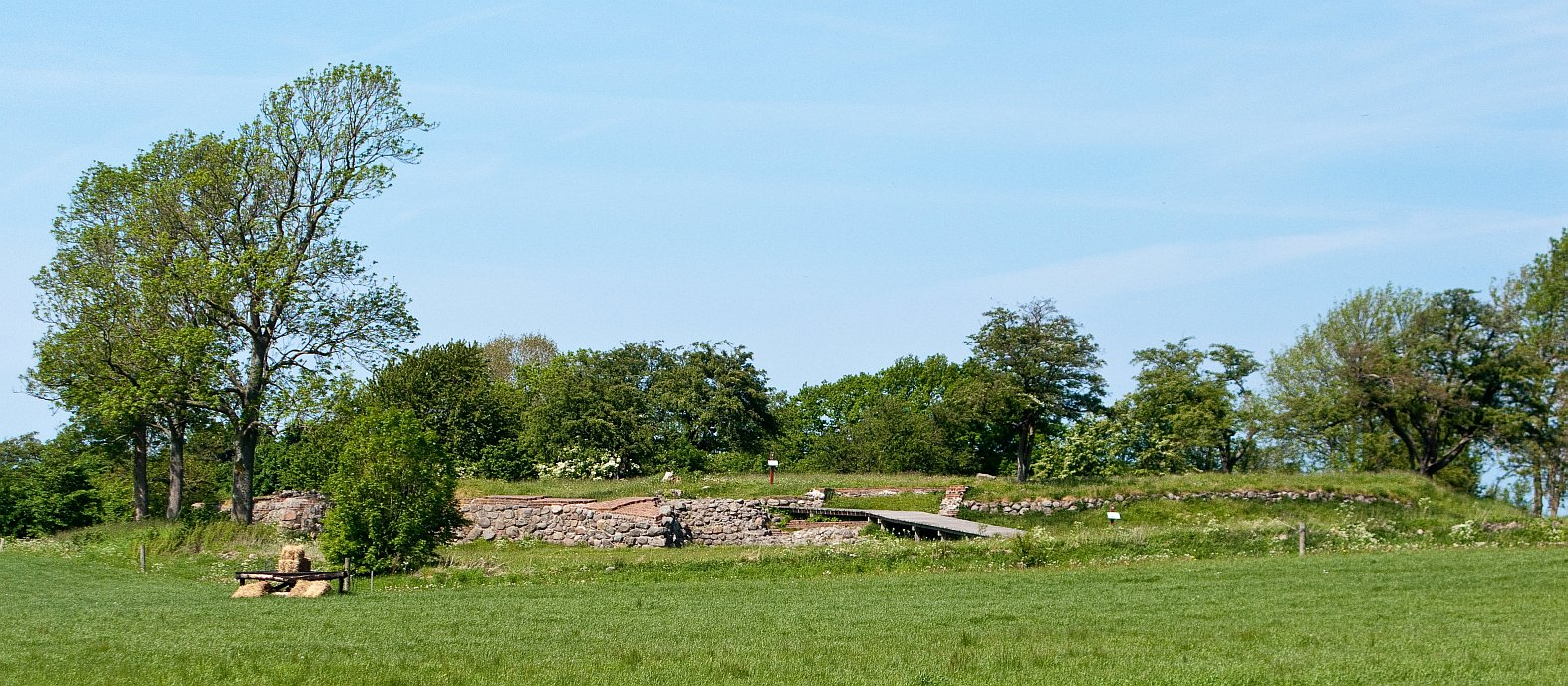
Ruins of Søborg Castle

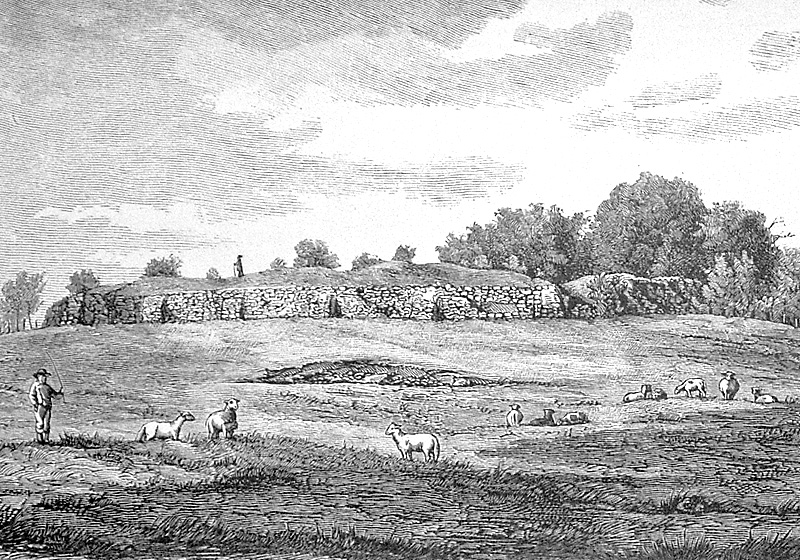
The ruins of Søborg Castle in the late 19th century

Søborg Castle (Danish: Søborg Slot, pronounced [ˈsøˌpɒˀ ˈslʌt]) is a ruined castle south of Gilleleje in North Zealand, Denmark. It was one of the strongest castles in Denmark and was also used as a prison. It was inhabited until the Count's Feud in 1535, when it is speculated that it was destroyed. In 1577, the feudal tenant was granted permission to use the ruins as a quarry.

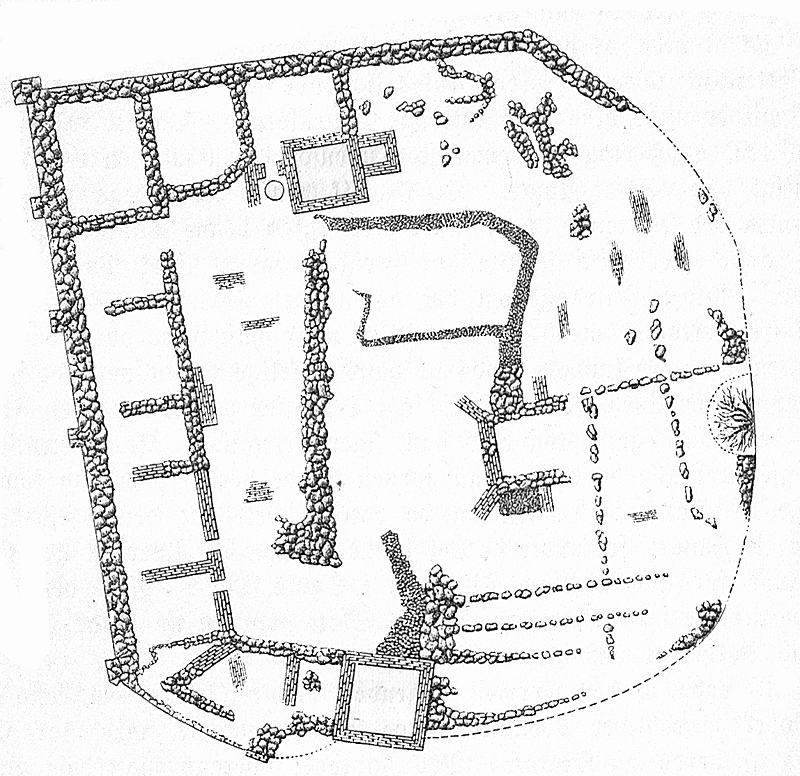
Floor plan

== History ==
Søborg Castle is first known from the 12th century, when ownership of the castle passed from the king to the Bishop of Roskilde. Bishop Valdemar was imprisoned at Søborg Castle from 1198 to 1206. Valdemar IV, Duke of Schleswig was confined at Søborg Castle in 1285–86.

Queen Margaret I of Denmark was born at the prison of Søborg Castle, where her father, King Valdemar IV of Denmark, had confined her mother, Helvig of Schleswig.

Traditionally, Archbishop Eskil of Lund is said to have expanded the previous buildings to a real castle with defensive walls and a moat. As Eskil was in close contact with Esrum Abbey, it is considered likely that he lived nearby at Søborgby. Saxo Grammaticus wrote that Eskil had built a castle in the den lethriske mose, but it is unknown whether that is a reference to Søborg. No-one has so far been able to make a clear connection between Eskil and Søborg either by archaeological finds or written sources. Such a connection is therefore a hypothesis only.

In the Middle Ages, the castle was on an island in a fjord with an outlet to the Kattegat by Gilleleje. Later, the fjord became Søborg Sø, which was drained 1872-1896 when a canal was dug to Gilleleje.

== Excavations ==
In 1985, Danish historian Robert Egevang (1939–2008) led an excavation of two trenches to determine the conditions between the octagon tower and the castle proper. A rampart approximately 11 metres (36 ft) wide is the oldest encirclement of the castle. Tiles have been found in the rampart, as well as in the octagon tower which was built at the same time. The excavations show that the castle proper was erected in the late 13th century, which would make it impossible that Eskil was the builder, as he died in 1181. The tiles are very unevenly made, evidence of their novelty in Denmark, after having only recently been introduced from Lombardy.

== Sources ==
- Skovgaard-Petersen, Inge, 1987: Da Tidernes Herre var nær. Studier i Saxos historiesyn. Den danske historiske Forening: Copenhagen
- Smidt, C.M., 1934: Ærkebiskop Eskils borganlæg på Söborg. Aarböger for nordisk Oldkyndighed
