= Gribskov Municipality =

Gribskov Municipality Gribskov Kommune (Danish)
- Municipality
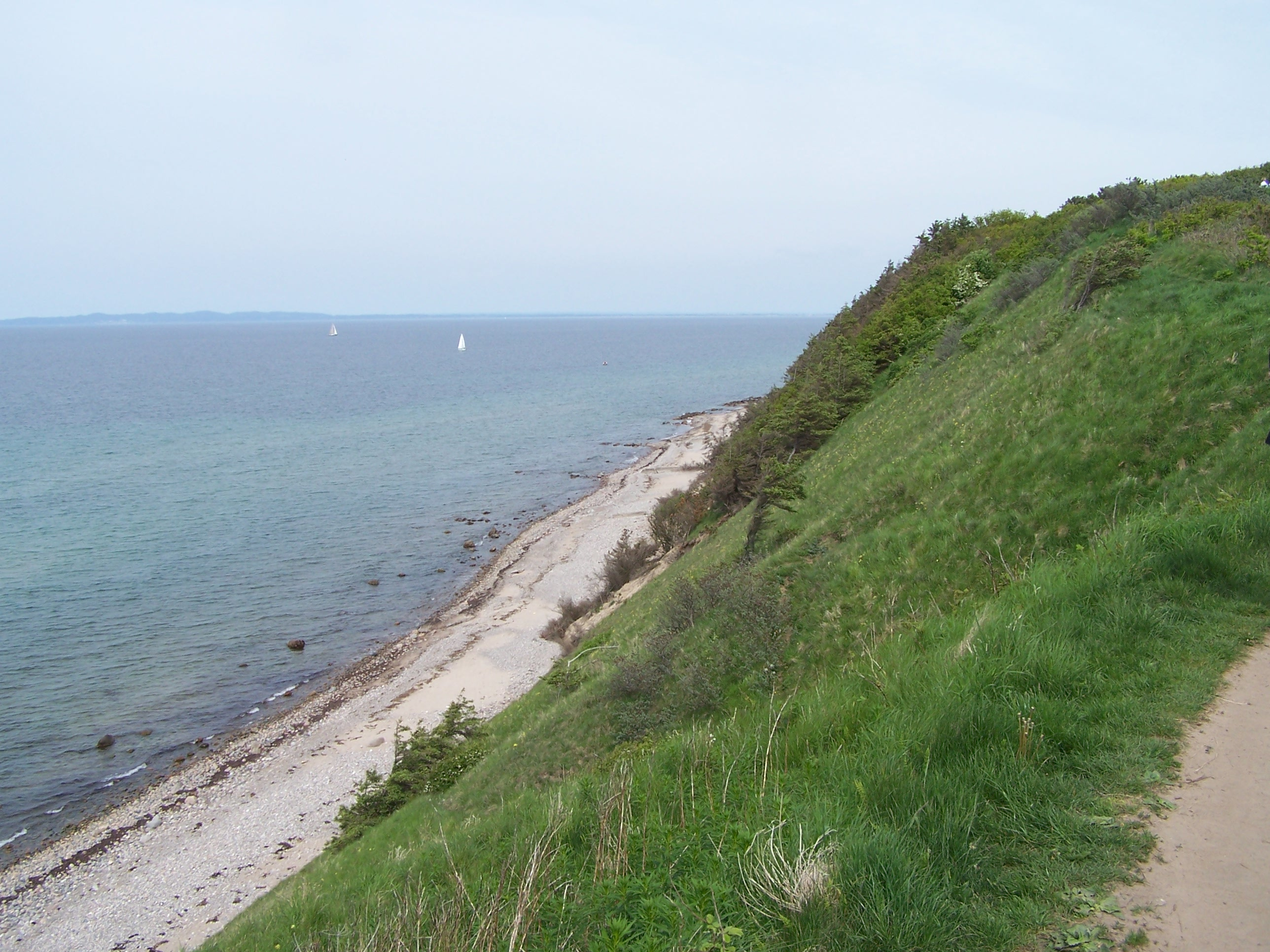
- The north coast of Zealand. Viewed from Gilleleje in Gribskov Municipality.

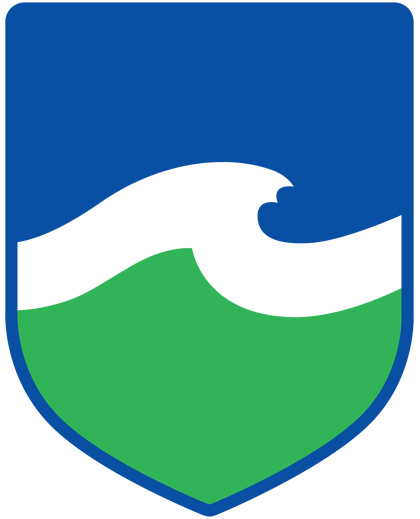
- Coat of arms

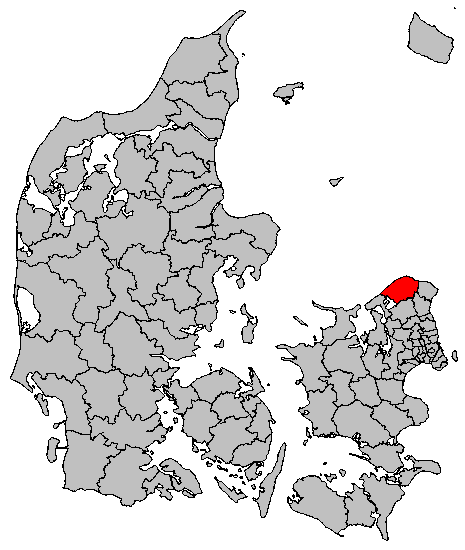
- Coordinates: 56°03′N 12°13′E
- Country: Denmark
- Region: Hovedstaden
- Established: 1 January 2007
- Seat: Helsinge

Government
  - Mayor: Anders Gerner Frost (Nytgribskov)

Area
  - Total: 278 km^{2} (107 sq mi)

Population (1. January 2026)
  - Total: 41,787
  - Density: 150/km^{2} (389/sq mi)
- Time zone: UTC+1 (CET)
  - Summer (DST): UTC+2 (CEST)
- Municipal code: 219
- Website: www.gribskov.dk

Gribskov Municipality (Danish: Gribskov Kommune) is a municipality (Danish, kommune) in the Capital Region of Denmark. The municipality covers an area of 278 km^{2}, and has a total population of 41,787.

The municipality was created on 1 January 2007 as a merger of the former municipalities of Græsted-Gilleleje and Helsinge. Its mayor as of 1 January 2018 is Anders Gerner Frost, a member of the local Nytgribskov political party.

== Locations ==
| Helsinge | 8,225 |
| Gilleleje | 6,658 |
| Græsted | 3,674 |
| Dronningmølle | 1,675 |
| Ramløse | 1,611 |
| Tisvilde | 1,560 |
| Smidstrup | 1,284 |
| Blistrup | 1,174 |

| Esbønderup | 1,143 |
| Vejby | 1,111 |
| Munkerup | 791 |
| Rågeleje | 762 |
| Kagerup | 406 |
| Annisse | 298 |
| Mårum | 223 |
| Søborg | 212 |

== Politics ==
=== Municipal council ===
Gribskov's municipal council consists of 23 members, elected every four years.

Below are the municipal councils elected since the Municipal Reform of 2007.

| Election | Party | | | | | | | | Total seats | Turnout | Elected mayor |
|---|---|---|---|---|---|---|---|---|---|---|---|
| Election | A | B | C | F | G | O | V | Ø | Total seats | Turnout | Elected mayor |
| 2005 | 5 | 1 | 1 | 3 | | 2 | 14 | 1 | 27 | 70.4% | Jannich Petersen (V) |
| 2009 | 6 | | 2 | 4 | | 2 | 9 | | 23 | 69.2% | Jan Ferdinandsen (C) |
| 2013 | 5 | | 1 | | 4 | 2 | 10 | 1 | 23 | 75.3% | Kim Valentin (V) |
| 2017 | 5 | | 2 | | 6 | 2 | 7 | 1 | 23 | 73.5% | Anders Gerner Frost (G) |
Data from Kmdvalg.dk 2005, 2009, 2013 and 2017

== Attractions ==
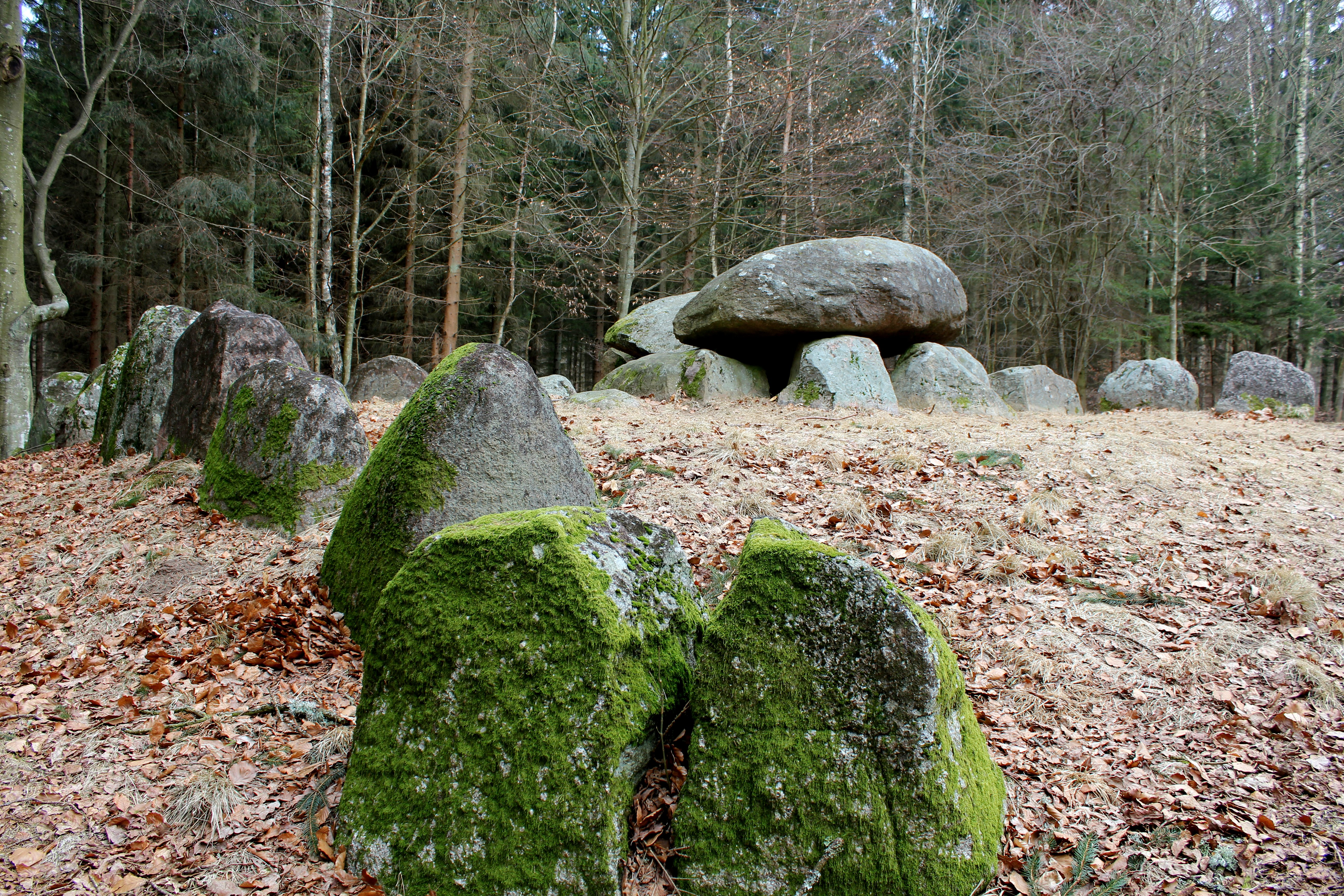
One of the seven long barrows at Valby Hegn.

There is a large concentration of dolmens and tumuli within the municipality.

Of special mention is 'Valby Hegn', a small plantation close to Helsinge and Gribskov and home to no less than seven long barrows from the Neolithic Stone Age.

Other interesting sites includes:

- Rudolph Tegner Museum
- Munkeruphus
- Asserbo Charterhouse
- Søborg Castle
- Esrum Abbey
- Tisvilde Hegn
- Gribskov

== Sources and references ==
- Municipal statistics: NetBorger Kommunefakta, delivered from KMD aka Kommunedata (Municipal Data)
- Municipal mergers and neighbors: Eniro new municipalities map
