= Hans Holst =

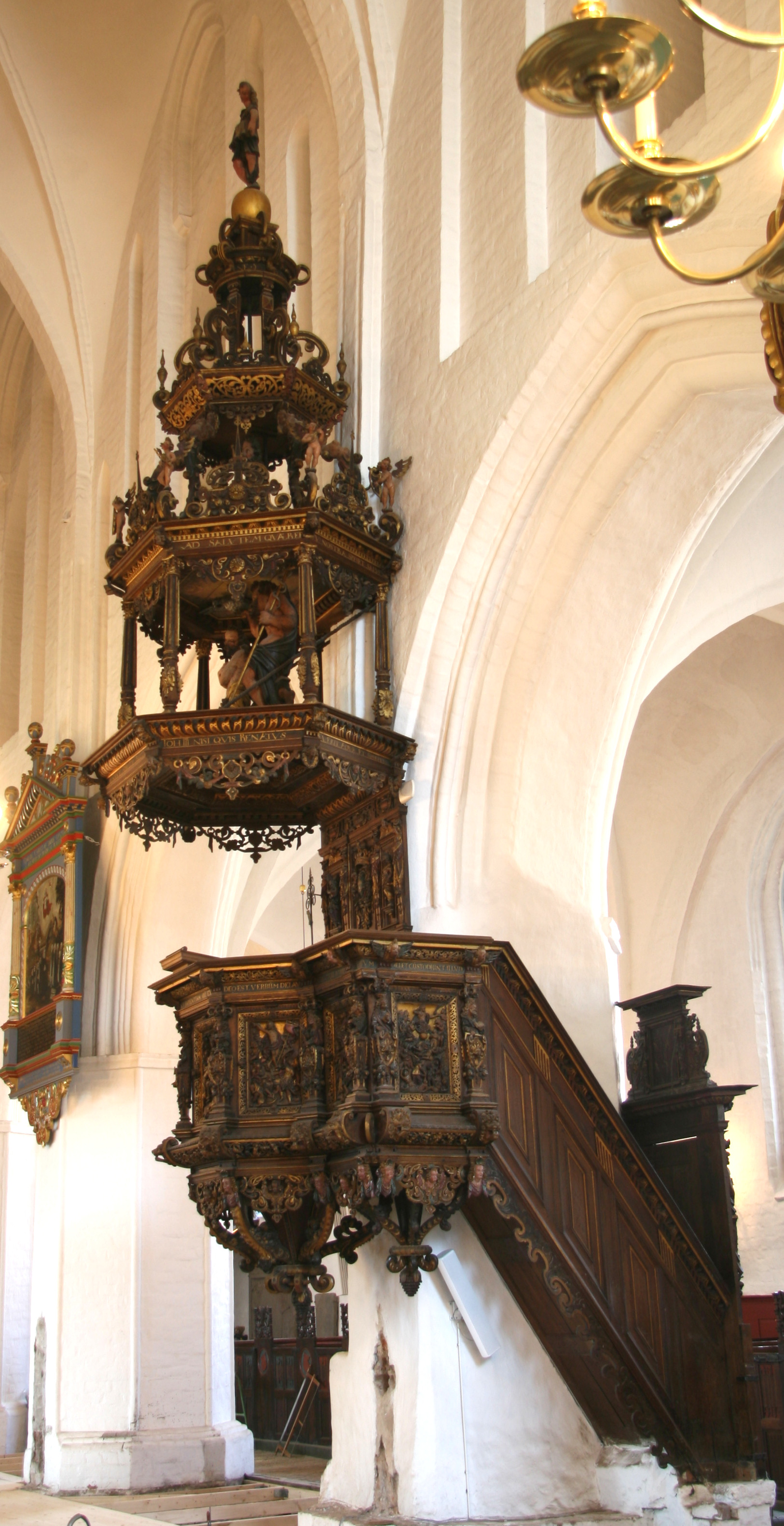
Pulpit (1624), St Nicholas Church, Køge

Hans Holst (born before 1619, died after 1640) was a Danish woodcarver associated with Køge where he designed the pews (in association with his brother Jochum) and the pulpit in St Nicholas Church.

== Background ==
From the 1550s to the 1650s, master craftsmen from northern Germany as well as the then Danish provinces of Schleswig and Holstein were invited to eastern Denmark to decorate churches and castles. By the mid-17th century, the region had experienced a period of unexcelled richness in artistic carving in the Baroque style with auricular decorations. Major participants included Lorentz Jørgensen in Holbæk, Jørgen Ringnis in Nakskov, Abel Schrøder in Næstved, Claus Gabriel in Hillerød, Casper Lubekke in Roskilde and Hans Holst himself.

== Biography ==
Holst, the son of "old Hans Holst" (died 1623) who was a carpenter in Køge, is listed in Køge's municipal accounts as having worked with his brother Jochum from 1619 to 1623 on the pews in St Nicholas Church. The pulpit in the same church, which bears his signature, shows he was one of the finest woodcarvers of the period. Holst was also active in Copenhagen where he received several assignments from the university for decorative carving in churches in the area. He designed an altarpiece for the Church of Our Lady (destroyed by fire in 1728) and for pulpits in the churches of Sæby and Ganløse (both completed in 1624). The pulpits in Ejby and Haraldsted have also been attributed to him. He was paid for less important work in Smørum Church up to 1640.
