= Jørgen Ringnis =

Danish woodcarver (died 1652)

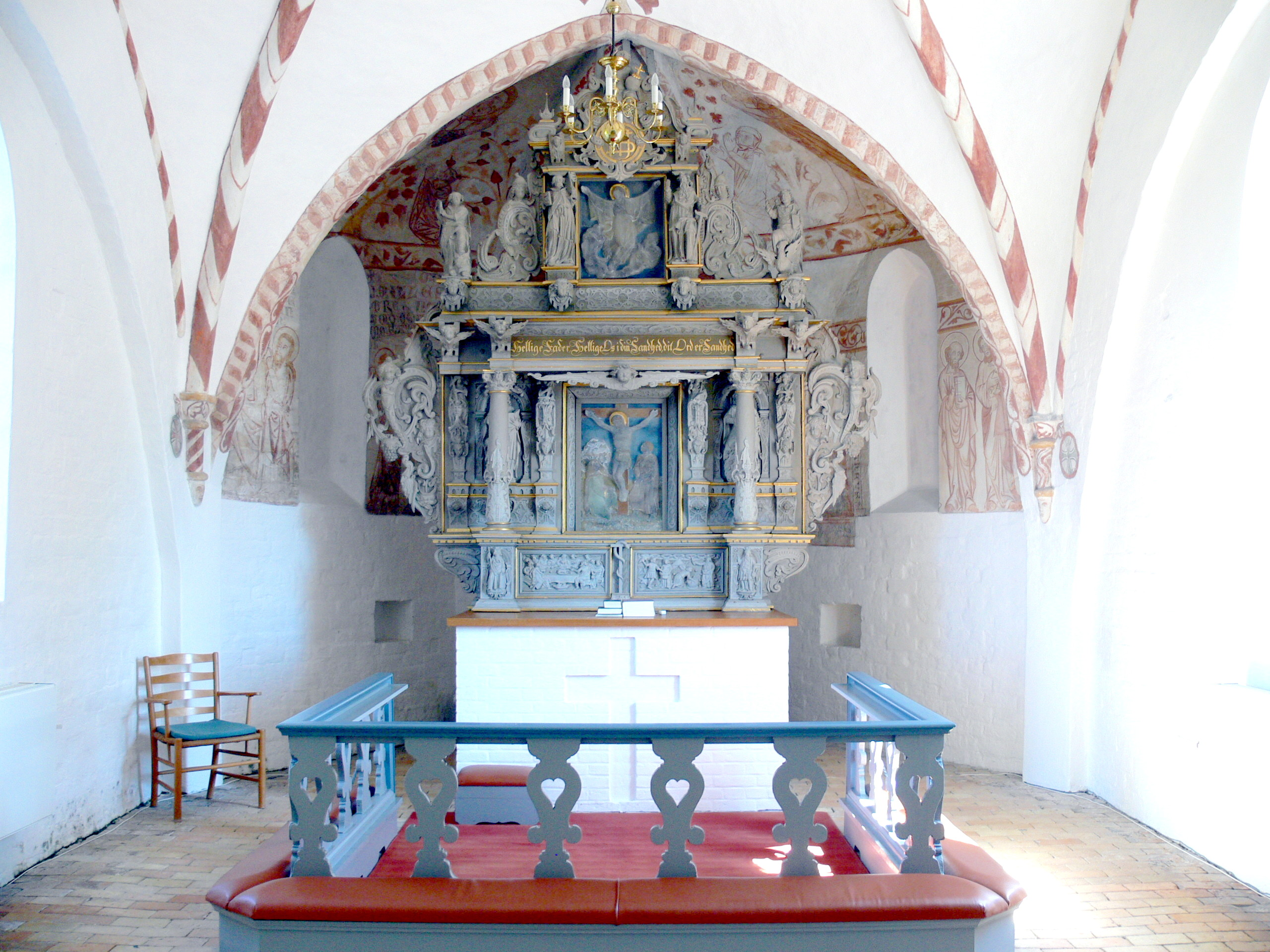
Jørgen Ringnis: Altarpiece in Nørre Alslev Church (1653)

Jørgen Ringnis, also known as "Jørgen Billedsnider", (birth unknown, died 1652 in Nakskov) was a Danish woodcarver. He created a number of altarpieces and pulpits in Danish churches, especially on the islands of Lolland and Falster.

== Background ==
From the 1550s to the 1650s, master craftsmen from northern Germany as well as the then Danish provinces of Schleswig and Holstein were invited to eastern Denmark to decorate churches and castles. By the mid-17th century, the region had experienced a period of unexcelled richness in artistic carving in the Baroque style. Major participants included Lorentz Jørgensen in Holbæk, Abel Schrøder in Næstved, Hans Holst in Køge, Claus Gabriel in Hillerød, Casper Lubekke in Roskilde and Jørgen Ringnis himself.

== Biography ==
In style and presentation, Ringnis' works resemble those of the Flensburg master, Heinrich Ringerinck, who is therefore considered to have been his tutor. Furthermore, in one of his contracts he gave his name as Rincknis, indicating he may have originated from Rinkenæs on Flensburg Firth. The earliest work bearing his signature is the pulpit (1630) in Nakskov Church where he also created the organ gallery. Like the pulpits in Nykøbing (1640) and Stubbekøbing (1634), it was paid for by local merchants and their families. His bills show that in 1631 he was living in Maribo while in 1637 and 1640 he was in Nakskov. His work comprises 23 pulpits and eight altarpieces which, apart from his pulpits in Oksbøl and Nordborg on the island of Als, are all to be found on Lolland or, in particular, on Falster. He often created an altarpiece and a pulpit for the same church.

== Style ==
Ringnis work can be recognized by his elaborate auricular style in a high Renaissance framework. His older pulpits have reliefs with scenes from the Old and New Testaments, similar to those of Ringerinck, but starting with the Kippinge pulpit (1631), they are replaced by the figures of the Evangelists. The quality and nature of Ringnis' work remained constant throughout his practice over a period of some 30 years. His pupils continued to emulate his style creating works in the churches of Falster, southern Zealand and Møn.

== Gallery ==
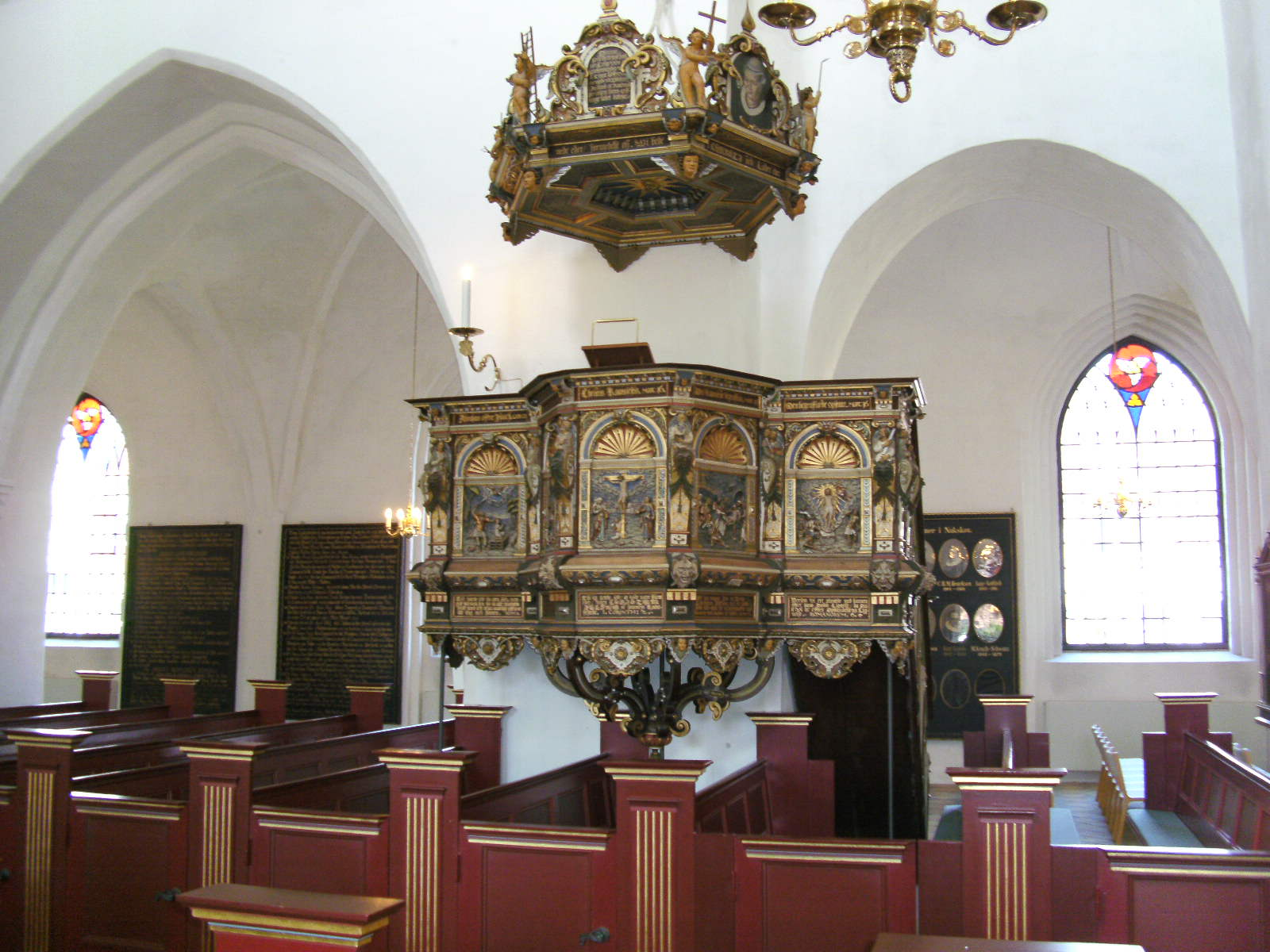
Nakskov pulpit (1630)

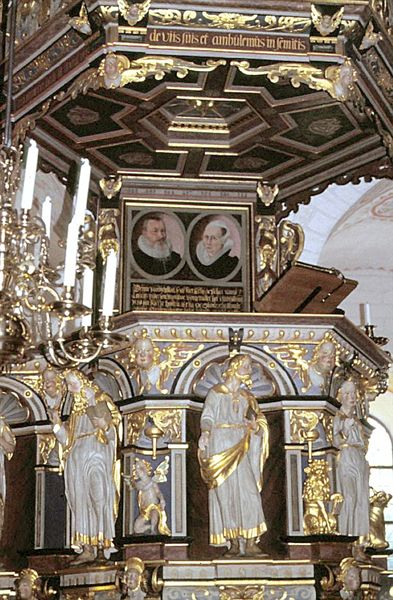
Stubbekøbing pulpit (1634)

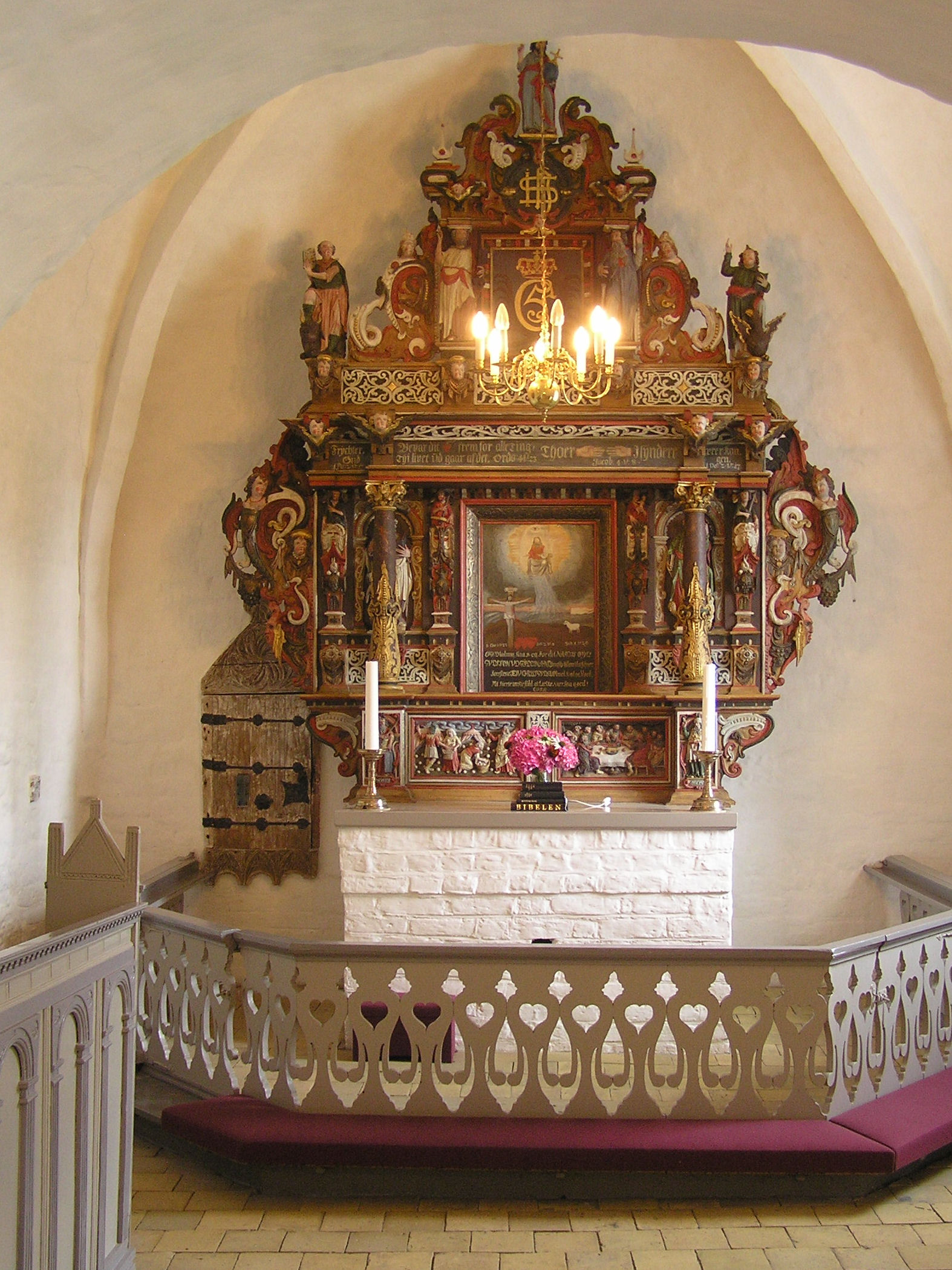
Torkilstrup altarpiece (1650)

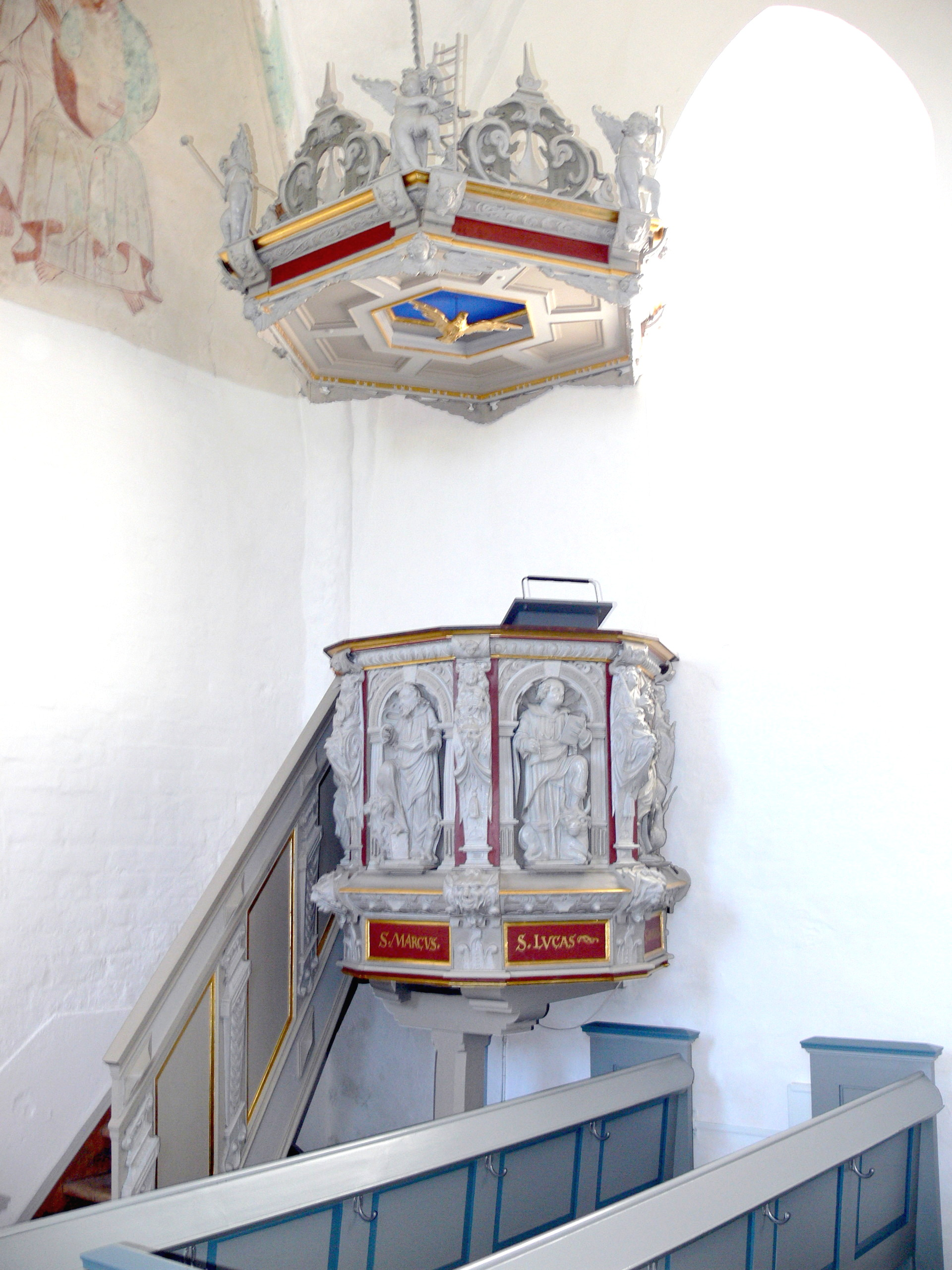
Nørre Alslev pulpit (1643)
