= St. Olaf's Church, Helsingør =

Coordinates: 56°02′08″N 12°36′51″E

Cathedral of St Olaf
- Sankt Olai Domkirke
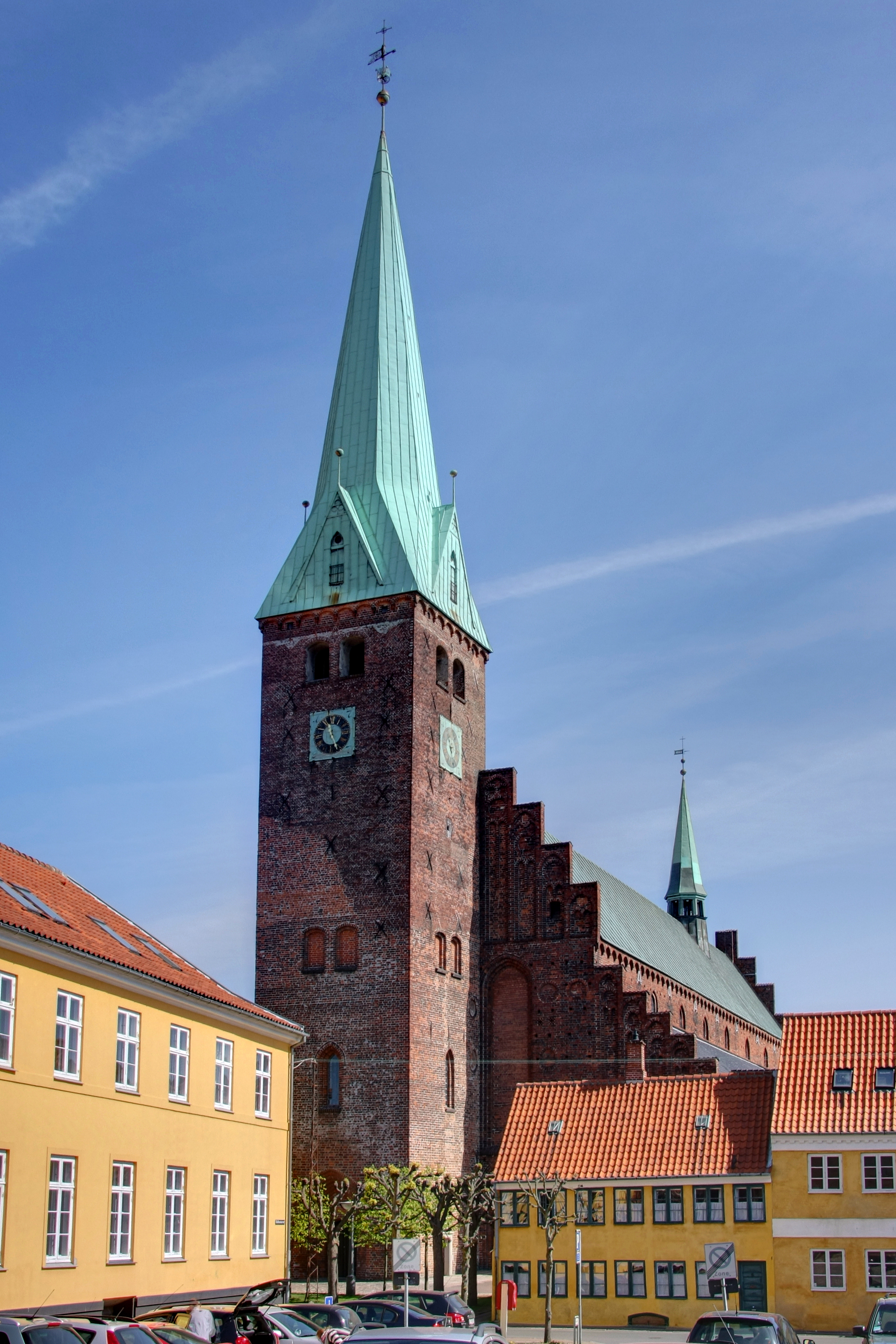
- Cathedral of St Olaf
- Location: Helsingør
- Country: Denmark
- Denomination: Church of Denmark
- Previous denomination: Catholic Church
- Website: Official web site

History
- Status: Cathedral
- Dedication: St Olaf

Architecture
- Completed: 1559

Administration
- Diocese: Helsingør

Clergy
- Bishop: Lise-Lotte Rebel
- Vicar: Anders Kingo
- Dean: Steffen Ravn Jørgensen

Saint Olaf's Church (Danish: Sankt Olai Kirke) is the cathedral church of Helsingør in the north of Zealand, Denmark. With a history going back to around 1200, the present building was completed in 1559. In 1961, the church was given the status of cathedral in connection with the establishment of the Diocese of Helsingør.

== History ==
The church was dedicated to Saint Olaf of Norway. Mentioned for the first time in 1295, the original small Romanesque church was probably built at the beginning of the 13th century. Helsingør developed rapidly after Eric of Pomerania introduced customs fees in the 1420s for ships sailing through the Øresund, soon becoming one of Denmark's largest market towns. The church is mentioned in several late 15th-century documents in connection with Johan Oxe's Chapel and, later, the inscription on the alarm bell in 1511. When the church was rededicated in 1521, possibly after a fire, Saint Andrew and Saint Vincent are mentioned as patron saints. After the Reformation, Saint Olaf's gained a reputation as a Catholic stronghold, a Protestant priest saying in 1536 he was unable to take up his appointment there.

Many of the ships passing Helsingør were British as a community of Scots settled in town in the early 16th century. They had an altar dedicated to Saint Jacob, Saint Andrew and the Scottish Saint Ninian in Saint Olaf's. It is mentioned in 1511 but had disappeared by 1858, although it was stated that the hospital should reserve a bed for a Scot in need. The altar is now kept in the National Museum.

In connection with the church's completion from 1557 to 1561, work was carried out on the vaulting and heightening the tower, as well as on the inclusion of several altars inside the church. In 1559, the king gave the burghers of Helsingør an altarpiece from Esrum Monastery. After suffering from the cost of a spire in 1614, the church received financial support from the Crown. In 1782, it was stated in a letter from the Crown that Saint Olaf's should become the main church for all the Danish citizens of the town while Saint Mary's Church should be the church for Germans. This in fact only confirmed a situation which had existed since at least 1586. On 1 January 1961, Saint Olaf's became the cathedral church of the Diocese of Helsingør.

== Architecture ==
The original Romanesque building, no bigger than a small village church, consisted of a chancel and a nave. Remains of its old decorations can still be seen on the nave's north wall. In the early 15th century, the church was extended westwards in the Gothic style, including a tower at the west end with stepped gables. The Trinity Chapel, a burial chapel for the Oxe family was completed c. 1475. Shortly afterwards, work probably started on widening the building and replacing the chancel. A sacristy was also added. In 1521, the new chancel was consecrated but work on the new church was not completed until 1559 with the last stage of the vaulted nave and a taller tower. The porch was added in 1579 and a tall, slender spire (known as the Virgin of Helsingør) was fitted in 1615. It blew down in a hurricane in 1737, destroying the porch. Although it was later restored, today's spire was designed by H.B. Storck in 1898. The present rectangular red-brick basilica consists of a high-roofed nave, flanked by two lower aisles, allowing the building to be illuminated by windows lining the upper walls of the nave. In addition to the tower at the west end, there is a porch on the south side of the building while the Trinity Chapel and the sacristy extend towards the north. Of special note are the beautifully decorated stepped gables. The spire, the roof of the nave and the gutters are copper-plated. The tower is 105 meters high.

== Interior ==
The church is exceptionally well decorated with two small Dutch alabaster altarpieces donated by Birgitte Gøye and Herluf Trolle (on either side of the main altar), a carved pulpit created by Jaspar Matiessen in 1567 with a canopy from 1624, and a Baroque altarpiece (c. 1664) designed by Lorentz Jørgensen in the auricular style. Also of note are the Baroque rood screen (1653) and the wrought iron baptismal font (donated in 1579). There are also a number of frescoes in the church, notably the decorative painting with flowers and leaves on the nave's fourth vault, dated to the mid-16th century.

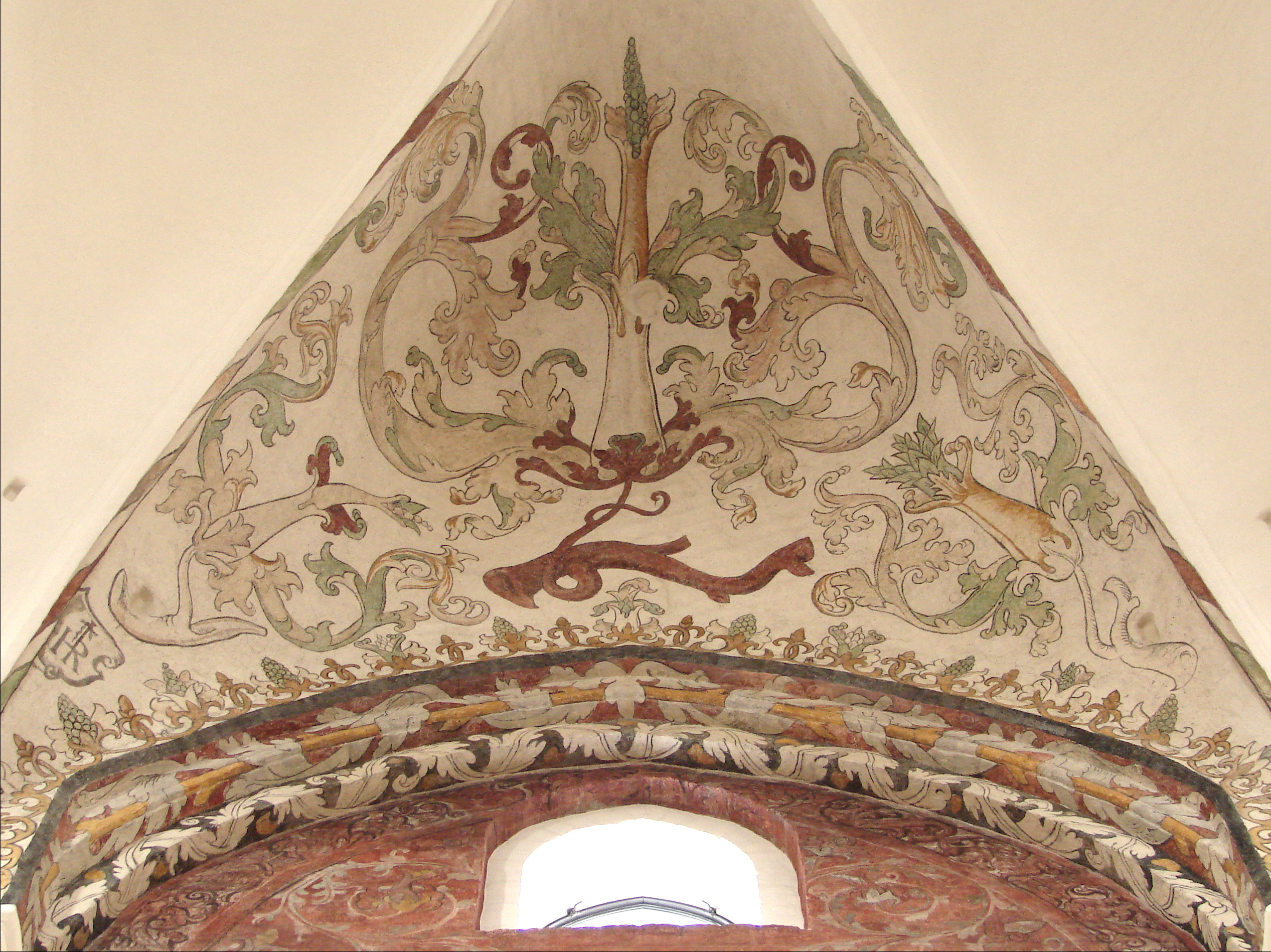
Fresco in the fourth nave vault (mid 16th century)

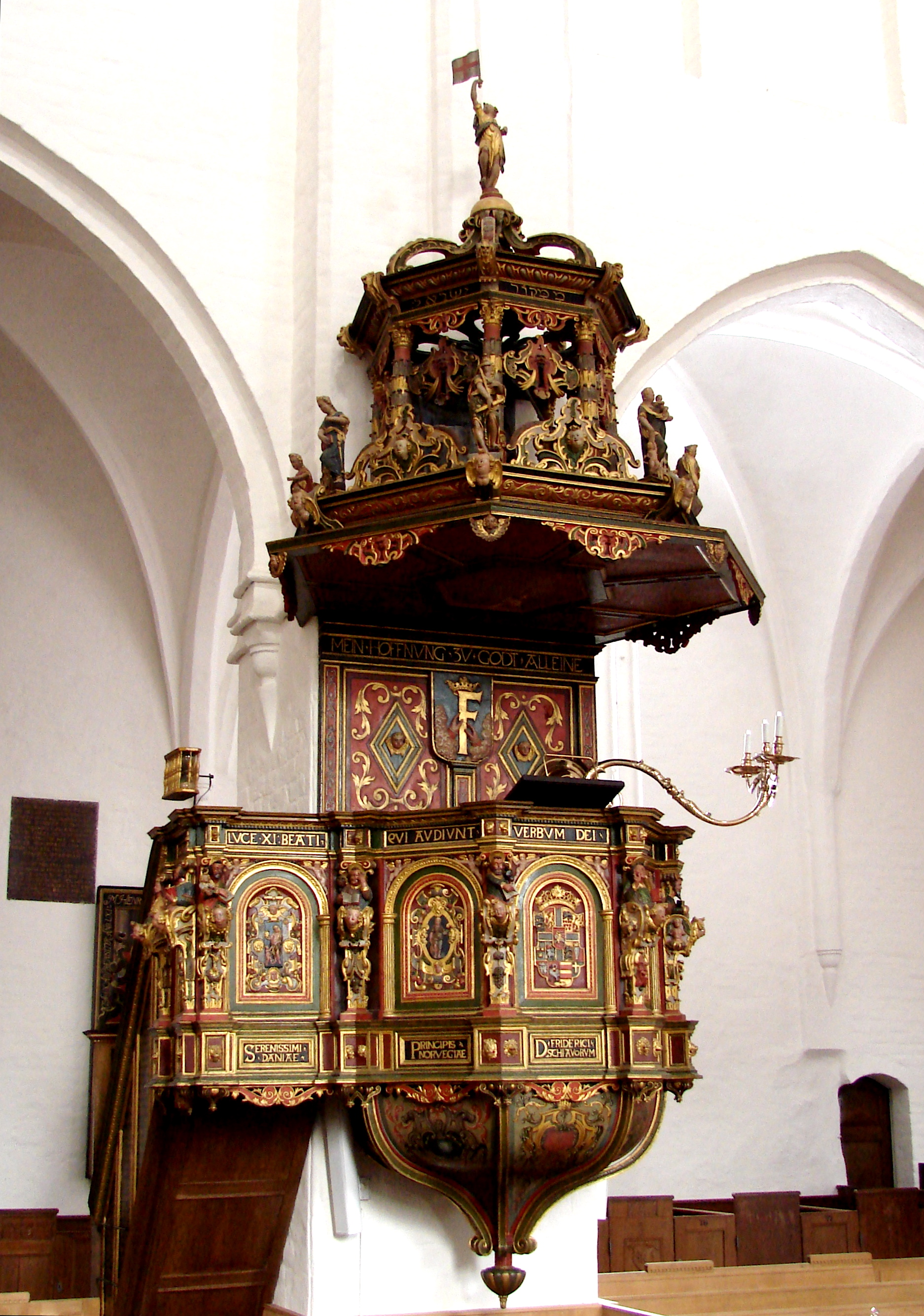
Pulpit (1567)

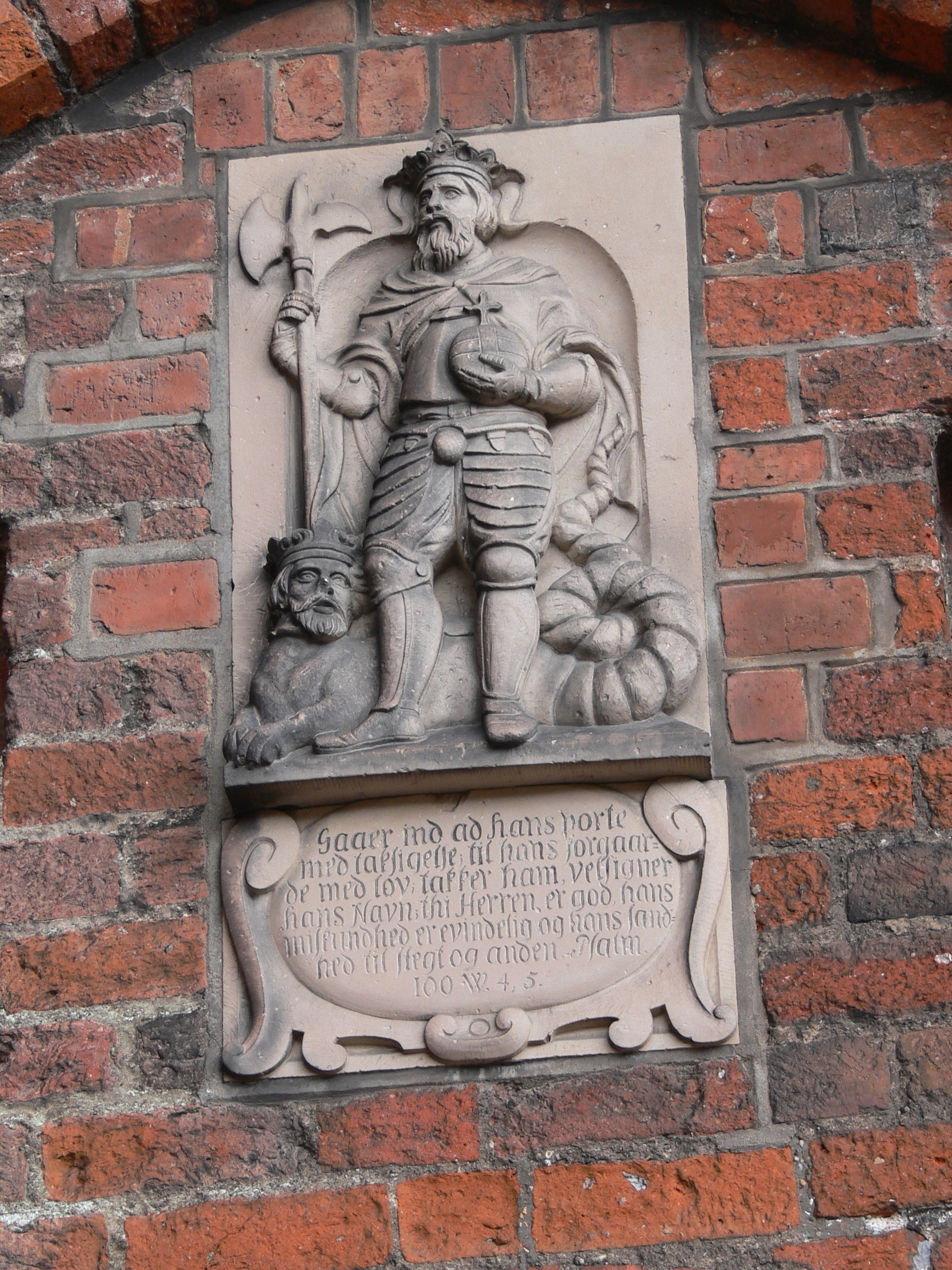
Relief of Saint Olaf (1645)

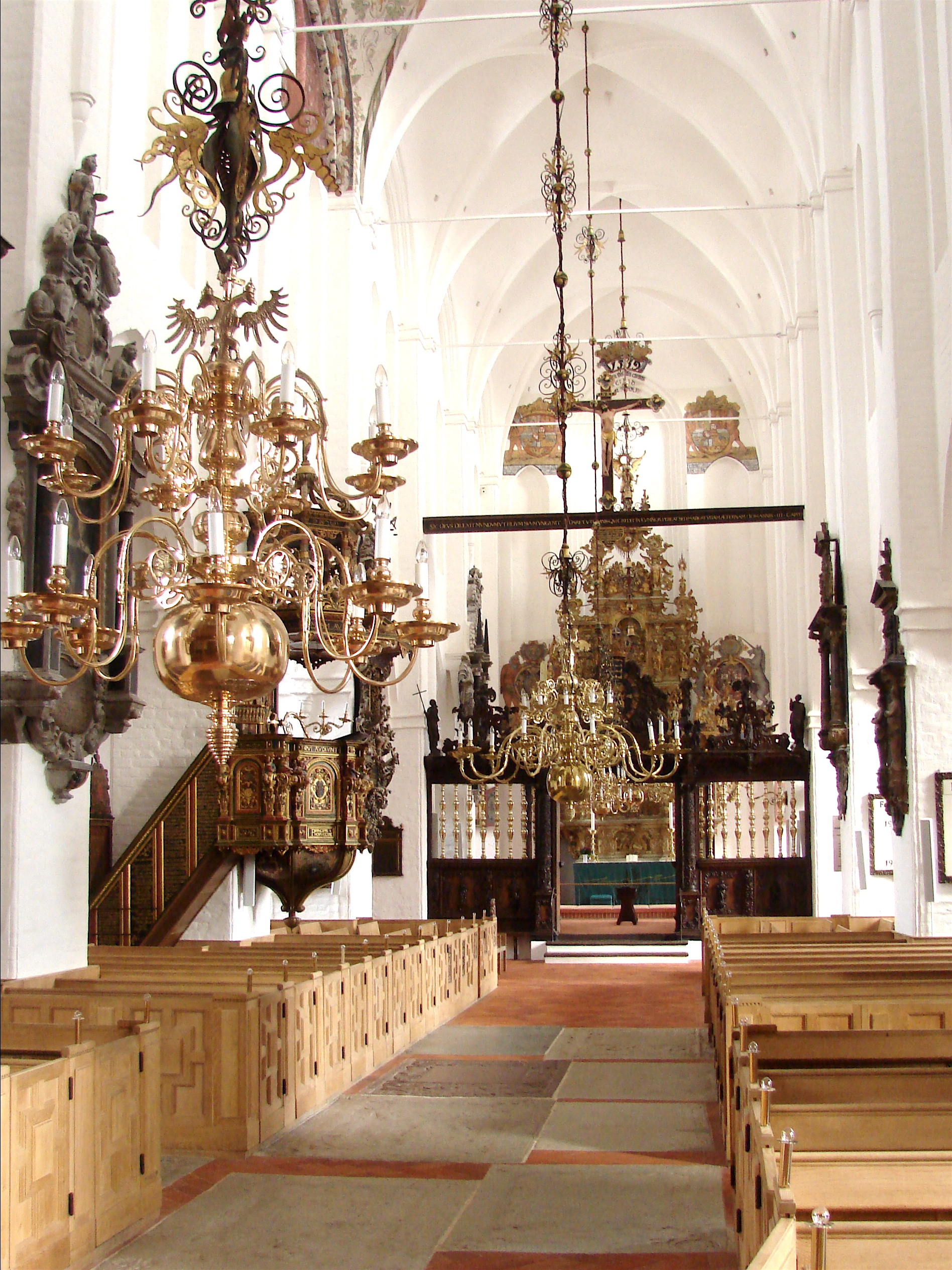
Nave

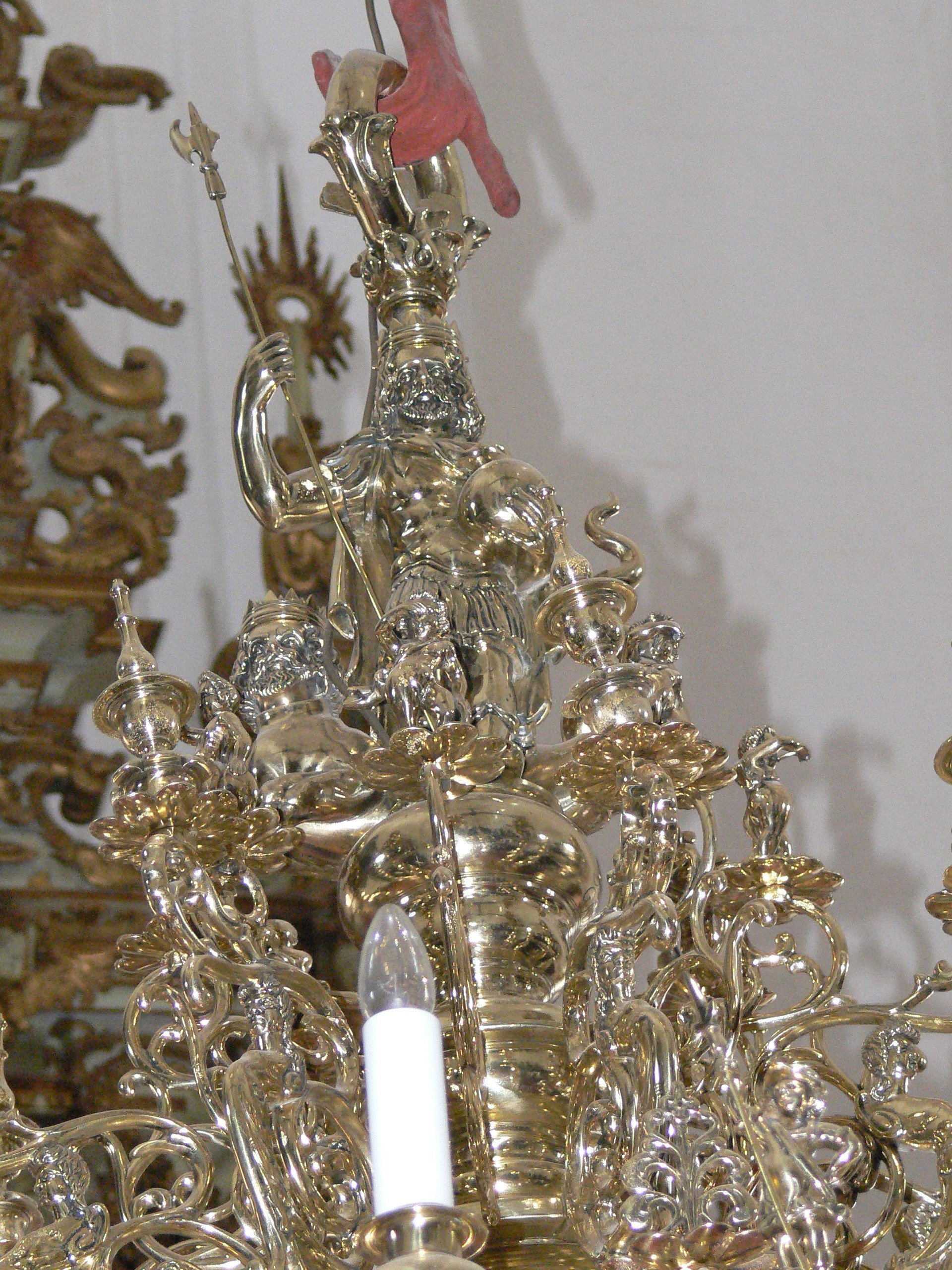
Chandelier with the sculpture of Saint Olav (1662)

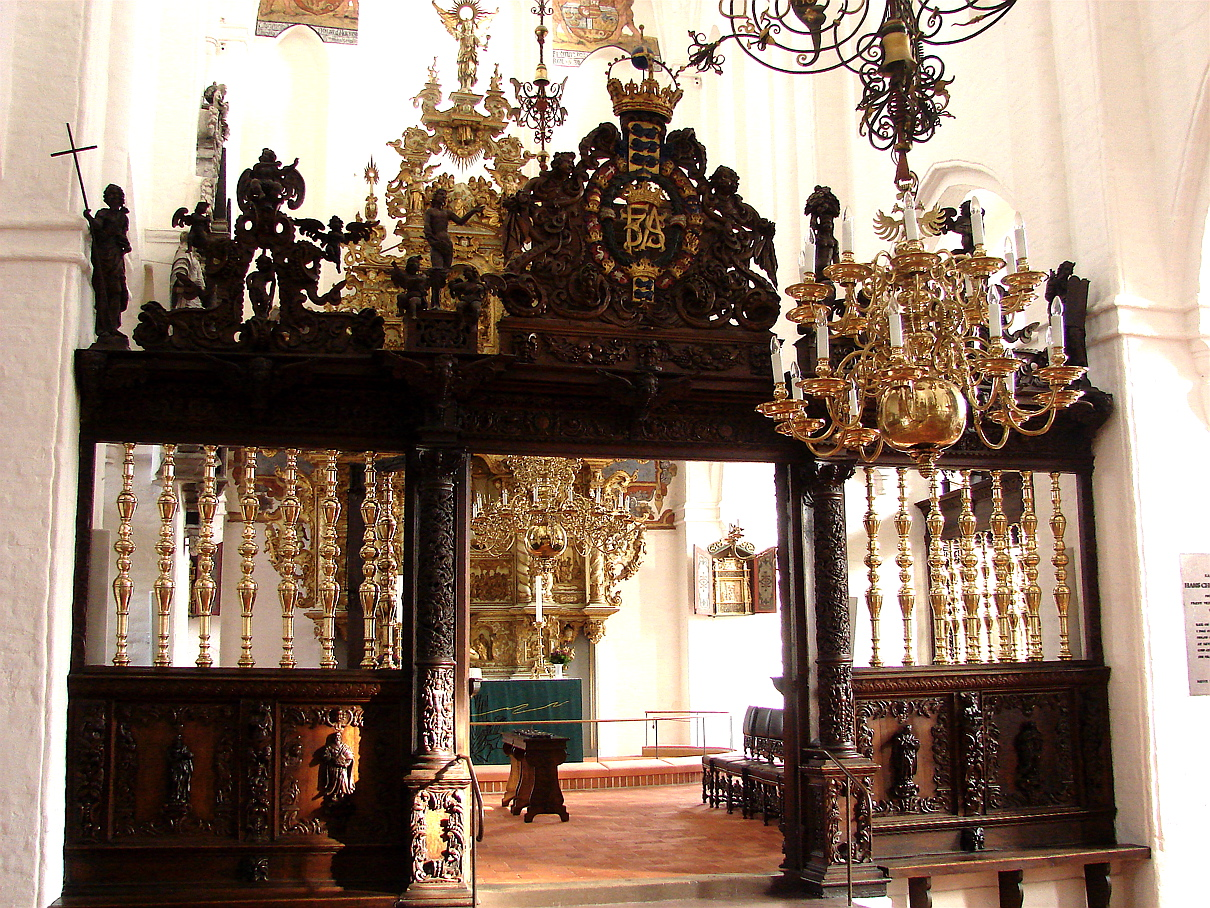
Rood screen (1653)
