= Lise-Lotte Rebel =

Danish bishop

The Right Reverend Lise-Lotte Rebel
- Bishop of Helsingør
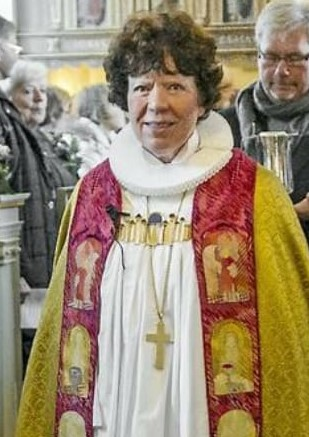
- Church: Church of Denmark
- Diocese: Diocese of Helsingør
- Elected: 1995
- In office: 1995–2021
- Predecessor: Johannes Johansen
- Successor: Peter Birch

Orders
- Ordination: 1978
- Consecration: 2 April 1995

Personal details
- Born: 23 January 1951 (age 75) Kongens Lyngby, Denmark
- Denomination: Lutheran

Lise-Lotte Rebel (born 23 January 1951) is a bishop of the Church of Denmark. Between 1995 and 2021, she served as the bishop of the Diocese of Helsingør in the Evangelical Lutheran Church of Denmark. She was the first woman to become a bishop in the Church of Denmark.

== Biography ==
Rebel studied theology at the University of Copenhagen in 1978. She was then appointed as pastor of Utterslev Church between 1978 and 1980. In 1980 she was transferred to Islev Church until 1987 when she was appointed as pastor of Helsingør Cathedral. She stayed in this position until her election as bishop of the same diocese in 1995.

Lise-Lotte Rebel was awarded the Order of the Dannebrog in 1996 and in 2001 became a Knight of the Order of the Dannebrog. On 1 January 2014 she became the Commander of the Order. She retired in 2021.
