= Vester Egesborg Church =

Vester Egesborg Church Vester Egesborg Kirke
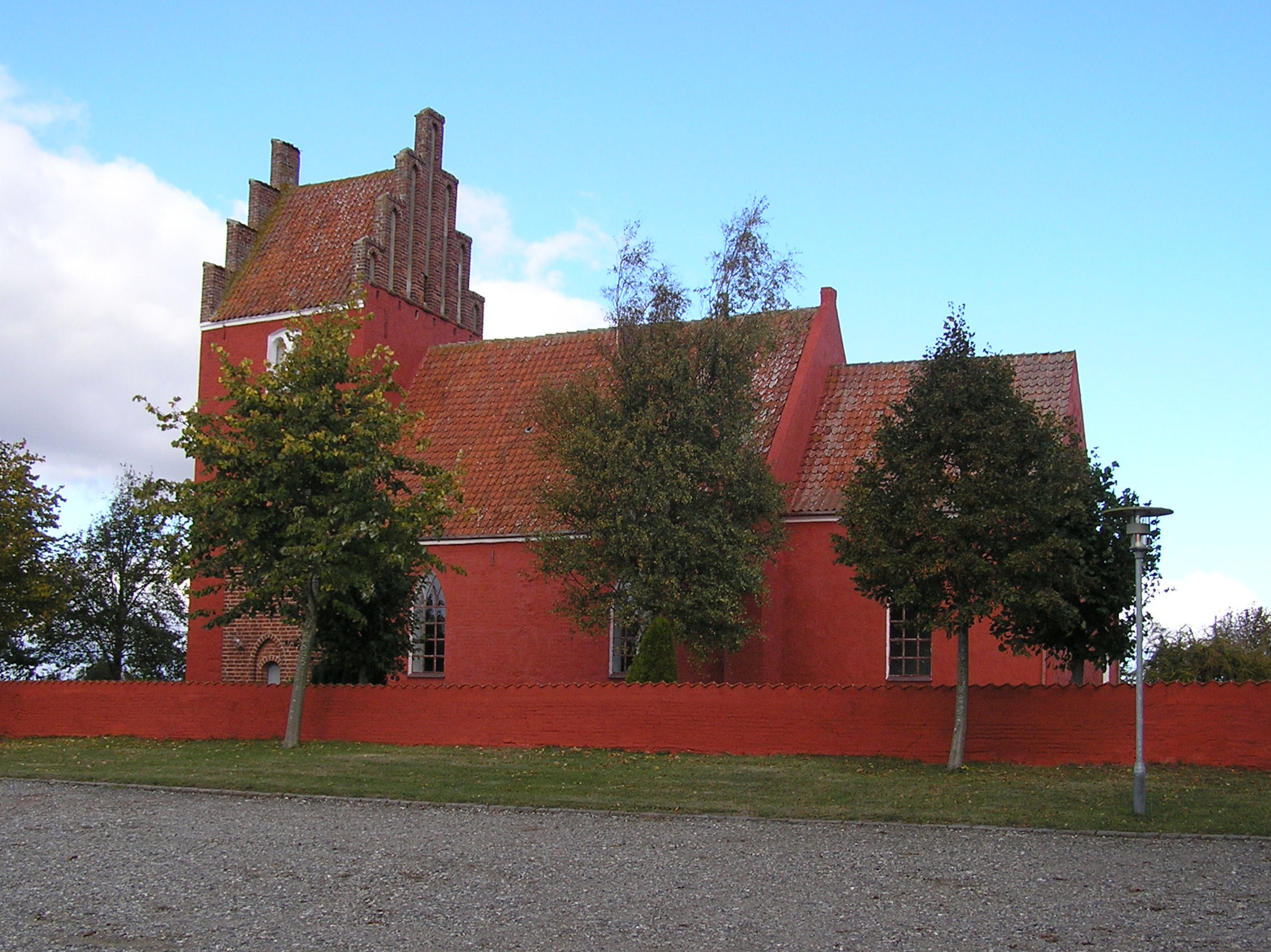
- Vester Egesborg Church
- Vester Egesborg Church; Vester Egesborg Kirke
- 55°9′28″N 11°49′8″E
- Location: Næstved
- Country: Denmark
- Denomination: Church of Denmark
- Previous denomination: Catholic

History
- Founded: 1250-1300

Architecture
- Functional status: Functional
- Style: Early Gothic; Late Gothic; Baroque

Administration
- Division: Næstved Municipality
- District: Region Zealand

Vester Egesborg Church (Danish: Vester Egesborg Kirke) is located in Næstved Municipality of Region Zealand, Denmark. It was built in 1250–1300, with the addition of the tower and vestry around 1500. The choir was rebuilt at the end of the 18th century. The pulpit and altarpiece were carved around the middle of the 17th century by Abel Schrøder in the auricular style. The wrought iron baptismal font from the 1670s bears the arms of Niels Trolle and Helle Rosenkrantz. A farmer, John Jensen, believed that a church should also have a ship, so with his wife, he bequeathed money for that purpose; Neptunus hangs from the ceiling of the church.

The exterior faces of the church are in red brick with a stepped gable. It is located at a distance of about 3 miles (4.8 km) to the north of Kong where there is another church.

== Features ==
The church was built in the early Gothic style in brick masonry over a partially existing structure. However, the tower was built in the late Gothic period with a vestry facing the north and with cross vaults. The chancel was fully rebuilt in 1780 but the old Gothic arch was preserved. The elaborately carved Baroque altarpiece (1669) was made in the workshop of Abel Schrøder in Næstved. The altarpiece has a large central scene of the Last Supper flanked by the Evangelists. The side panels have depictions of the Baptism, Birth, Bearing the Cross and Gethsemane. The top section contains a scene of the Crucifixion and the monograms of Frederik III and Sophie Amalie. It also bears the carved arms of Frederick Reedtz. The pedestal depicts the Washing of the Feet flanked by Peter and Paul. The altarpiece is similar to that in Vejlø Church.

Frederick Reedtz, the lensmand or vassal responsible for Vordingborg, an important figure in the area, paid for the altarpiece and the pulpit crafted in carved oak by the Schrøder workshop. The pulpit (1632) is decorated with the figures of the Evangelists while the canopy bears Christian IV's monogram and the arms of Frederick Reedtz. The wrought iron font from the 1670s displays the arms of Niels Trolle and Lisa Rosenkrantz. Altarpieces, pulpits and chairs and gables all bear the Reedtz arms.

Within the church premises there are tombstones and epitaphs for the Frederick Reedtz who was buried here. Some of the headstones are dated from 1450 to 1600. The oldest headstone shows two coats of arms and the later ones, of Frederick Reedtz and his wife, show 16. There are epitaphs of both sandstone and wood.

== Festival ==
Candlemass, with the Latin name "Missa candelarum", is an old Catholic custom that has been revived in a number of Danish churches. The celebration in Vester Egesborg is on 3 February 2013, bringing light on the "coldest day" with music by a number of young artists from Næstved.

== Gallery ==
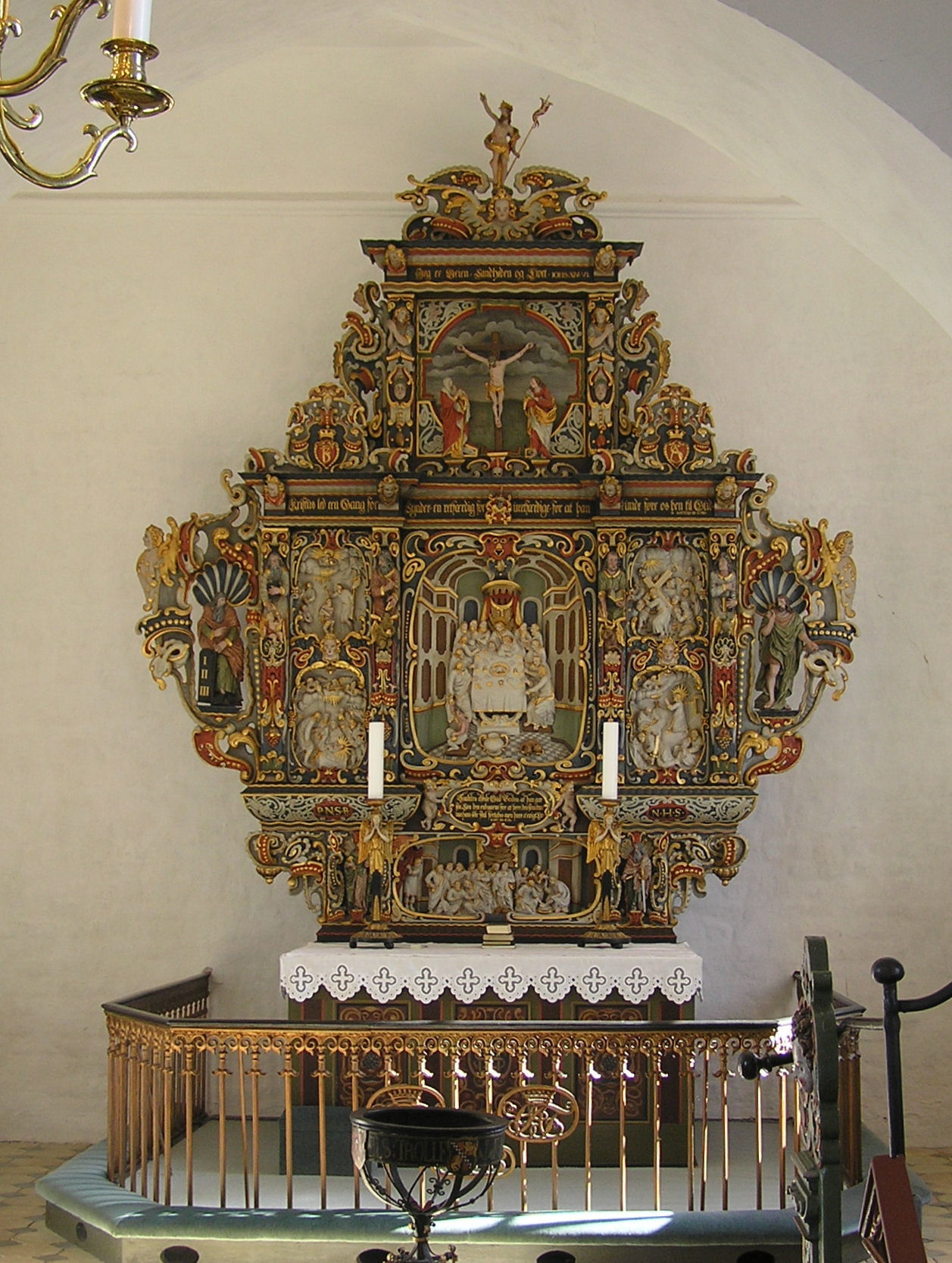
Altar

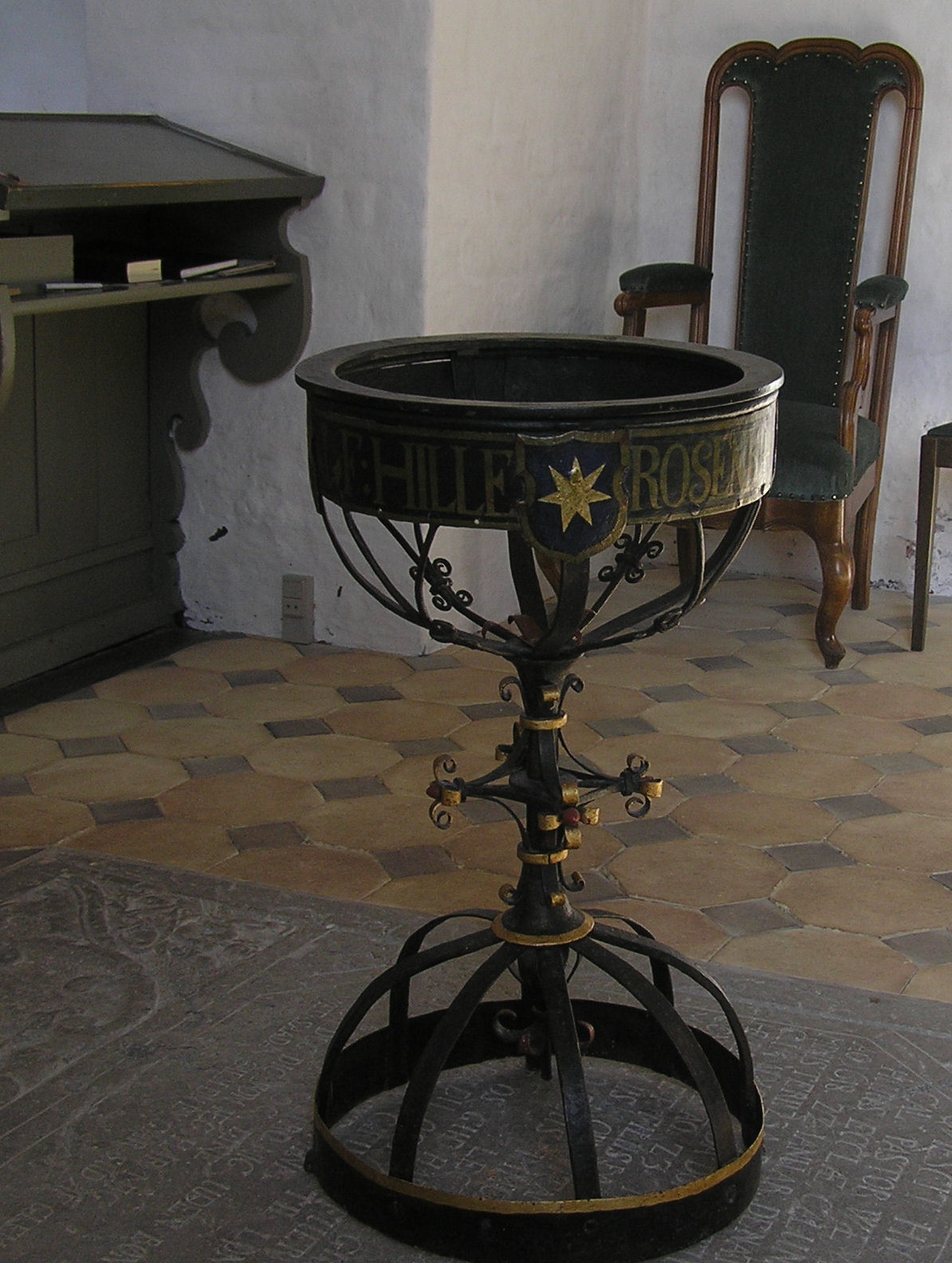
Baptismal font

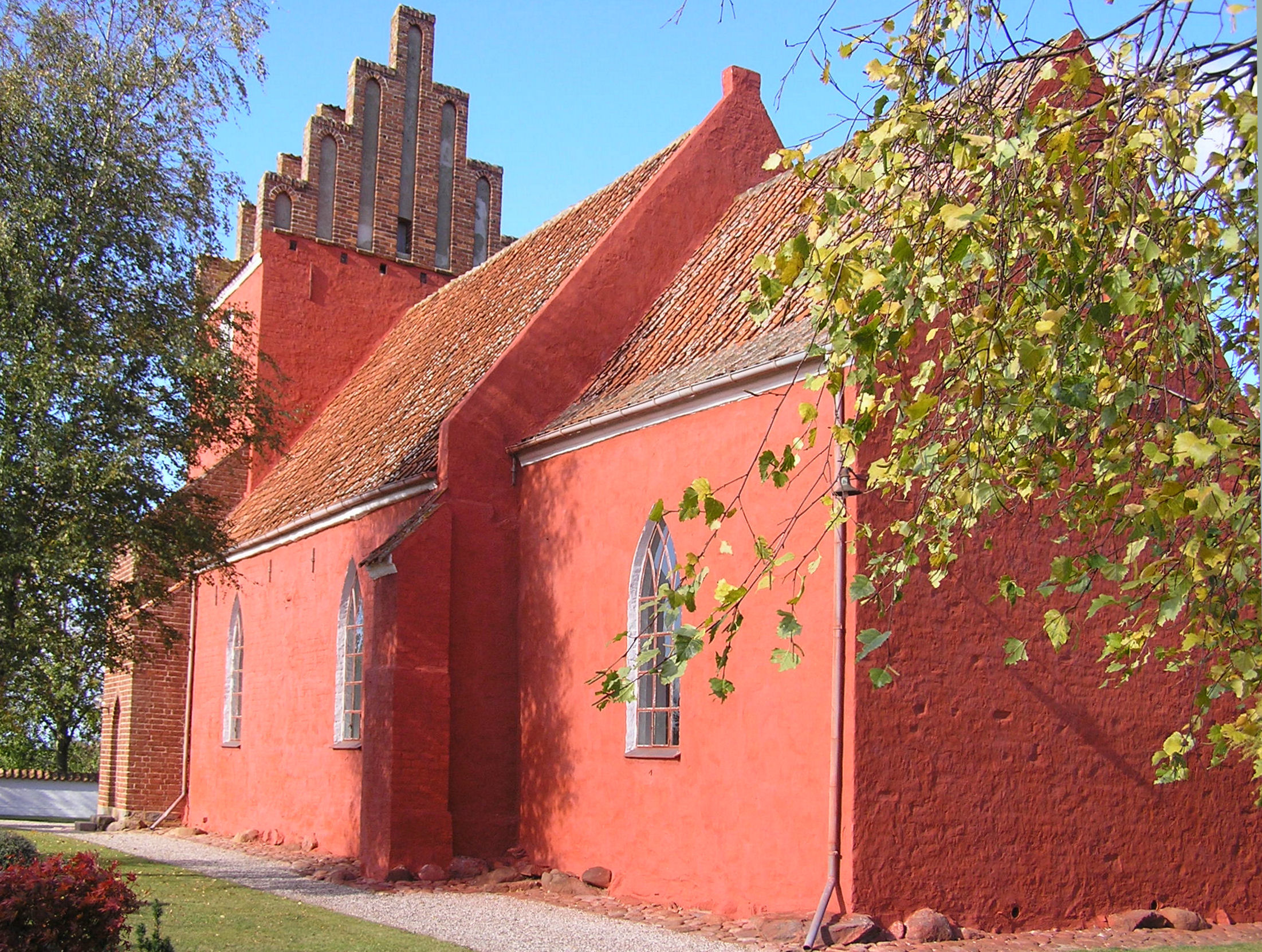
Another view of the church

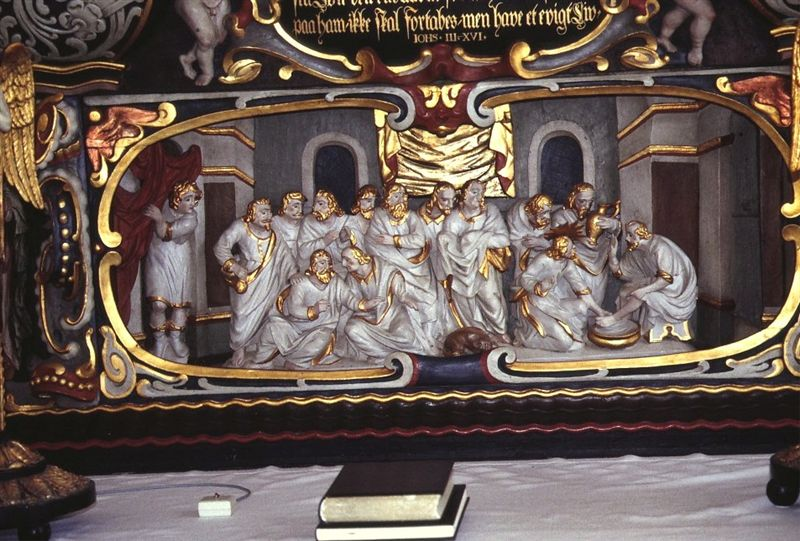

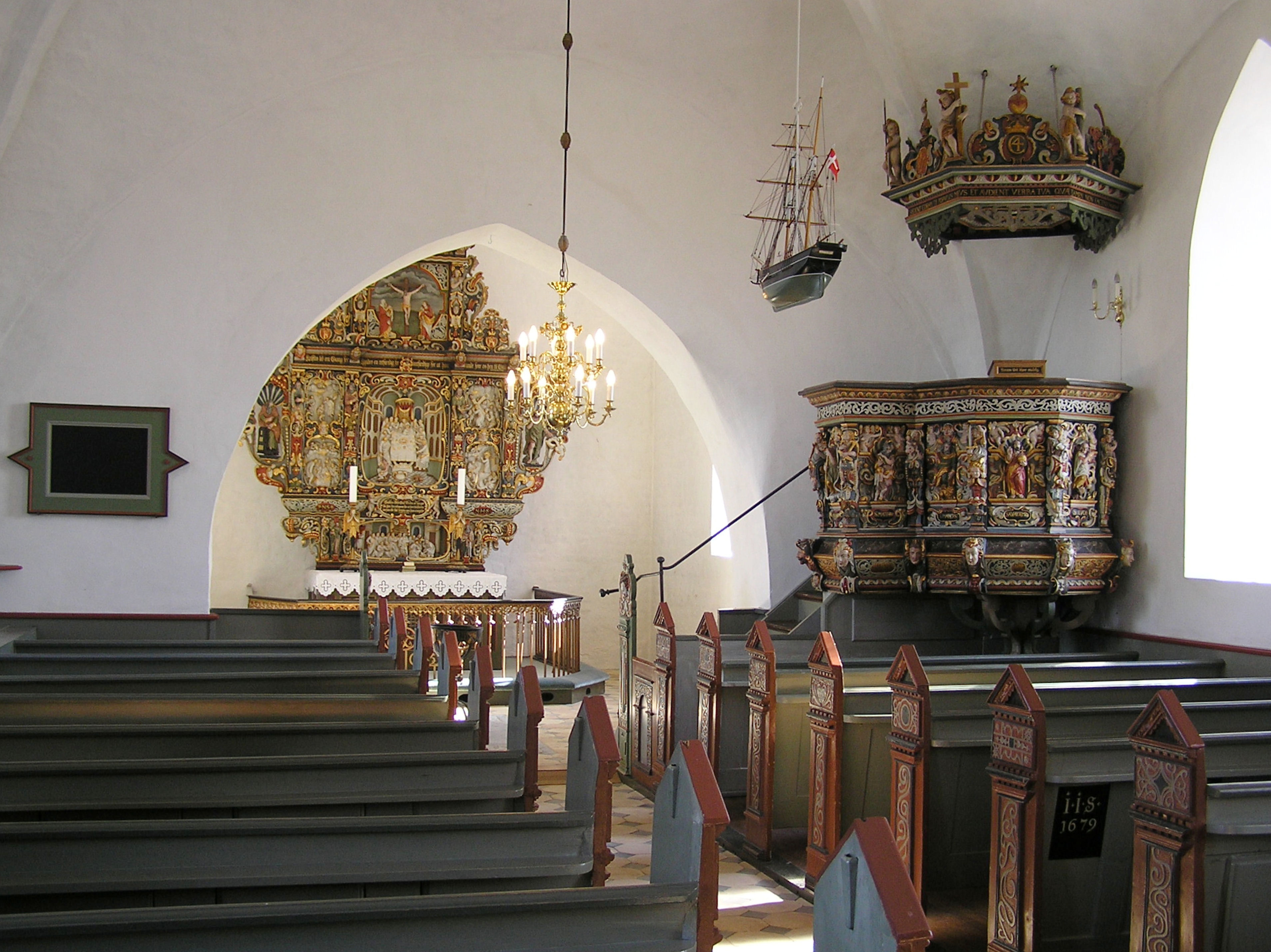

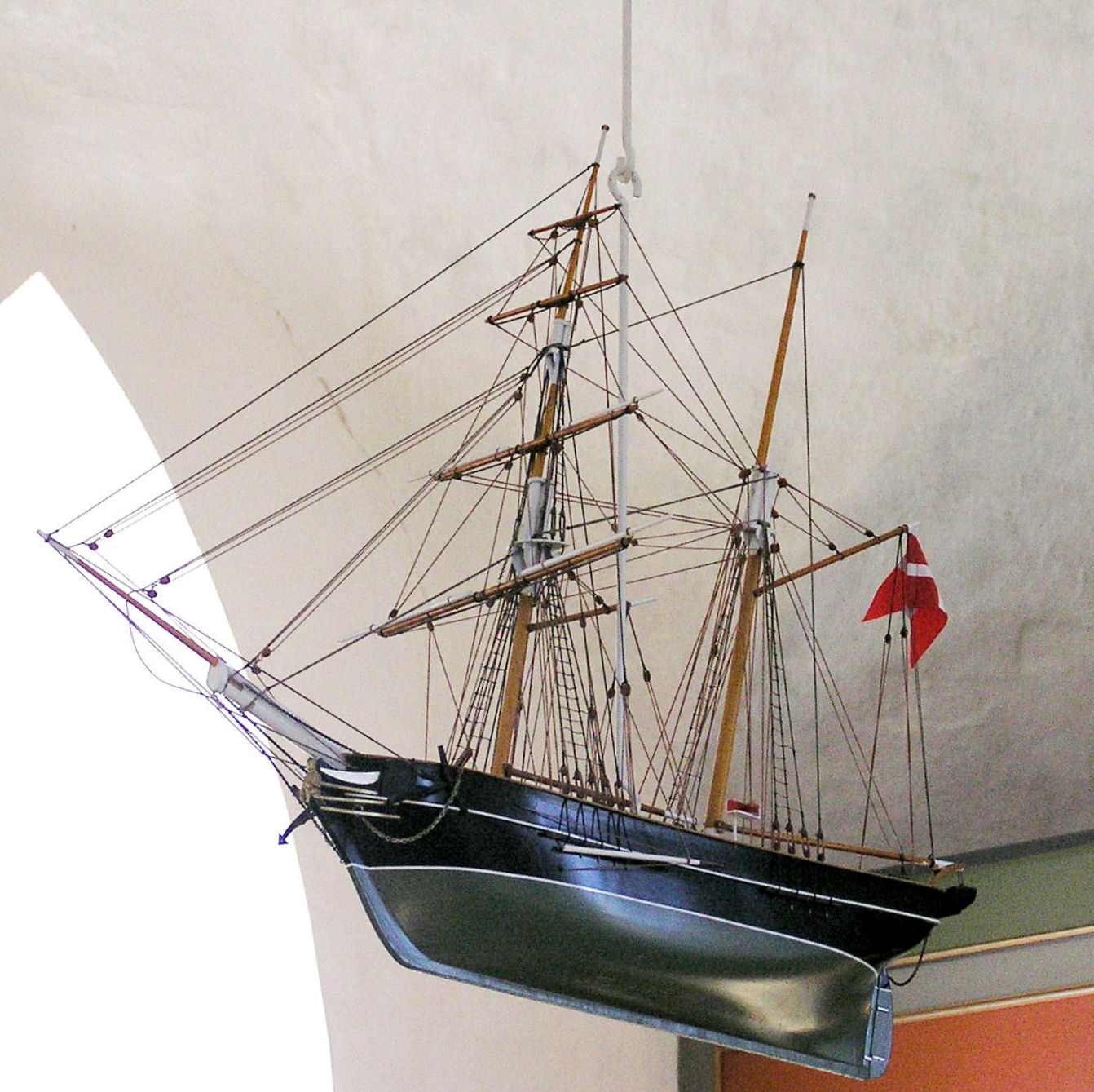
