= Diocese of Helsingør =

Diocese of the Church of Denmark

Coordinates: 56.0357°N 12.6142°E

Diocese of Helsingør HelsingørStift
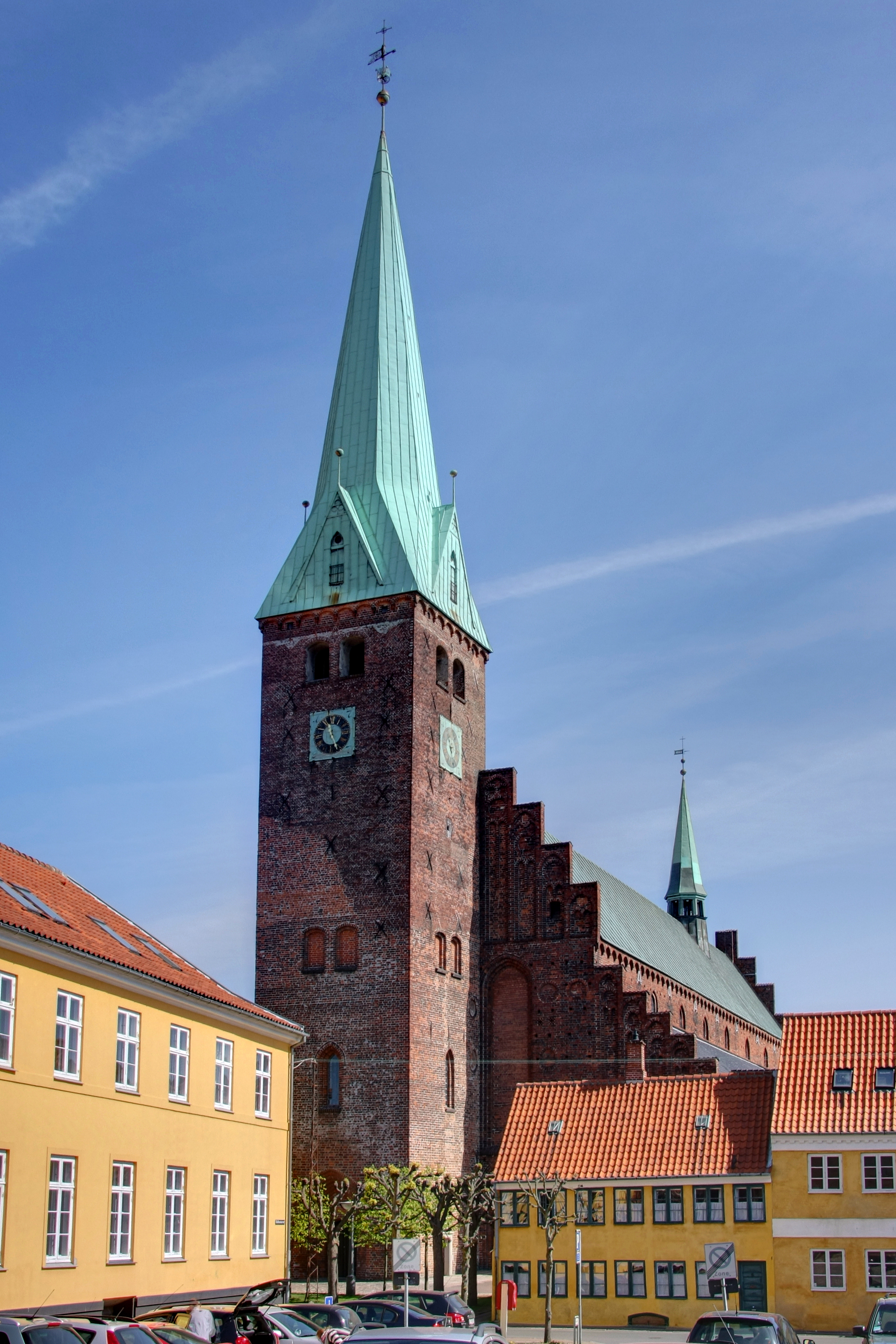
- The Cathedral of the diocese.

Location
- Country: Denmark

Statistics
- Population: Total: (as of 2016); 1,002,815
- Members: 692,405 (69.1%)

Information
- Denomination: Church of Denmark
- Sui iuris church: Latin Church
- Cathedral: Saint Olaf Cathedral in Helsingør

Current leadership
- Bishop: Peter Birch

The Diocese of Helsingør (Danish: Helsingør Stift) is a diocese within the Evangelical Lutheran Church of Denmark. It comprises the Danish Capital Region except for the core municipalities of Copenhagen, Frederiksberg, Tårnby and Dragør. Disjoined from the Diocese of Copenhagen on 1 January 1961, it is the most recently established of the 10 dioceses within the Danish state church. The main church is Saint Olaf's Church in Helsingør.

The current bishop is Peter Birch who succeeded Lise-Lotte Rebel on 1 April 2021.

== List of Bishops ==
- J.B. Leer-Andersen, 1961–1980
- Johannes Johansen, 1980–1995
- Lise-Lotte Rebel, 1995–2021
- Peter Birch, 2021–present
