= Nakskov Church =

Church in Nakskov, Denmark

Coordinates: 54°49′51″N 11°08′05″E

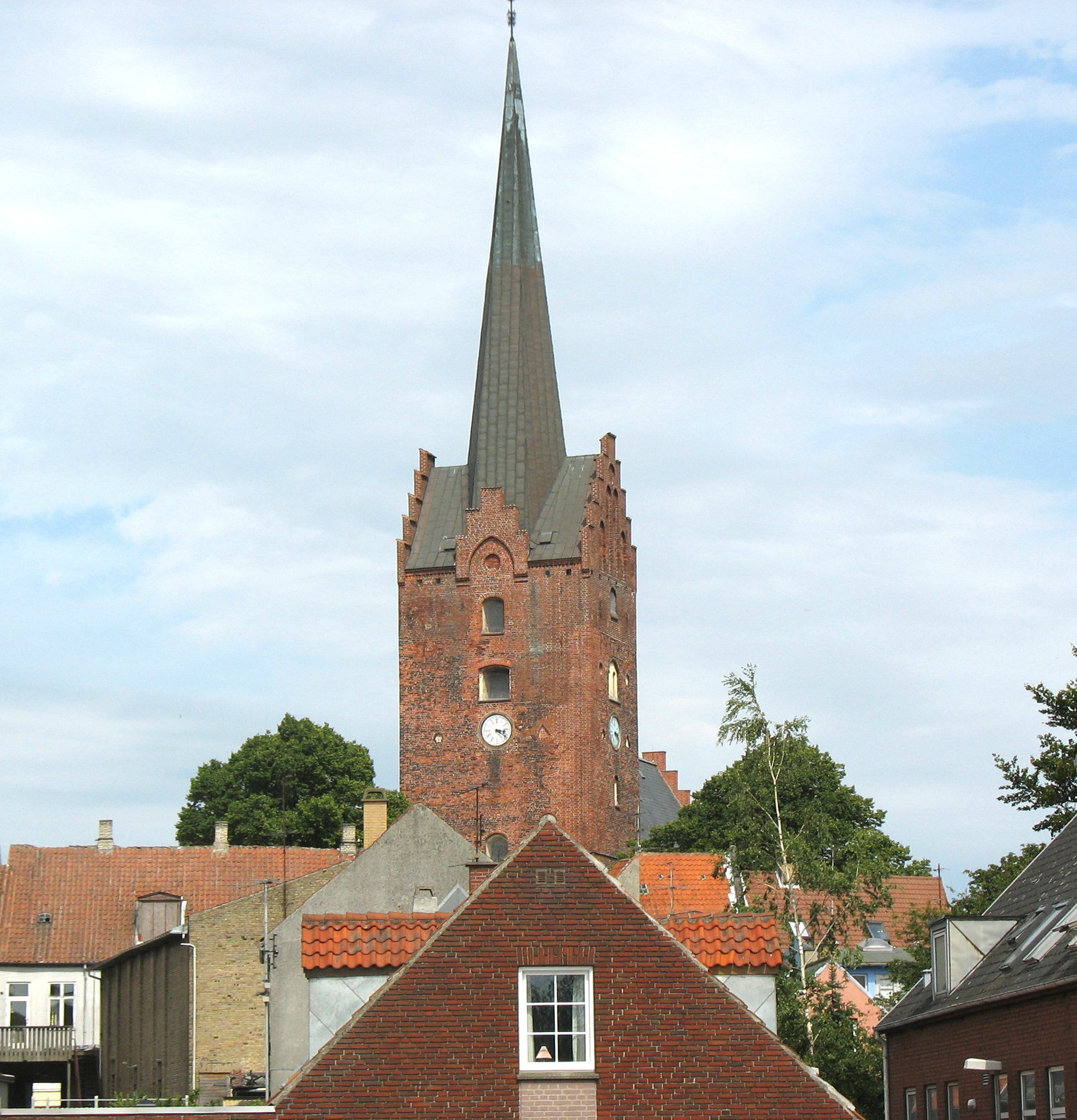
Nakskov Church

Nakskov Church (Danish: Sankt Nikolai Kirke) is the largest church in Nakskov on the west coast of the Danish island of Lolland. As Nakskov was mentioned in Valdemar's Census Book in the 13th century, the church probably dates to the same period.

== History ==
Remains of a wooden church from c. 1000 were unearthed in the 1950s. It was replaced by a brick church dedicated to Saint Nicholas which is first mentioned in 1398 although its oldest sections probably date from the early 13th century. It was completed in the second half of the 17th century. Major repairs were carried out in 1746 but further work proved necessary in 1825. Before the Danish Reformation, the church had a series of chapels and altars, each connected with the craftsmen's guilds in the town. Much of the documentation was destroyed when the Lübeckers plundered Nakskov in 1510.

== Architecture ==
Built of light red brick, the original chancel and nave were in the Romanesque style. Parts of these remain in the Gothic additions from the first half of the 15th century. Major extensions were added to both east and west, resulting in aisles on either side of the nave which virtually encapsulated the older construction. A large tower was also built at the west end of the former nave at the beginning of the 15th century. In the mid-17th century, after a period of some 200 years without further construction work, Gothic additions were completed. The Romanesque chancel was demolished while rectangular arches were added in the former walls. The spire which was repeatedly damaged by lightning was finally redesigned by H.C. Glahn in 1906.

== Interior ==
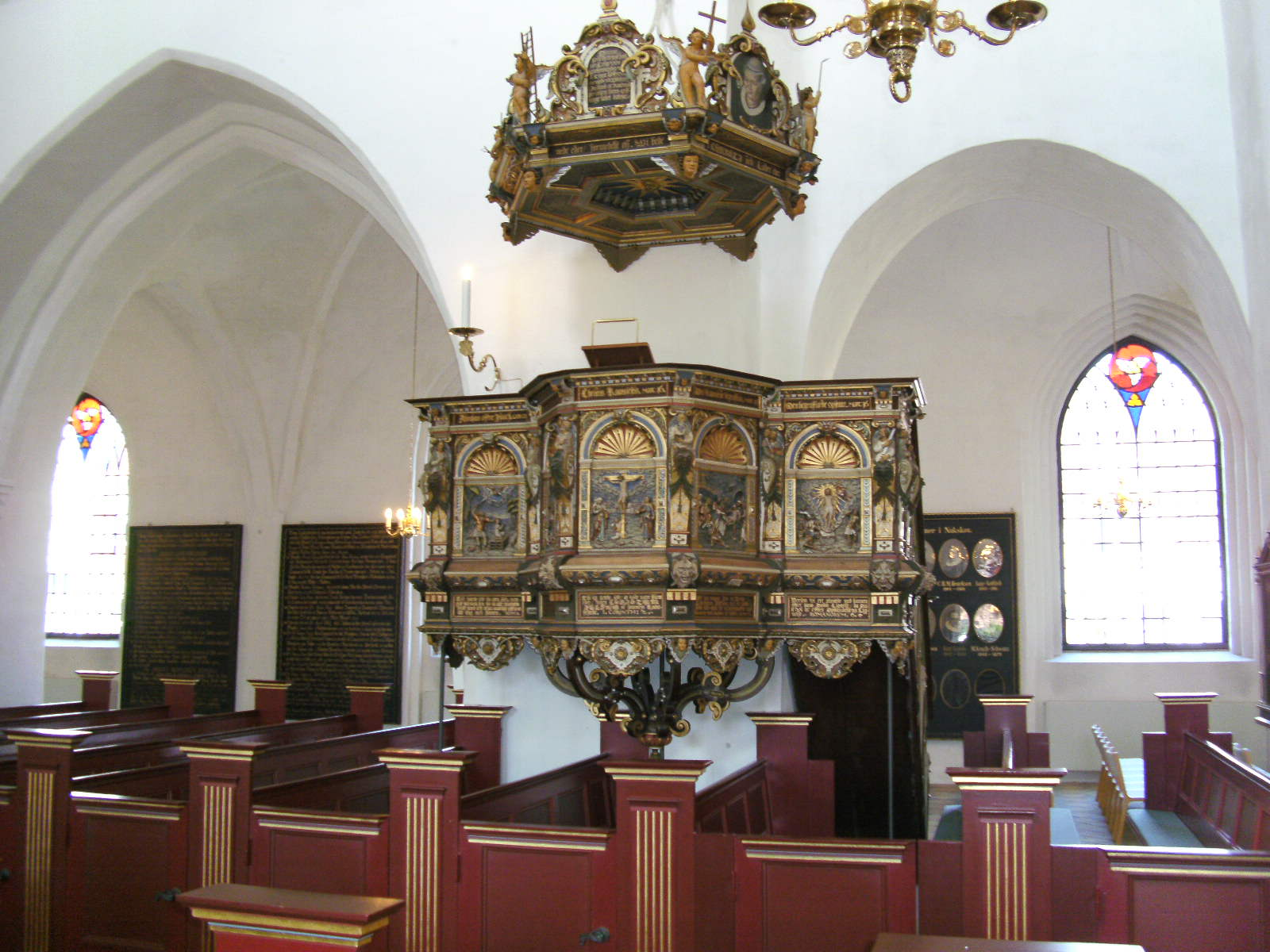
Pulpit by Jørgen Ringnis (1630)

The carved altarpiece in the auricular style from 1656 is the work of Anders Mortensen from Odense. The central painting of the Last Supper (which contains an image of Nakskov Church in the background) is topped by depictions of the Crucifixion and Christ's removal from the cross. There are also figures of the Evangelists and the Apostles, Christ Resurrected and also of Moses and Aaron. The pulpit, also in the Baroque auricular style, was completed by Jørgen Ringnis in 1630. It was presented to the church by Mayor Thyge Sørensen whose portrait, and that of his wife, have been included in the pulpit's decorations which also include the 12 apostles. Ringnis also designed the gallery (1631) with figures of the apostles which now stands below the organ loft. The organ was built by Johan Lorentz in 1648 and restored in 1968. On that occasion, Paul-Gerhard Andersen took pains to restore the organ's Baroque housing by Søren Ibsen.

== See also ==
- List of churches on Lolland
