= Abel Schrøder =

Danish woodcarver

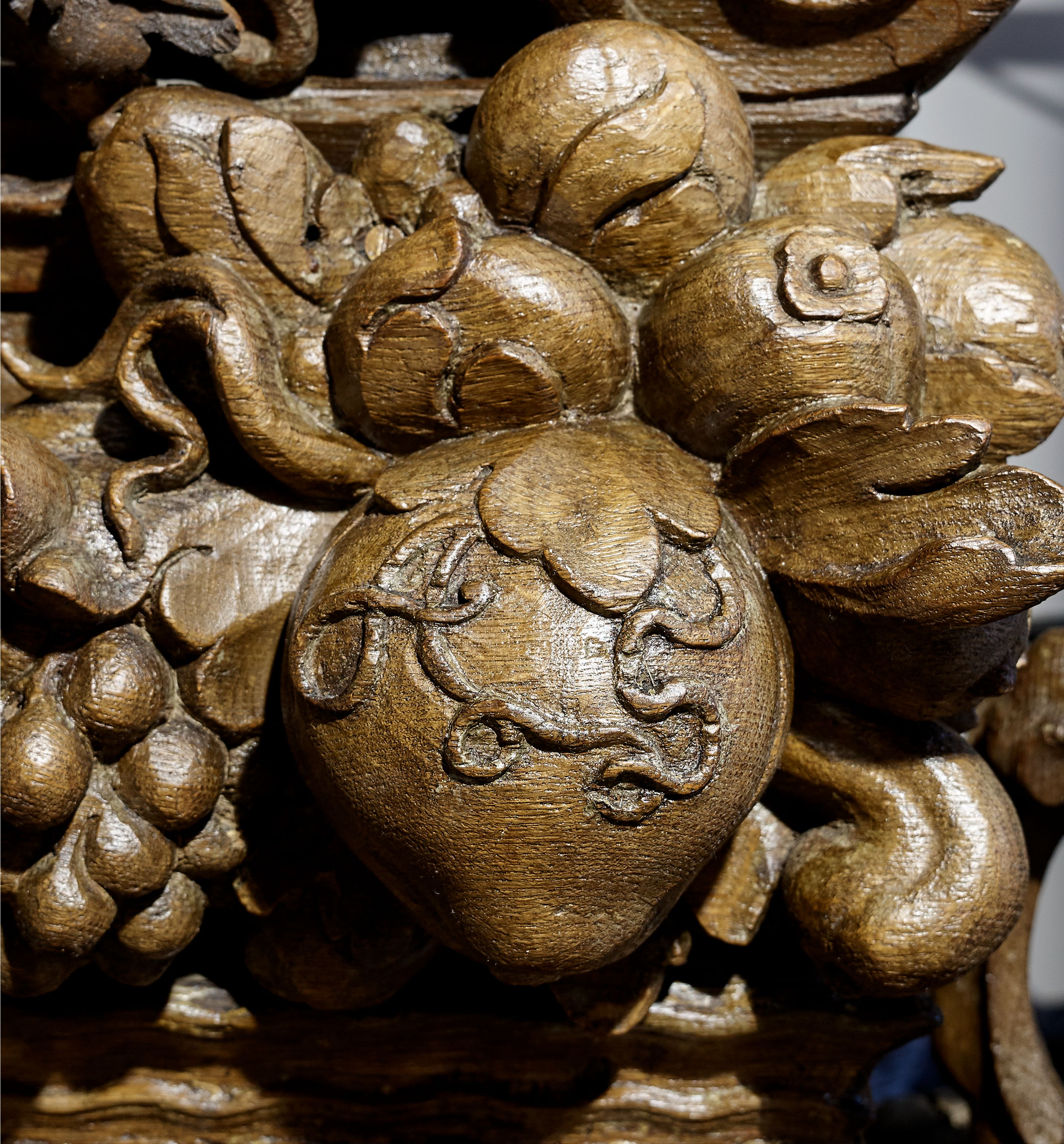
Signature of Abel Schrøder on the altar of Jolmen Church in Copenhagen.

Abel Schrøder, also Abel Schrøder the Younger, (c. 1602–1676) was a Danish woodcarver with a workshop in Næstved, then the centre for woodcarving in Southern Zealand. He is remembered for his many auricular altarpieces and pulpits depicting scenes from the life of Christ. Schrøder was also the organist for 42 years in St Martin's Church, Næstved.

== Biography ==
Under the sponsorship of Frederik Reedz, a lensmand or royal vassal, most of Schrøder's work was for churches in the region of Vordingborg. He created the pulpit in Undløse Church, the parish church for Reedz' manor Tygestrup, now known as Kongsdal, and probably also that in the neighbouring church of Søndersted. A stone epitaph in St Peter's Church, Næstved, provides a brief account of Schrøder's life: "Sculptor and organist in St Martin's Church for 42 years, husband of his dear wife Mette Petersdatter for 47 years with whom he was the father of nine children..." The inscription also tells us Schrøder died on 5 March 1676 and that six of his children were buried with him. Schrøder is first mentioned in the Næstved land register for 1628. Eleven works dated between 1632 and 1676 are known to be his, eight of which are initialed. The pulpit in Nestelsø Church is clearly considered to be Schrøder's as his decorative sign and the initials AAS, interpreted as Abel Abelsen Schrøder, are inscribed with the date 1632 on a limestone ashlar on the church's outer wall. Among the other works he almost certainly created is the altarpiece in Sandby Church (1642), although other craftsmen also contributed to it. The pulpit in Aversi Church near Ringsted is also ascribed to his workshop. The corners are decorated with figures representing the Virtues while the panels depict Christ and the four Evangelists.

== Style ==
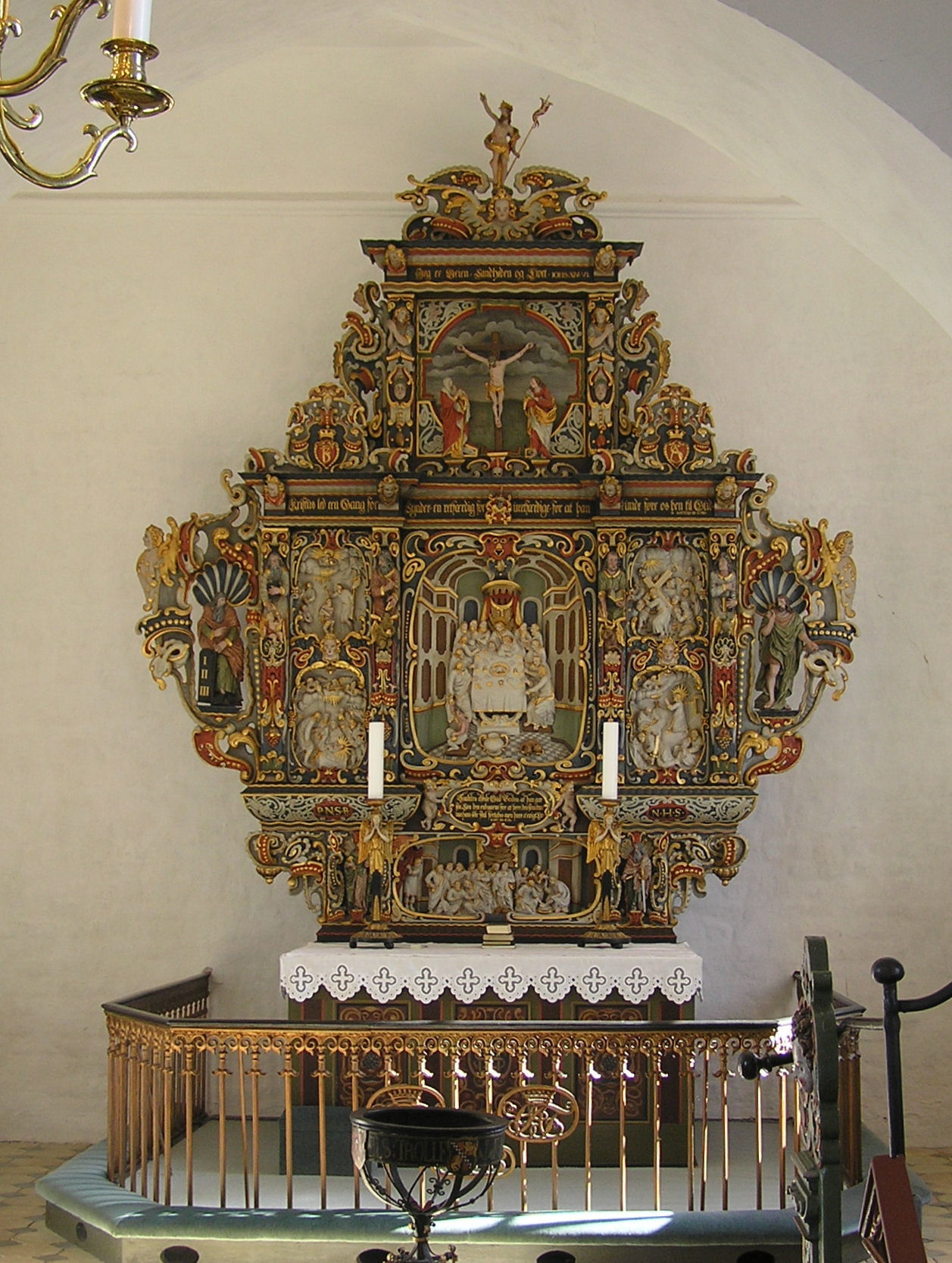
Altarpiece (1655), Vester Egesborg Church, Næstved

The main theme of his altarpieces and pulpits is Christ's life on earth and in heaven as summarized in the Creed. Many of his altarpieces are centred on the Passion. The figures often appear to be conversing with each other in a setting framed by reliefs and decorations in the Auricular style. The works also frequently contain personifications of the Virtues or representations of the prophets, apostles and other Biblical figures. The workshop often worked with models from the Netherlands in composing reliefs as can be seen in the pulpit in Holmen Church, clearly inspired by illustrations from the Piscator Bible published by the Visscher family in Antwerp. Earlier, less well proportioned works were inspired by ornaments from the Neuws Compertament Buchlein published by Godfridt Müller in 1621.

== Assessment ==
Some 60 works, large and small, have been attributed to Schrøder by the relevant literature. If this assessment is correct, his workshop was one of the most productive of the period. His works were however not as well proportioned as those of Lorentz Jørgensen of Holbæk, nor were his Auricular decorations as coherent and consistent as those of the anonymous master known as AS. But Schrøder's work excels in the narrative displayed by his vast array of Biblical scenes as well as in his imaginative decorations.

== Selected works ==
- Altarpieces: Vordingborg Church, Tyvelse Church, Præstø Church (1656), Tybjerg Church (1658), Holmen Church, Copenhagen (1661), St Martin's Church, Næstved (1667), Tjøme Church in Norway (1670–76, signed).
- Pulpits: Nestelsø Church (1632), Undløse Church (1643), Nordrupøster Church (1664)
- Altarpieces attributed to Schrøder: Everdrup Church (ca. 1633); Gunderslev Church, Sandby Church (c. 1642), Hammer Church (1642), Glumsø Church (c. 1645), Vrangstrup Church (c. 1650), Vester Egesborg Church (ca. 1655) and Vejlø Church (1669). In Norway: Nes kirke, Borre kirke (c. 1664) and Vivestad Church (1667).
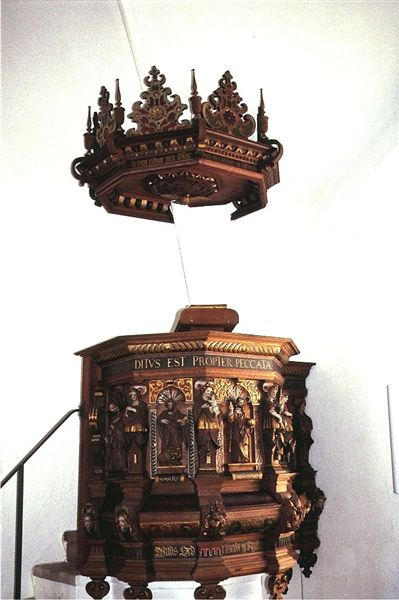
Pulpit, Aversi Church (c. 1630)

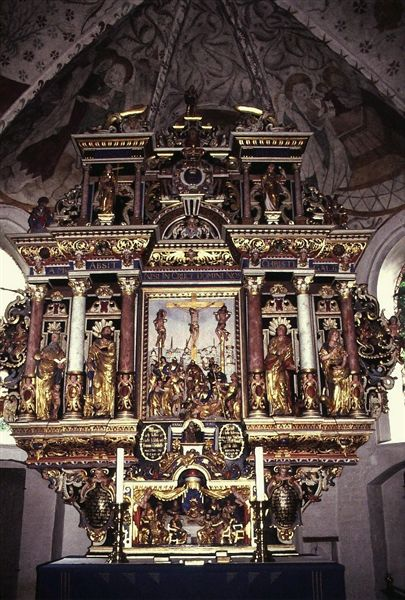
Altarpiece, Vordingborg Church (1640)

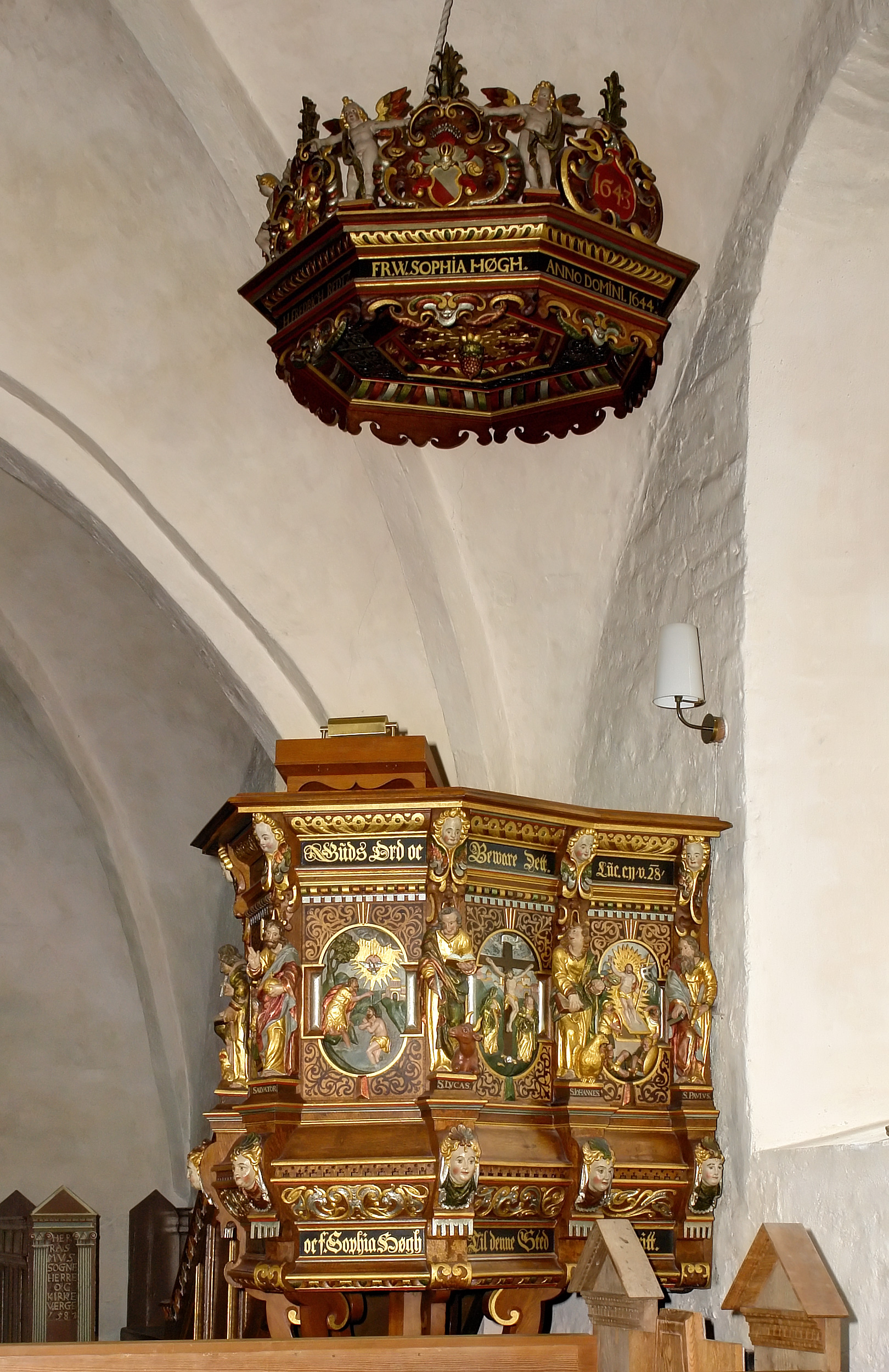
Pulpit, Undløse Church (1643)

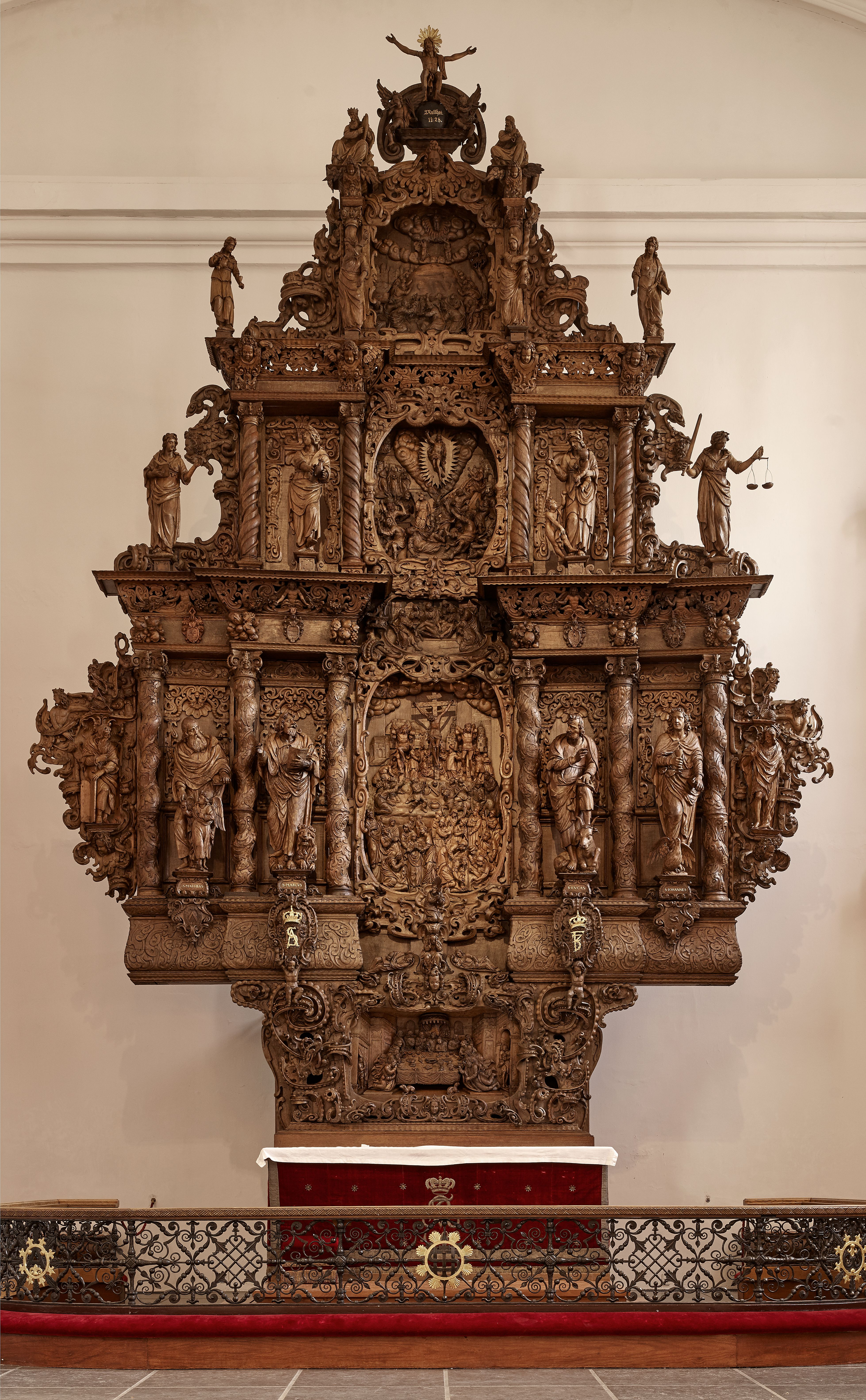
Altarpiece, Holmen Church (1661)

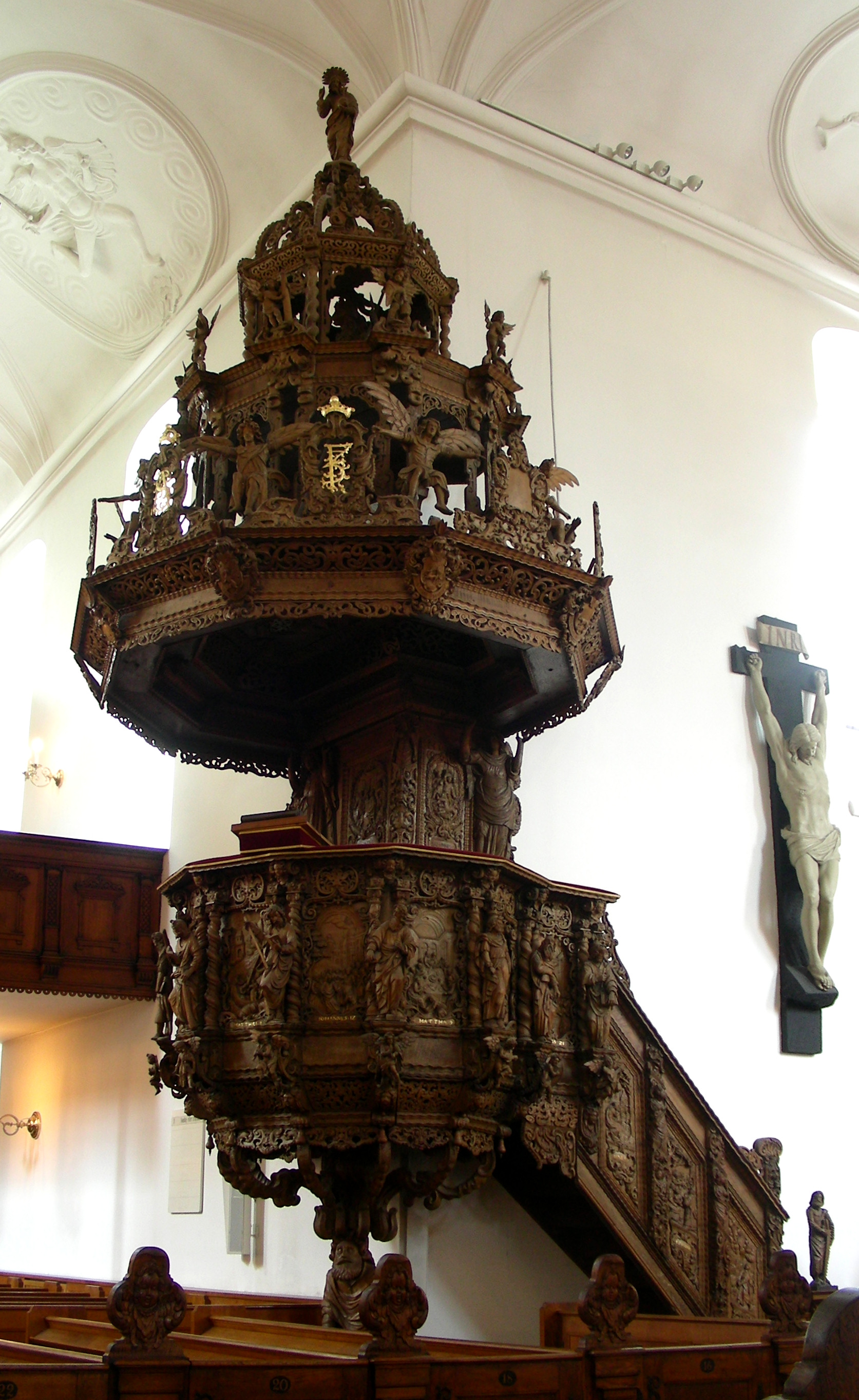
Pulpit, Holmen Church (1662)
