= Lorentz Jørgensen =

Danish woodcarver

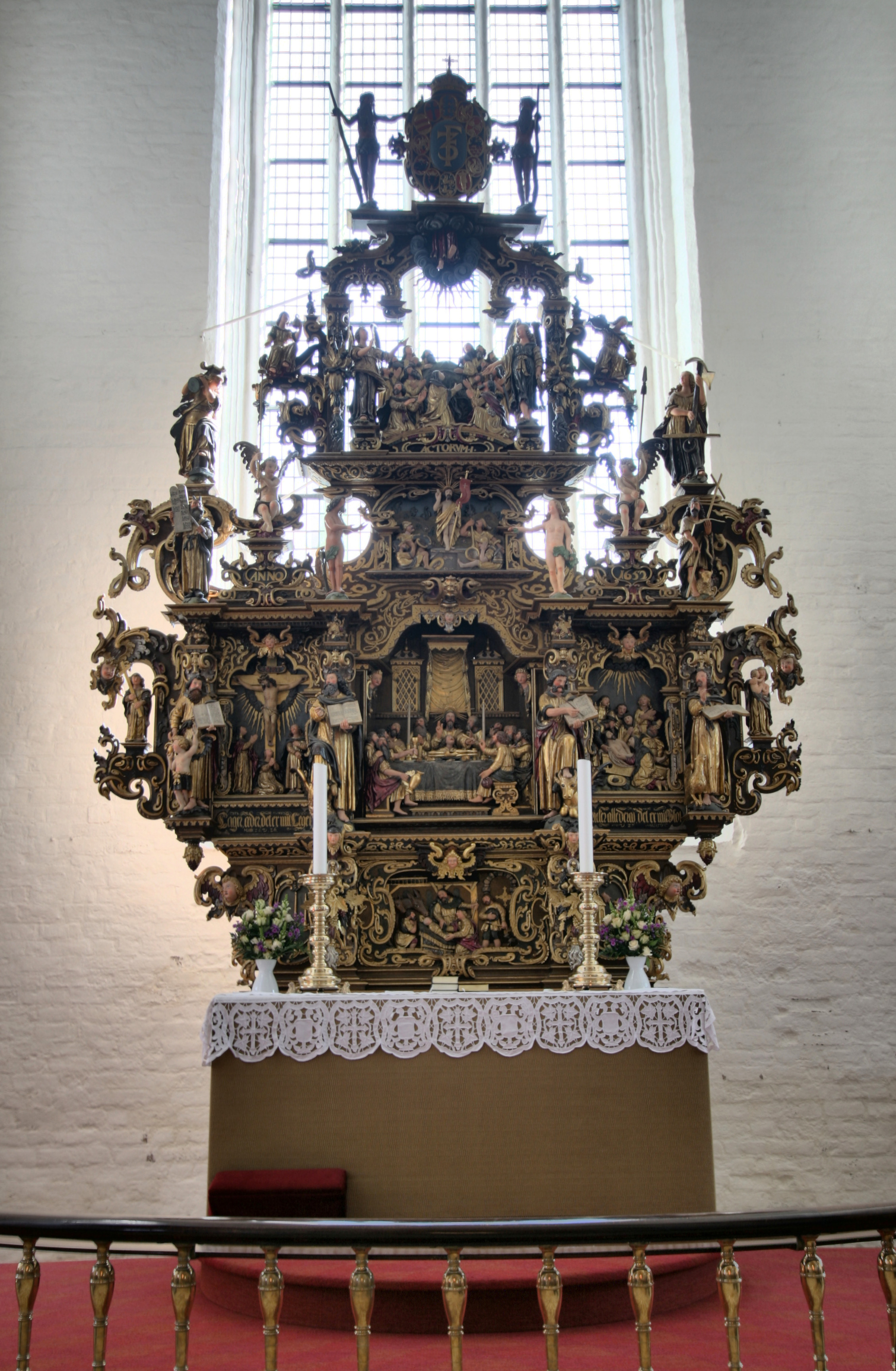
Altarpiece, Sankt Nicolai Kirke, Køge

Lorentz Jørgensen (before 1644 – after 1681) was a Danish woodcarver. He was possibly trained by Hans Gudewerdt in Eckernförde. The two may well have worked together in 1643 on the altar screen for the north chapel in Halsted Priory Church on Lolland. His career then became intricately related to that of Christoffer Knudsen Urne (1594–1663) who was appointed lensman (vassal) at Tranekær on Langeland in 1642. It was there Jørgensen completed his first documented work in the local church.

In 1645, Jørgensen moved with Urne to Zealand where he settled in Holbæk which became the centre of his activity. The pulpit in Holmstrup Church was the first of many works he created for churches in the area. From there, he went on to design works for Køge, Kalundborg and Helsingør.

The altarpiece in Egebjerg Church (1648) is interesting in that it depicts the Crucifixion in the centrepiece, rather than the Last Supper as was usual, and also contains figures of Christoffer Urne and his wife Sophie Lindenow.

Jørgensen is one of those woodcarvers who had a well defined, easily recognizable style. There is therefore little doubt about the origin of his works, even those which were left unsigned. His subjects are repeatedly displayed in a gallery of statuesque figures. His talents are above all evident in the ornamental rococo framework around the panels of his many altarpieces.

== Works ==
Signed

- Baptismal font, Tranekær Church (1644)
- Altarpiece for Tranekær Church (1644, now in Stoense Church)
- Pulpit in Holmstrup Church (1647)
- Altarpiece in St Nicholas Church, Køge (1652)
- Figures for the altarpiece in Sorø Abbey Church (1656)
- Altarpieces in Asminderød Church (1658, burnt 1942); in Saint Olaf's Church, Helsingør (1662) and in Gerlev Church (1667)
- Pulpits in Sønder Jernløse Church (1676) and in Nørre Jernløse Church (1679)
- Crucifix in Butterup Church (1670)

Attributed

- Altar screen, Halsted Priory Church (1643)
- Altarpiece and pulpit, Egebjerg Church (1648)
- Altarpieces: Vig Church (1650), Church of Our Lady, Kalundborg (1650); Bregninge Church (1654); Hjembæk Church (1655); Raklev Church (1668); Skibinge Church (1669); Tveje Merløse Church (ca. 1670); Ubby Church (1677)
- Pulpits in Fuglsbølle Church (1644); Hjembæk Church (1651); Højby Church (1656); Store Tåstrup Church (1657); Butterup Church (1660); St. Peders Church, Næstved (1671); Brønshøj Church (1678)
- Epitaph frames: Holbæk Church, St Nicholas Church, Køge and Holmens Church, Copenhagen
- Crucifix, Hjembæk Church
