= Listed buildings in Helsingør Municipality =

This is a list of listed buildings in Helsingør Municipality, Denmark.

== The list ==
=== 3060 Espergærde ===
| Listing name | Image | Location | Coordinates | Description | Ref |
|---|---|---|---|---|---|
| Gammel Strandvej 410: Tibberup Windmill | | Gammel Strandvej 410, 3060 Espergærde | 55°59′5.95″N 12°33′7.31″E | Smock mill from 1870 | |

=== 3999 Helsingør ===
| Listing name | Image | Location | Coordinates | Description | Ref |
|---|---|---|---|---|---|
| Anna Queens Stræde 2 | | Anna Queens Stræde 2, 3000 Helsingør | 56°1′56.66″N 12°36′35.13″E | Wing from c. 1700. | |
| Bjergegade 11 | | Bjergegade 11A, 3000 Helsingør | 56°2′7.3″N 12°36′41.79″E | Buildings from c. 1800. | |
| Bjergegade 30: Den Eckhardtske Stiftelse | | Bjergegade 30A, 3000 Helsingør | 56°2′13.5″N 12°36′37.03″E | House fronting the street probably dating from c. 1700 but rebuilt in 1781. | |
| Bjergegade 30: Den Eckhardtske Stiftelse | | Bjergegade 30C, 3000 Helsingør | 56°2′13.75″N 12°36′38.03″E | Half-timbered building in the courtyard. | |
| Bjergegade 32 | | Bjergegade 32A, 3000 Helsingør | 56°2′14.04″N 12°36′36.44″E | | |
| Bragesvej 1: Gurrevejsstiftelsen | | Bragesvej 1, 3000 Helsingør | 56°2′10.65″N 12°35′44.6″E | Three residential blocks from 1919-21 designed by Poul Holsøe. | |
| Bramstræde 4: Troels Lund House | | Bramstræde 4A, 3000 Helsingør | 56°2′3.64″N 12°36′46.4″E | House with two side wings from originally from 1500 but completely rebuilt in 1810–30. | |
| Gammel Hellebækvej 70: Lo-skolen (7) | | Gl Hellebækvej 70A, 3000 Helsingør | 1969 | Conference centre built in 1969 and expanded in 1974-1987 by Karen and Ebbe Clemmensen in collaboration with Jarl Heger and landscape architect Agnete Muusfeldt. | |
| Hestemøllestræde 2 A-B | | Hestemøllestræde 2B, 3000 Helsingør | 56°2′10.72″N 12°36′47.02″E | House dating from 1736 with extra floor from before 1761. | |
| Hestemøllestræde 2 A-B | | Hestemøllestræde 2C. 3000 Helsingør | 18th century | House dating from 1736 with extra floor from before 1761. | |
| Jernbanevej 7: Helsingør Post Office | | Jernbanevej 7, 3000 Helsingør | 56°1′59.16″N 12°36′47.18″E | Post office from 1890-91 designed by N. P. Holsøe | |
| Jernbanevej 11A: Ilgodspakhuset | | Jernbanevej 11A, 3000 Helsingør | 56°1′53.16″N 12°36′38.17″E | Warehouse from 1890-91 by N. P. Holsøe | |
| Kronborg | | Kronborg 1A, 3000 Helsingør | | Brohus: Guardhouse | |
| Kronborg | | Kronborg 1B, 3000 Helsingør | | Castle: | |
| Kronborg | | Kronborg 1B, 3000 Helsingør | | Guardhouse: | |
| Kronborg | | Kronborg 1B, 3000 Helsingør | | Guardhouse: | |
| Kronborg | | Kronborg 1C, 3000 Helsingør | | Guardhouse: | |
| Kronborg | | Kronborg 2A, 3000 Helsingør | | Residential building: | |
| Kronborg | | Kronborg 3A, 3000 Helsingør | | Residential building: | |
| Kronborg | | Kronborg 13, 3000 Helsingør | | Infirmeribygning: | |
| Kronborg | | Kronborg 17A, 3000 Helsingør | | Eksercerhus: | |
| Kronborg | | Kronborg 32, 3000 Helsingør | | Gunpowder magazine: | |
| Kronborg | | Kronborg 34, 3000 Helsingør | | Workshop: | |
| Kronborg | | Kronborg 40, 3000 Helsingør | | Residential building, formerly two buildings (guardhouse and laboratory building) | |
| Kongensgade 12: Helsingør Latin School | | Kongensgade 12B, 3000 Helsingør | 56°2′15.16″N 12°36′38.02″E | | |
| Lappen 1 | | Lappen 1, 3000 Helsingør | c. 1800 | House from c. 1800 | |
| Lappen 6 | | Lappen 6, 3000 Helsingør | 19th century | House from the 19th century | |
| Lappen 8 | | Lappen 8, 3000 Helsingør | 1861 | House from 1851 with an extra floor added in 1869 | |
| Lappen 10 A-B | | Lappen 10A, 3000 Helsingør | c. 1850 | House from c. 1850 | |
| Lappen 10 A-B | | Lappen 10A, 3000 Helsingør | 1775 | House from 1775 | |
| Lappen 12 | | Lappen 12, 3000 Helsingør | | House from before 1736 | |
| Lappen 14 | | Lappen 14, 3000 Helsingør | | House from dating from 1843 and expanded with extra floor in the 1870s | |
| Lappen 16 | | Lappen 17, 3000 Helsingør | | House from dating from 1848 and expanded with extra floor in the 1870s | |
| Lappen 18 | | Lappen 18, 3000 Helsingør | 1798 | House from 1798 | |
| Lappen 18 | | Lappen 18, 3000 Helsingør | 1801/1811 | Wing from 1801 and 1811 | |
| Lappen 22 | | Lappen 22, 3000 Helsingør | 1871 | House from dating from 1871 | |
| Lappen 24 | | Lappen 24, 3000 Helsingør | | House from c. 1770 with extra floor added in the 1820s facing the street and in c. 1867 to the rear | |
| Lappen 26 | | Lappen 26, 3000 Helsingør | | House from c. 1770, with facade changed in the 1920s and extra floor added in c. 1880 | |
| Lappen 28 | | Lappen 28, 3000 Helsingør | | House from 1736 with extra floor added in c. 1841 and 1855 | |
| Lappen 30 | | Lappen 30, 3000 Helsingør | | House from before 1736 with facade changed after 1873 | |
| Lappen 32 | | Lappen 32, 3000 Helsingør | 1871 | House from 1871 | |
| Lappen 36 | | Lappen 36, 3000 Helsingør | | House from before 1736 with facade changed in c. 1827 | |
| Lappen 38 | | Lappen 38, 3000 Helsingør | 1841/1903 | Nine-bay house from 1841 and 1903 | |
| Marienlyst Allé 7 | | Marienlyst Alle 7, 3000 Helsingør | 56°2′18.89″N 12°36′20.7″E | House from 1907 designed by Povl Baumann | |
| Marienlyst Allé 32: Marienlyst Castle | | Marienlyst Alle 32, 3000 Helsingør | 56°2′30.9″N 12°36′7.45″E | House from 1762 designed by Nicolas-Henri Jardin and the surrounding garden which was originally established in 1608 but redesigned in 1932 | |
| Marienlyst Allé 32: Marienlyst Castle | | Marienlyst Alle 32, 3000 Helsingør | 56°2′30.9″N 12°36′7.45″E | Gatehouse from 1755 | |
| Murergade 7: Plejehjemmet Hammershøj | | Murergade 7, 3000 Helsingør | 56°2′0.99″N 12°36′18.88″E | Senior citizens home from 1966 designed by Birger Schmidt according to sketch project by Jørn Utzon | |
| Sct Anna Gade 6A: Buxtehude House | | Sct Anna Gade 6A, 3000 Helsingør | 56°2′7.27″N 12°36′48.91″E | House dating from c. 1500 but rebuilt in the 19th century | |
| Sankt Annagade 8 | | Sct Anna Gade 8, 3000 Helsingør | 56°2′7.61″N 12°36′48.61″E | House | |
| Sankt Annagade 11 | | Sct Anna Gade 11, 3000 Helsingør | 56°2′8.99″N 12°36′46.56″E | House from 1620 | |
| Sankt Annagade 27 | | Sct Anna Gade 27A, 3000 Helsingør | 56°2′11.84″N 12°36′43.87″E | House from 1826 | |
| Sct Anna Gade 36: Helsingør City Museum | | Sct Anna Gade 36, 3000 Helsingør | 56°2′11.81″N 12°36′44.58″E | | |
| Sankt Annagade 38 | | Sct Anna Gade 38, 3000 Helsingør | 56°2′11.81″N 12°36′44.58″E | Walls west of the monastery | |
| Sankt Annagade 40: Carmelite Priory | | Sct Anna Gade 40, 3000 Helsingør | 56°2′14.35″N 12°36′44.85″E | | |
| Sankt Annagade 40: Carmelite Priory | | Sct Anna Gade 40, 3000 Helsingør | 56°2′14.35″N 12°36′44.85″E | | |
| Sankt Annagade 41 | | Sct Anna Gade 41A, 3000 Helsingør | 56°2′14.68″N 12°36′41.2″E | House dating from 1736 with extra floor from before 1761 | |
| Sankt Annagade 41 | | Sct Anna Gade 41A, 3000 Helsingør | 56°2′14.68″N 12°36′41.2″E | Sinde wing from the 1780s | |
| Sankt Annagade 41 | | Sct Anna Gade 41B, 3000 Helsingør | 56°2′14.61″N 12°36′41.03″E | Two-storey rear wing from 1763 | |
| Sankt Olaigade 9 | | Sct Olai Gade 9A, 3000 Helsingør | 56°2′3.92″N 12°36′33.73″E | House dating from the 18th century | |
| Sankt Olaigade 9 | | Sct Olai Gade 9C, 3000 Helsingør | 56°2′4.02″N 12°36′33.99″E | Rear wing dating from the 18th century | |
| Sankt Olaigade 12-14 | | Sct Olai Gade 12, 3000 Helsingør | 56°2′4.25″N 12°36′35.66″E | House dating from between 1782 and 1791 | |
| Sankt Olaigade 12-14 | | Sct Olai Gade 14, 3000 Helsingør | 56°2′4.51″N 12°36′36.28″E | House from 1806 | |
| Sankt Olaigade 49 | | Kirkestræde 1A, 3000 Helsingør | 56°2′9.86″N 12°36′47.8″E | Building with exposed timber framing from 1784 | |
| Sankt Olaigade 49 | | Sct Olai Gade 49, 3000 Helsingør | 56°2′9.76″N 12°36′48.41″E | House from 1784 | |
| Sankt Olaigade 51-53 | | Sct Olai Gade 51, 3000 Helsingør | 56°2′10.09″N 12°36′49.17″E | | |
| Sankt Olaigade 51-53 | | Sct Olai Gade 53, 3000 Helsingør | 56°2′10.31″N 12°36′49.73″E | | |
| Sankt Olaigade 55 | | Sct Olai Gade 55, 3000 Helsingør | 56°2′10.73″N 12°36′50.84″E | Corner house from the 19th century | |
| Sophie Brahesgade 2 | | Sophie Brahes Gade 2A, 3000 Helsingør | 56°2′8.5″N 12°36′54.91″E | | |
| Sophie Brahesgade 2 | | Sophie Brahes Gade 2B, 3000 Helsingør | 56°2′8.71″N 12°36′54.67″E | Rear wing | |
| Sophie Brahes Gade 3: Dodt House | | Sophie Brahes Gade 3A, 3000 Helsingør | 56°2′7.39″N 12°36′55.48″E | Complex dating from 1783 | |
| Sophie Brahes Gade 5: De Meza House | | Sophie Brahes Gade 5A, 3000 Helsingør | 56°2′8.31″N 12°36′54.38″E | House with two side wings gfrom the 18th century | |
| Sophie Brahes Gade 5: De Meza House | | Sophie Brahes Gade 5B, 3000 Helsingør | 56°2′8.6″N 12°36′54.08″E | Rear wing | |
| Sophie Brahesgade 6 | | Sophie Brahes Gade 6, 3000 Helsingør | 56°2′9.75″N 12°36′53.41″E | | |
| Stationspladsen 1: Helsingør Station | | Stationspladsen 1A, 3000 Helsingør | 1891 | Station building and platform roofs with cast iron pillars from 1890-91 designed by N.P. Holsøe and Heinrich Wenck | |
| Stengade 20: Iver Pedersen House | | Skyttenstræde 12, 3000 Helsingør | c. 1600 | House from c. 1600 | |
| Stengade 20: Iver Pedersen House | | Stengade 20A, 3000 Helsingør | c. 1600 | House from c. 1600 | |
| Stengade 22: Milan House | | Stengade 22B, 3000 Helsingør | 1695 | House from 1595 | |
| Stengade 25 | | Stengade 25, 3000 Helsingør | | | |
| Stengade 29: Knud Andersen House | | Stengade 29A, 3000 Helsingør | 1645 | House fronting the street and its two-storey side wing to the rear | |
| Stengade 29: Knud Andersen House | | Stengade 29A, 3000 Helsingør | | Half-timbered shed | |
| Stengade 31: Skrivergården | | Stengade 31A, 3000 Helsingør | 1764 | Complex from the 18th century | |
| Stengade 31: Skrivergården | | Stengade 31D, 3000 Helsingør | | | |
| Stengade 31: Skrivergården | | Stengade 31G, 3000 Helsingør | | | |
| Stengade 37: Frøde House | | Stengade 37A, 3000 Helsingør | 1769 | House from 1759–60 | |
| Stengade 40: Joachim Lange House and Hans Piper House | | Stengade 40, 3000 Helsingør | 1694 | Hans Piper House: House from 1633 with facade altered in 1670 | |
| Stengade 40: Joachim Lange House and Hans Piper House | | Strandgade 49A, 3000 Helsingør | 1633/1780 | Joachim Lange House: House from 1604 | |
| Stengade 46A: Det Svenske Konsulat | | Stengade 46A, 3000 Helsingør | c. 1784 | House from c. 1784 possibly designed by n | |
| Stengade 56 | | Stengade 56A, 3000 Helsingør | | House fronting the street from c. 1600 but altered in 1777 as well as the Side wing from c. 1550 but expanded in c. 1600 and altered in 1845 and the cobbled courtyard | |
| Stengade 56 | | Stengade 56A, 3000 Helsingør | | Rear wing from c. 1830 | |
| Stengade 56 | | Stengade 56A, 3000 Helsingør | | 20 sqm storage building | |
| Stengade 58 | | Stengade 58A, 3000 Helsingør | | Building fronting the road, two more wings and the courtyard | |
| Stengade 64: Nicolai Dahl House | | Stengade 64, 3000 Helsingør | 1739 | Three-winged complex from 1739 | |
| Stengade 66: Oxernes Gård | | Stengade 66, 3000 Helsingør | | | |
| Stengade 66: Oxernes Gård | | Gl Færgestræde 5B, 3000 Helsingør | | | |
| Stengade 68 | | Stengade 68A, 3000 Helsingør | | Complex of buildings dating mostly from 1740 but partly from c. 1600 | |
| Stengade 70 | | Stengade 70A, 3000 Helsingør | c. 1500 | House from c. 1500 | |
| Stengade 72: Leyell House | | Stengade 72, 3000 Helsingør | | House from the 16th century partly altered in the 18th century | |
| Stengade 76: David Hansen House | | Stengade 76, 3000 Helsingør | 56°2′6.68″N 12°36′51.94″E | Townhouse from 1570 with cellar from the Middle Ages | |
| Stengade 78 | | Stengade 78A, 3000 Helsingør | 18th century | House from the 18th century | |
| Stengade 78 | | Stengade 78B, 3000 Helsingør | | | |
| Stengade 81: Trentwedel House | | Stengade 81, 3000 Helsingør | 1870 | House from 1770 fronting the street and side wing to the southwest from 1810-11 which was expanded with an extra floor in 1847 | |
| Stengade 82: Lütken House | | Stengade 82A, 3000 Helsingør | 18th century | House from the 18th century | |
| Osten House | | Stengade 83A, 3000 Helsingør | 1770 | House from 1770 | |
| Stjernegade 31 | | I L Tvedes Vej 1, 3000 Helsingør | c. 1800 | Corner building from c. 1800 | |
| Strandgade 1: Jens Lind House | | Strandgade 1, 3000 Helsingør | 18th century | House from the 18th century | |
| Strandgade 27: Ankeret | | Strandgade 27, 3000 Helsingør | 56°1′57.77″N 12°36′37.58″E | House from 1577 | |
| Strandgade 29 | | Strandgade 29A, 3000 Helsingør | 1761 | Building from 1761 | |
| Strandgade 29 | | Strandgade 29A, 3000 Helsingør | | Part of half-timbered side wing | |
| Strandgade 31 | | Strandgade 31A, 3000 Helsingør | 18th century | House from the 18th century | |
| Strandgade 43: Rosen | | Strandgade 43, 3000 Helsingør | | House from the 17th century and later | |
| Strandgade 45 | | Strandgade 45, 3000 Helsingør | c. 1800 | Two-storey corner building from c. 1800 | |
| Strandgade 53 | | Strandgade 53A, 3000 Helsingør | 1637 | House from 1637 fronting the street | |
| Strandgade 53 | | Strandgade 53B, 3000 Helsingør | c. 1840 | Building in the courtyard | |
| Jacob Willumsen House | | Strandgade 55A, 3000 Helsingør | 1592 | Townhouse from 1592 | |
| Jacob Willumsen House | | Strandgade 55B, 3000 Helsingør | 1592 | Rear wing from 1592 | |
| Strandgade 70 | | Strandgade 70, 3000 Helsingør | 17th century | Half-timbered house from the 17th century with extension from 1867 on the rear side | |
| Strandgade 71 | | Strandgade 71, 3000 Helsingør | | House from 1847 fronting the street and rear wing from before 1771 which was rebuilt in c. 1850 and 1973 | |
| Strandgade 72: Helsingør Custom House | | Strandgade 72, 3000 Helsingør | 1891 | Historicist former customhouse from 1891 designed by Johan Daniel Herholdt | |
| Strandgade 75 | | Strandgade 75A, 3000 Helsingør | | House dating from the 18th century | |
| Strandgade 77: Det gamle Apotek og Johan Kruses Gård | | Strandgade 77, 3000 Helsingør | 1793 | Complex dating from 1500-1642 | |
| Kirck House | | Strandgade 81A, 3000 Helsingør | | | |
| Kirck House | | Strandgade 83, 3000 Helsingør | | | |
| Strandgade 85: Fenwick House | | Strandgade 85A, 3000 Helsingør | | House originally dating from the 17th century but expanded with an extra floor in 1759-60 with two side wings to the rear of which the eastern dates from c. c. 1500 and the western from 1600 | |
| Strandgade 91A: Rasmussen House | | Strandgade 91A, 3000 Helsingør | 1790s | House from c. 1580 but expanded with extra floors in 1637 and the 1790s | |
| Strandgade 91A: Rasmussen House | | Strandgade 91C, 3000 Helsingør | | Half-timbered rear wing | |
| Strandgade 93: Classen Mansion | | Strandgade 93A, 3000 Helsingør | 1793 | Neoclassical mansion from 1891–93 designed by C.F. Harsdorff and A.C. Wilcken | |
| Strandgade 95: Stephen Hansen Mansion | | Strandgade 95, 3000 Helsingør | 1761 | Baroque-style mansion from 1761 designed by Philip de Lange | |
| Strandgade 95: Stephen Hansen Mansion | | Sophie Brahes Gade 1C, 3000 Helsingør | c. 1840 | Building in the courtyard with exposed timber framing on the upper floors from c. 1840 | |
| Svingelport 7: Spæth House | | Svingelport 7A, 3000 Helsingør | 56°1′53.51″N 12°36′31.29″E | Three-storey building from 1761–70 | |
| Svingelport 8: I. C. Tegner House | | Svingelport 8A, 3000 Helsingør | 56°1′51.62″N 12°36′29.36″E | Complex from 1791 and 1890 | |
| Valnøddevænget 10 | | Valnøddevænget 10, 3000 Helsingør | 56°1′11.2″N 12°36′30.2″E | Arts & Craft-influenced, Neoclassical country house with yard, veranda, garden and driveway from 1919 designed by Kay Fisker | |

=== 3100 Hornbæk ===
| Listing name | Image | Location | Coordinates | Description | Ref |
|---|---|---|---|---|---|
| Havnevej 19 | | Havnevej 19, 3100 Hornbæk | 18th century | House from the 18th century | |

=== 3140 Ålsgårde ===
| Listing name | Image | Location | Coordinates | Description | Ref |
|---|---|---|---|---|---|
| Nordre Strandvej 139A: Rytterhuset | | Nordre Strandvej 230A, 3140 Ålsgårde | | Former summer residence built in 1889 for the painter Frants Henningsen to a National Romantic design by Martin Nyrop | |
| Nordre Strandvej 140 | | Nordre Strandvej 140, 3140 Ålsgårde | 1810 | Half-timbered house from 1810 | |

=== 3150 Hellebæk ===
| Listing name | Image | Location | Coordinates | Description | Ref |
|---|---|---|---|---|---|
| Hellebæk Hammermølle | | Bøssemagergade 21, 3150 Hellebæk | 1765 | House and watermill from 1765 | |
| Hellebækgård | | Nordre Strandvej 129, 3150 Hellebæk | 1748 | Three-winged house from 1748 probably designed by Philip de Lange | |
| Caroline Mathildesvej 1 | | C Mathildes Vej 1A, 3150 Hellebæk | 56°4′9.5″N 12°33′22.04″E | Two wings from c. 1750 | |
| Sveasvej 21, villaer | | Sveasvej 21, 3150 Hellebæk | 1952/1959 | Two attached houses from 1952 and 1959 designed by Jørn Utzon with verandas, walls and the glazed connecting walkway | |

=== 3490 Kvistgård ===
| Listing name | Image | Location | Coordinates | Description | Ref |
|---|---|---|---|---|---|
| Fairy Hill | | Gurreholmvej 6A, 3490 Kvistgård | 1829 | House from 1820 with later changes | |
| Valdemarslund | | Gurrevej 447A, 3490 Kvistgård | 1830 | Main wing of half-timbered farm from the early 19th century but c. 1850 | |
| Valdemarslund | | Gurrevej 447A, 3490 Kvistgård | 1830 | Stable wing | |
| Valdemarslund | | Gurrevej 447A, 3490 Kvistgård | 1830 | Stable wing | |
| Valdemarslund | | Gurrevej 447A, 3490 Kvistgård | 1830 | Garden building | |
