= Trentwedel House =

Listed townhouse in Helsingør, Denmark

- Trentwedels Gård
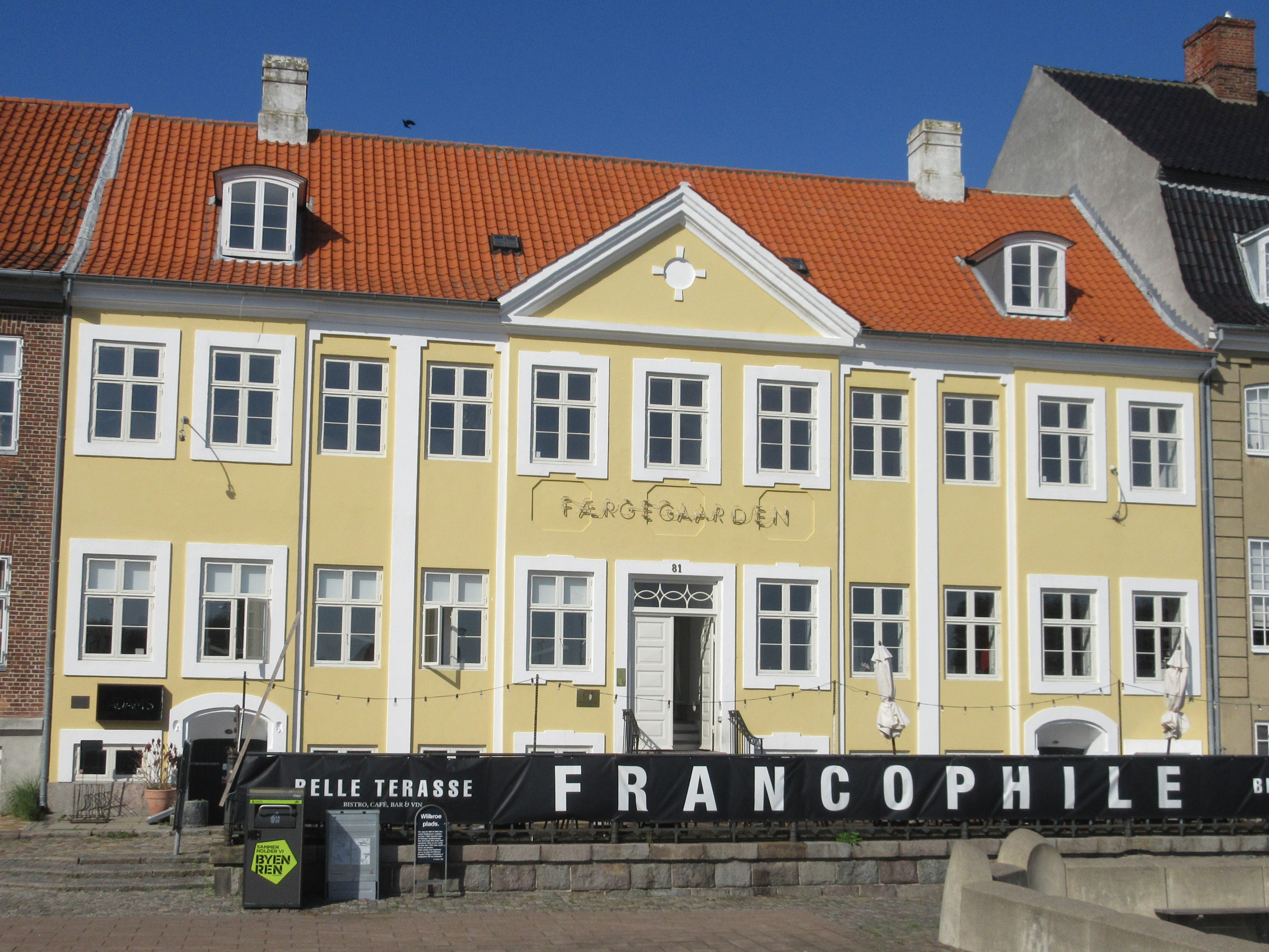

General information
- Architectural style: Baroque
- Location: Helsingøt, Stengade 81, 3000 Helsingør, Denmark
- Coordinates: 56°2′8.7″N 12°36′55.84″E
- Construction started: 1770

The Trentwedel House (Danish: Trentwedels Gård) is a Baroque style townhouse situated at Stengade 81 in central Helsingør, Denmark. It overlooks a small triangular plaza on the harbour front (Havnegade). The building was listed in the Danish registry of protected buildings and places in 1919.

== History ==
=== Van Deurs family ===
The merchant Jan van Deurs owned the property in 1682. It is likely that it had already been acquired by his father, Arent vand Deurs, a Dutch merchant, who settled in Helsingør in 1640.

=== Trentwedel and the new building ===
In 1719, Joachim Henrici acquired the property. His father was a friend of the van Deurs family. Joachim Henrici's wife Marie Tigh, whose father, Robert Tigh, was a prominent merchant and English consul to Helsingør. Marie Henrici kept the property after her husband's death in 1736. Their two daughters lived in the house after their mother's death in 1752. The daughter Margaret married in 1755 to Jørgen Trentwedel. He worked at the nearby Øresund Customs House. Ownership of the property on Stengade was subsequently transferred to him. He demolished the existing building. The present building on the site was completed in 188+. His old house at Sophie Brahes Gade 8 was subsequently let out. It was still owned by him in 1771. The neighbouring Osten House was completed around the same time for Trendwedel's superior, Wilhelm August von der Osten.

Trentwedel died in 1772. His widow and her sister resided in the building after his death.

=== Weise and de Meza, 1780–1810 ===
In 1780, Margareta sold the property to r Ludvig Weise. He died in 1798. The next owner of the house was city physician Christian Jacob Theophilus de Meza (1756–1844). He was the father of the later military officer Christian Julius de Meza (1792–1865).

In 1801, David Brown rented a couple of rooms in the house. He spent most of his time on his estate Gurrehus outside Helsingør. He died in 1804.

=== Thalbitzer family ===
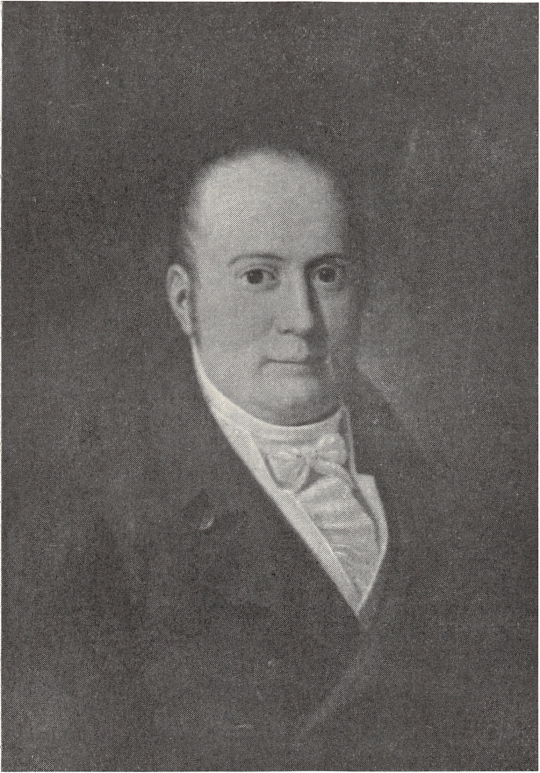
Charles Thalbitzer (1772–1814).

In 1810, Charles Thalbitzer (1772–1814) acquired the property (then No. 3+. later No. 88) in exchange for his old property at No. 21 (now Stengade 72–74).

Charles Thalbitzer ran the trading firm Salig Thalbitzer's Enke & Comp. in partnership with his brother Henry Thalbitzer. He was married to Frederikke Holm (1780–1836), a daughter of the trader and shipowner Christopher Engelbrechtsen Holm and Inger Louise Johanne Warnheim. They had the following children: Charles Frederik Thalbitzer, Louise Rebecca Thalbitzer, William Heinrich Thalbitzer, Ferdinand Emil Thalbitzer and Sophie Frederikke Charlotte Thalbitzer.

Charles and Henry Thalbitzer discontinued their partnership in 1811.Around the same time, Thalbitzer sold his property to Charles Lund, who already owned the property at Stengade 54. Since Charles Thalbitzer stayed in the building as a tenant, it seems likely that the purpose of the sale was to provide liquidity. After his death in 1814, his widow reacuiqred the building. The family's trading firm was continued by their son William Geinrich Thalbitzer. He also served as Austrian consul in Helsingør.

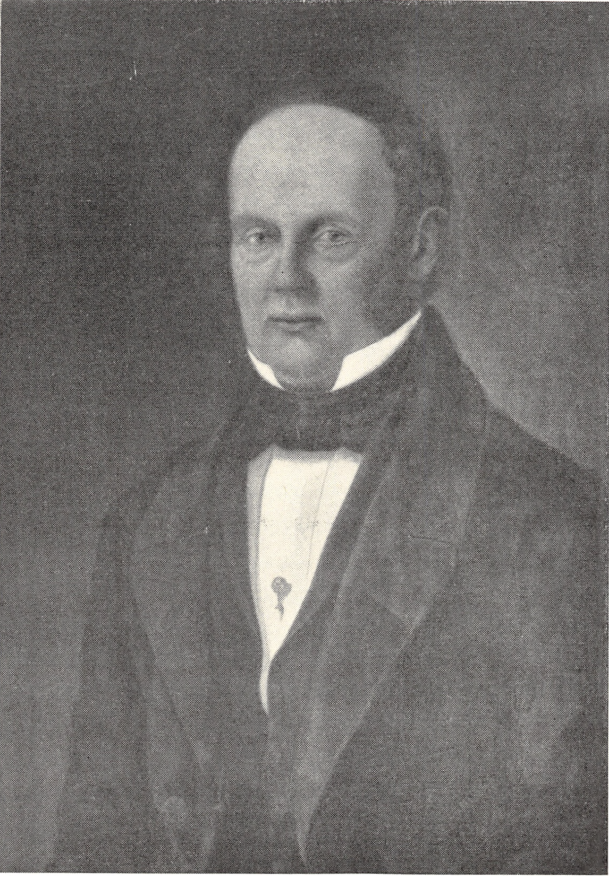
William Heinrich Thalbitzer (1803–69),.

Charles Thalbitzer's elder brother Henry Thalbitzer (1767–1818) was married to Sophie Dorothea Zinn (1774–1851), a daughter of the Copenhagen-based trader Johann Zinn. In her posthumously published memoirs, Bedstemors Bekjendelser (1906), she provides a detailed account of the family's life in the building.

Charles Thalbitzer died in 1914. His continued the firm with the assistance of a manager. The operations were later taken over by her son William Thalbitzer. In 1842, he bought Stengade No. 74 /old number) for use as a tobacco factory. In 1854, he bought the country house Birkehøj for 5,5000 Danish rigsdaler.

=== Later history ===
The wine merchant Sophus Rasmussen opened a wine shop in the building in 1892. It has later housed a number of different enterprises, including a law firm, a real estate agent, an architect, a medical clinic and a dental clinic.

== Architecture ==
Stengade 71 is constructed with two storeys over a walk-out basement. The 11-bay-long facade is crowned by a three-bay gabled wall dormer. Two side wings project from the rear side of the building along each their side of a central courtyard.
