= Valnøddevænget 10 =

Listed building in Helsingør, Denmark

Villa Højgaard
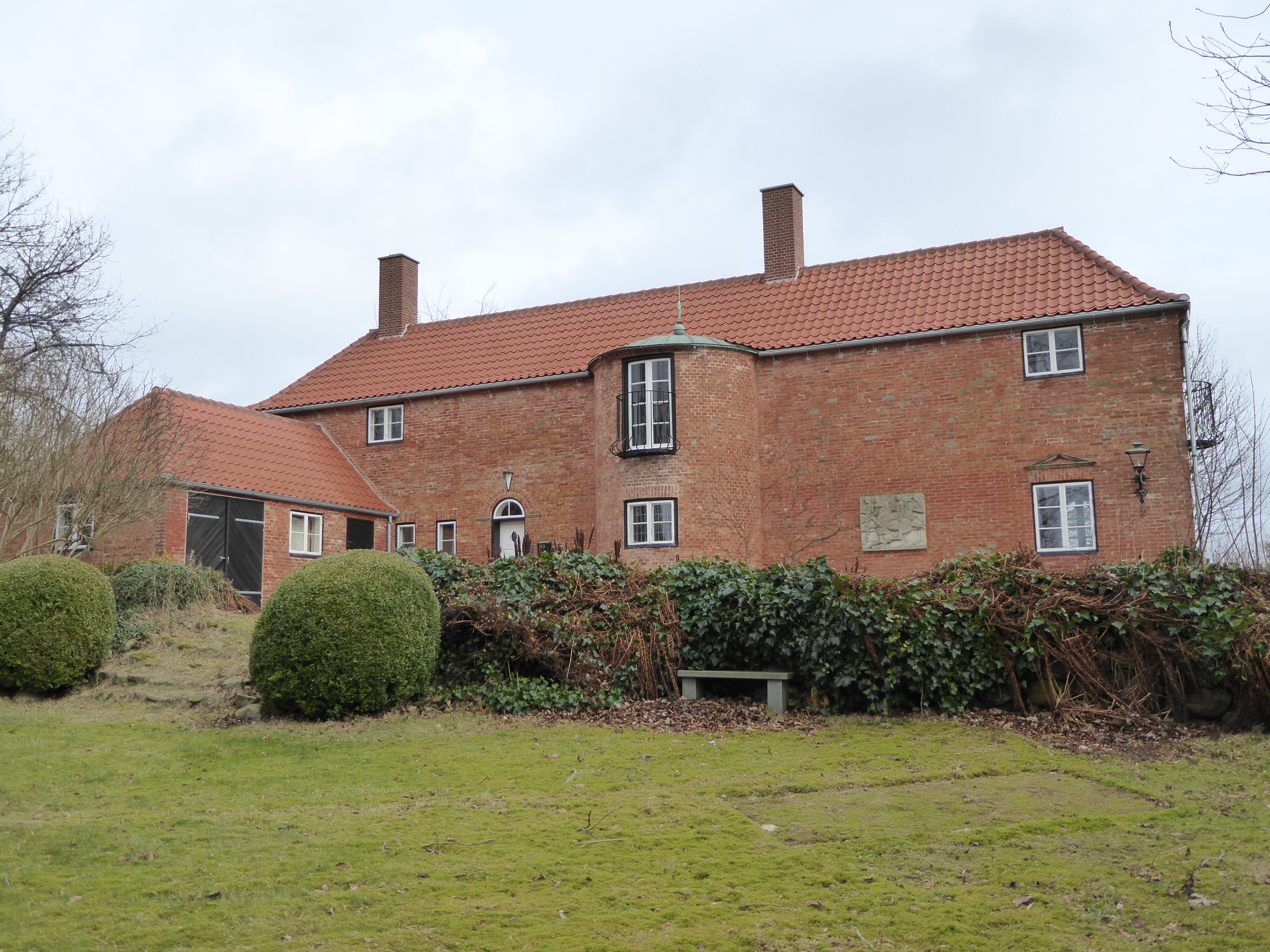
- Interactive map of the Villa Højgaard area

General information
- Location: Snekkersten, Helsingør, Valnøddevænget 10, Denmark
- Coordinates: 56°1′11.21″N 12°35′30.19″E
- Construction started: 1918

Design and construction
- Architect: Kay Fisker

Valnøddevænget 10, also known as Villa Gøjgaard, is a house designed by Kay Fisker in the Snekkersten district of Helsingør, Denmark. It was listed in the Danish registry of protected buildings and places in 1988.

== History ==
The house was constructed for Julius W. Friis, a manufacturer of bicycle pumps. Friis had bought a16,438 square metre parcel of land from Kronborg Vrickyard with the intention of building a country house on the site. He charged the just 23-year-old Kay Fisker with the design of the building after noticing his entry in Politiken's 1916 summerhouse competition. The house was constructed by Rønne-nased Frydenlund Byggeforretning og Maskinsnedkeri (Hansen & Hansen). Hisker had collaboration with the company in conjunction with his design of the station buildings on the Rønne–Gudhjem Rwailway on Bornholm. The house was completed in 1918.

In the 1940s, Villa Højgaard came into use as an all-year-round home. The garage adapted for use as an artist's studio. In 1978, it was converted into a kitchen. Over time, most of the land was parcelled out as 10 new lots (leaving approximately 2,800 square metres).

In June 2014, Realdania bought the building. It was subsequently put through a comprehensive renovation.

== Architecture ==
Villa Højgaard combines influences from Nordic Classicism and English cottage architecture (Baillie Scott). Gunnar Asplund's Villa Snellmann was a particular source of inspiration.

It consists of a narrow, two storey main wing and a low perpendicular garage wing. The garage was converted into an artists' studio in 1944, and, in 1978, into a kitchen. A semi-circular avant-corps, topped by a shallow, almost flat, copper-clad dome, projects from the west side of the main wing. The latter was Fisker's way of satisfying Friis' request for a tower. The main entrance is topped by a semicircular transom window. The windows are generally small. The relatively flat, hipped roof is clad in red tile. The roof ridge is pierced by two robust chimneys.

== Gallery ==
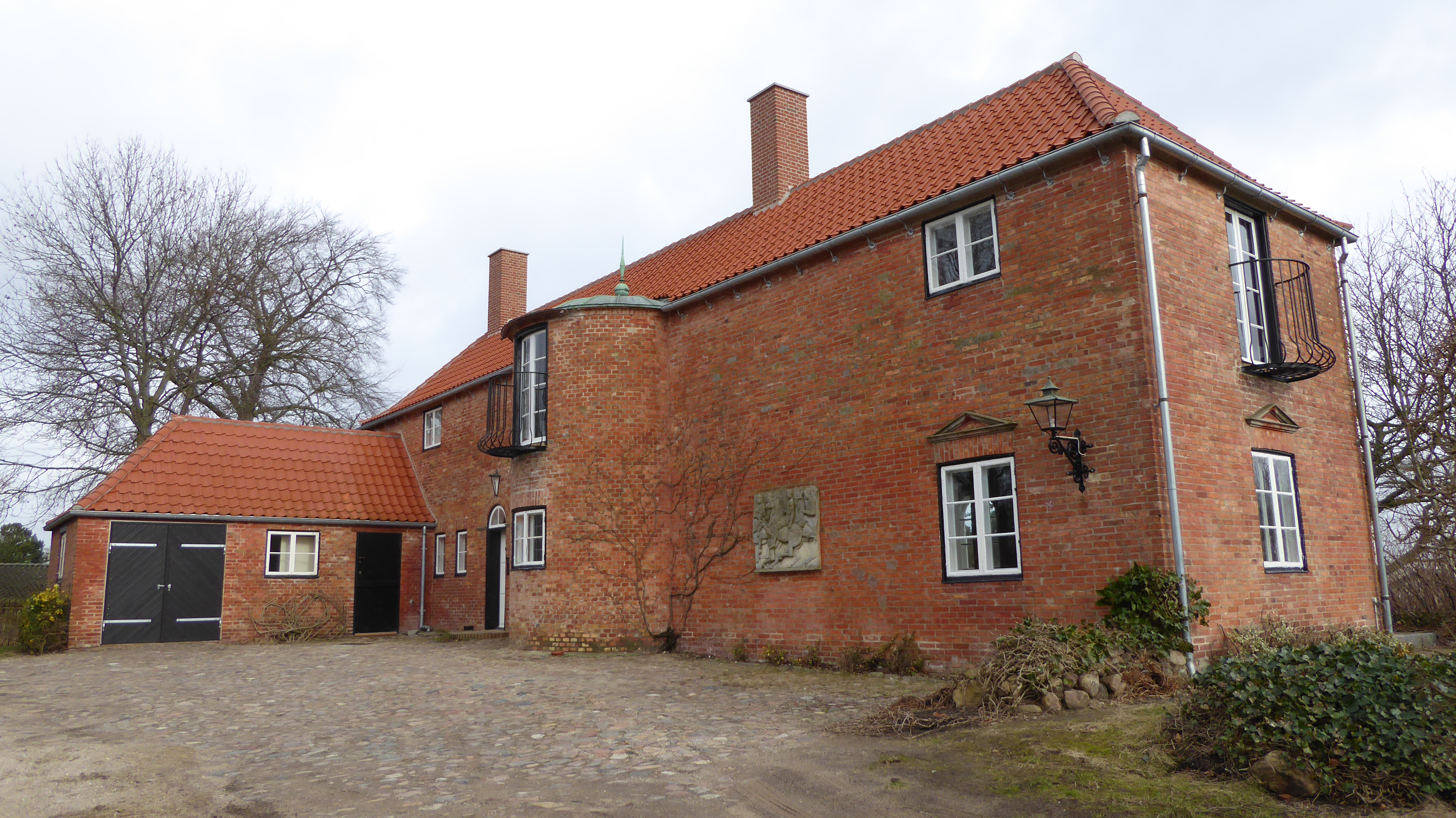

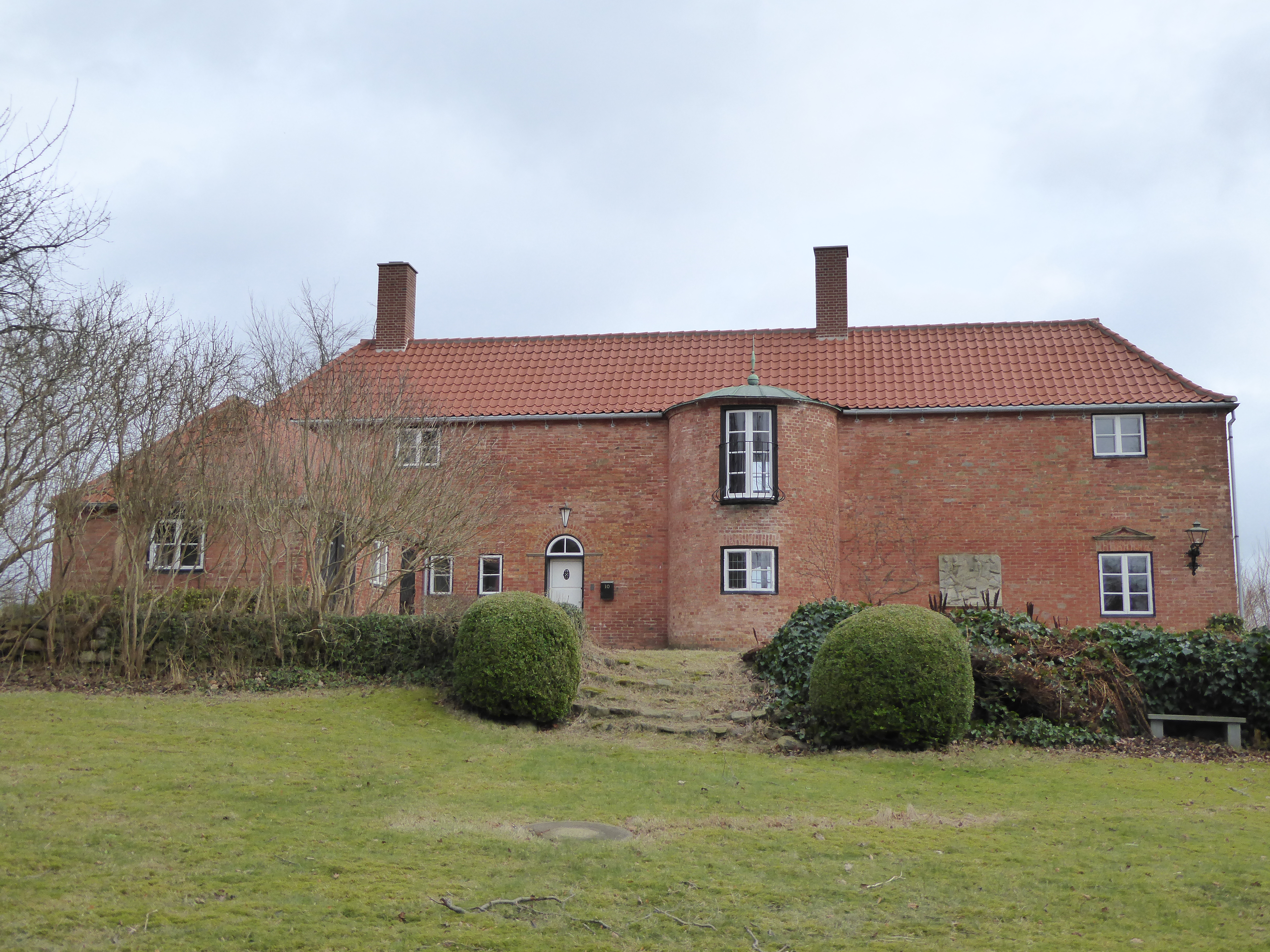

== See also ==
- Rågegården
- Rytterhuset
