= Danstruplund =

Country house in Denmark

- Interactive map of the Danstruplund area

General information
- Location: Copenhagen, Denmark
- Coordinates: 56°00′22.8″N 12°26′22.8″E
- Completed: 1850s
- Renovated: 1907

Danstruplund is a country house and former estate situated at the hamlet of Lille Esbønderup, between Helsingør and Fredensborg, some 35 km north of Copenhagen, Denmark.

== History ==
Danstruplund originates in one of four historic farms in the hamlet of Lille Esbønderup and was formerly known as Landlyst. In around 1806, Landlyst relocated to a new site to the south of the village. In 1839, Landlyst was merged with Kasserud in Jonstrup. In 1854, it was merged with Enghavegaard in Endrup. The estate had now grown to approximately 125 hectares (250 tønder), making it one of the largest farms in the area. It was from 1859 to 1892 owned by Harald Nielsen. The next owner was Olaf E. Poulsen. In 1900, he was granted permission to rename the estate Danstruplund.

In 1906, Danstruplund was acquired by the businessman Emil Hjort, owner of the textile company S. Seidelin in Copenhagen. A private power station was the same year constructed on the estate. The main building was refurbished the following year.

In 1924, Danstruplund was sold to Joachim Prahl. He had served as the Danish agent of the White Star Line. In 1926, he redesigned the 2.5-hectare garden.

In 1936, Danstruplund was acquired by Christian Larsen, owner of the entertainment venue Valencia on Vesterbrogade in Copenhagen.

Larsen kept Danstruplund until 1947. In the 1950s, it changed hands several times. In 1966. it was acquired by master mason Hans Egeskov. His family kept the estate until 1983 when it was acquired by Grethe and Klaus Helmersen. Their clothing company Carly Gry International was also operated from the premises. The remaining farmland was sold to neighbouring Esrumgaard. In 2006, Danstruplund was acquired by Ole Astrup Madsen's company Danstruplund ApS. Some of the buildings were let out as office space while others remained empty. In 2020, Danstruplund was once again put on the market.

== See also ==
- Fairyhill (Helsingør)
