= Osten House =

- Ostens Gård
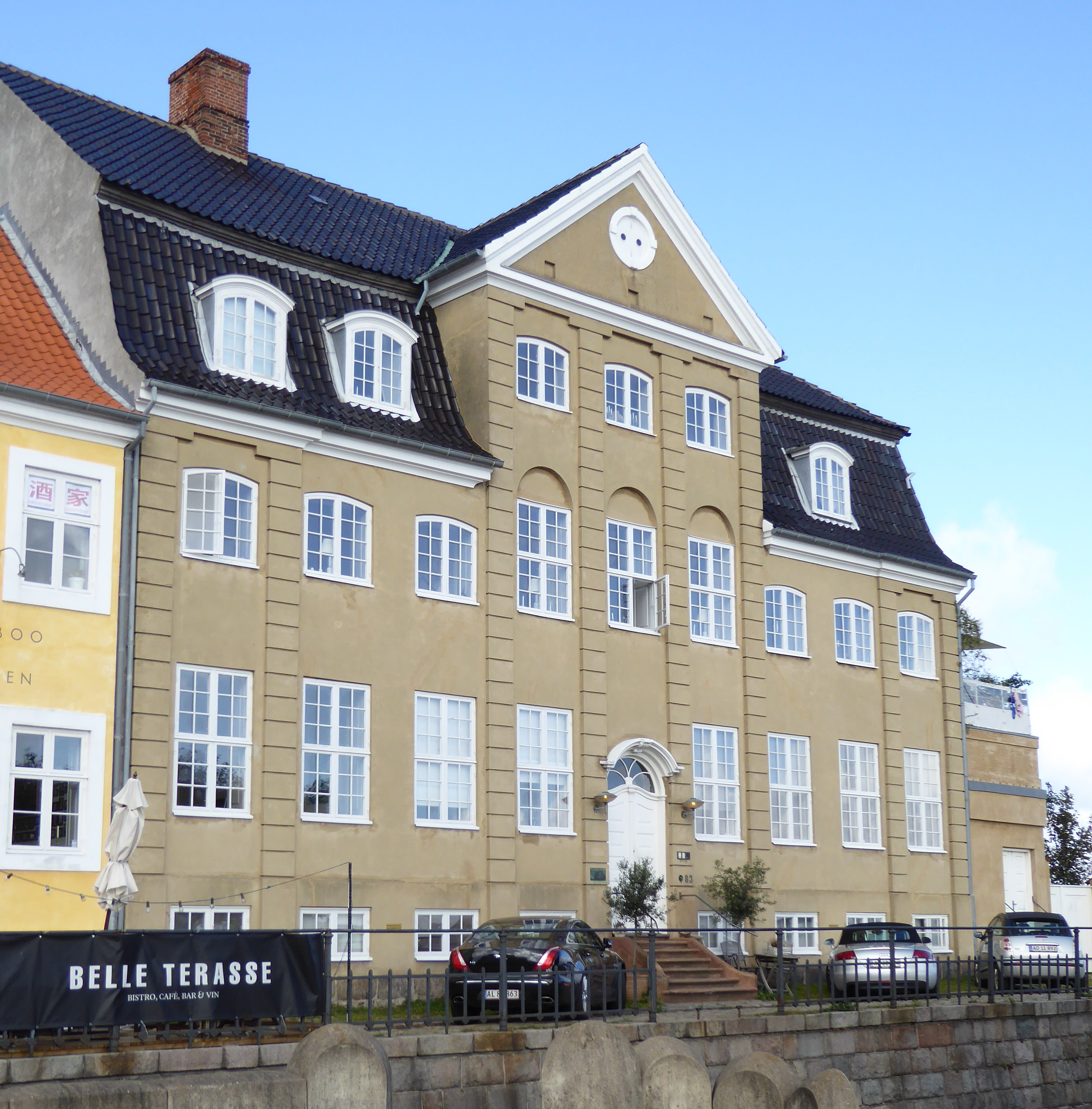
- Interactive map of the Osten House area

General information
- Architectural style: Rococo
- Location: Helsingør, Denmark
- Coordinates: 56°2′9″N 12°36′56.58″E
- Completed: 1770
- Client: Otto Frantz von der Osten

The Osten House (Danish: Ostens Gård) is a Rococo-style townhouse located at Stengade 83 in Helsingør, Denmark. The building was listed on the Danish registry of protected buildings and places in 1918.

== History ==
Customs inspector Hans Jørgen Schrøder owned a property at the site in 1736. Otto Frantz von der Osten acquired the building after being appointed customs commissioner at Øresund Custom House. He constructed the current building at the site in 1769-1770. The architect is not known.

Otto Frantz von der Osten's younger brother, Adolph Sigfried von der Osten, had been appointed director of Øresund Custom House by Struense in 1770. Their cousin, Wilhelm August von der Osten (1694-1768), had served as director of Øresund Customs House from 1738 to 1764.

Nicolai Jacob Jessen (1718-1800), who had been appointed an accountant at Øresund Custom House in 1778, acquired the building in 1780. He had played an important role in the coup against Struense.

Joost Jacob van Aller (1756-1824), a merchant and Dutch consul in Helsingør, acquired the building in 1794. His widow continued his trading house after his death in 1824. It was later passed on to their sons Peter, Hendrik and Theodor. The property was owned by the House of de Coninck from 1867 to 1878.

Stengade 83 was acquired by the Wright family in 1901. The family founded the fuel company Wright and Svendsen. A wide variety of companies have since been tenants in the building.

== Cultural references ==
Karen Blixen's short story "The Supper at Elsinore" in Seven Gothic Tales is set in the building.
