= Sanct Olai Gade 55 =

Listed building in Helsingør, Denmark

Sanct Olaigade 55
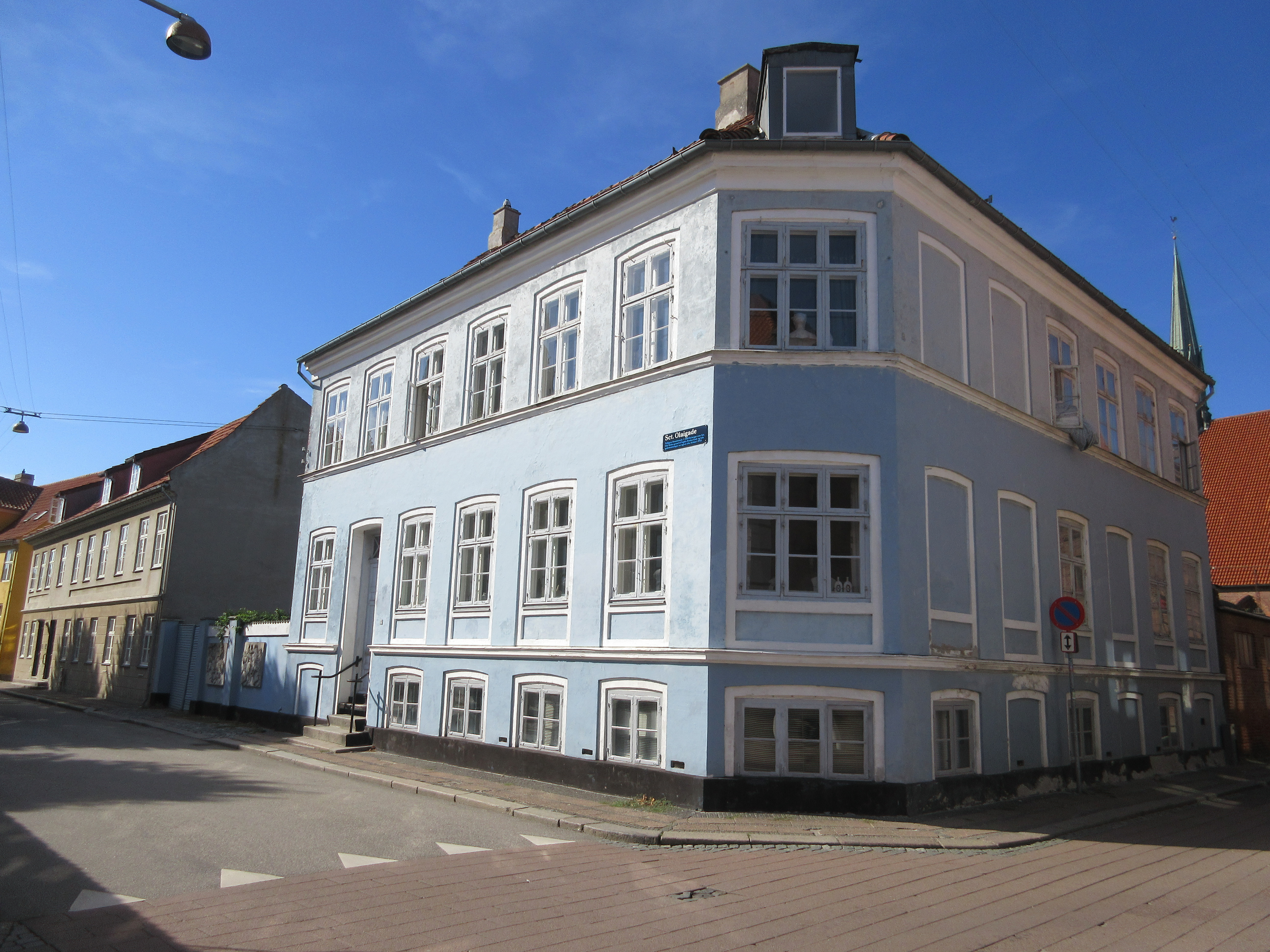
- Interactive map of the Sanct Olaigade 55 area

General information
- Location: Helsingør, Sanct Olaigade 55, 3000 Helsingør, Denmark
- Coordinates: 56°2′10.72″N 12°36′50.83″E
- Construction started: 1852

Sanct Olaigade 55 (often abbreviated Sct. Olai Gade 55; sometimes spelled Sankt Olai Gade 55) is a mid 19th-century apartment building situated at the corner of Sanct Olaigade and Sophie Brahes Gade in central Helsingør, Denmark. It was listed in the Danish registry of protected buildings and places in 1945.

== History ==
Sanct Olaigade 55 was constructed in 1852 for the businessman (grosserer) Johan Peter Lundwall (1801–1867).

Lundwall had worked for Salig Arent van Deurs' Enke. In 1829, he married Cathrine Marie Gundersen. In 1834, he started his own ship's agent business, Lundwall's home was at Strandgade 92 (acquired 1830). His firm was also based in the building. In 1835, he also bought Strandgade 94. This site was used for the construction of a building with hotel rooms for ship captains. The building at Sanct Olai Gade 55 was most likely built as an investment. Lundwall's daughter Hildebrand, who married a ship's agent at Strandgade 71, wrote her memoirs in the 1920s (published posthumously in 1985). She does not mention the building in Sanct Olai Gade.

Back in 1844, Lundwall had also bought a property outside the city (present-day Belvederevej). In the 1850s, he constructed the country house Belbedere on the land.

== Architecture ==
Sanct Olai Gade 55 is constructed with two floors over a walk-out basement. It has a six-bay-long principal façade on Sanct Olai Gade, a four-bay-long secondary façade on Sophie Brahes Gade and a chamfered corner. Some of the windows towards Sophie Brahes Gade have been bricked-up. The main entrance is located in the second bay from the left on Sanct Olai Gade. The pitched roof is clad in red tile. The roof ridge is pierced by two chimneys.
