= Valdemarslund =

Listed building in Helsingør Municipality, Denmark

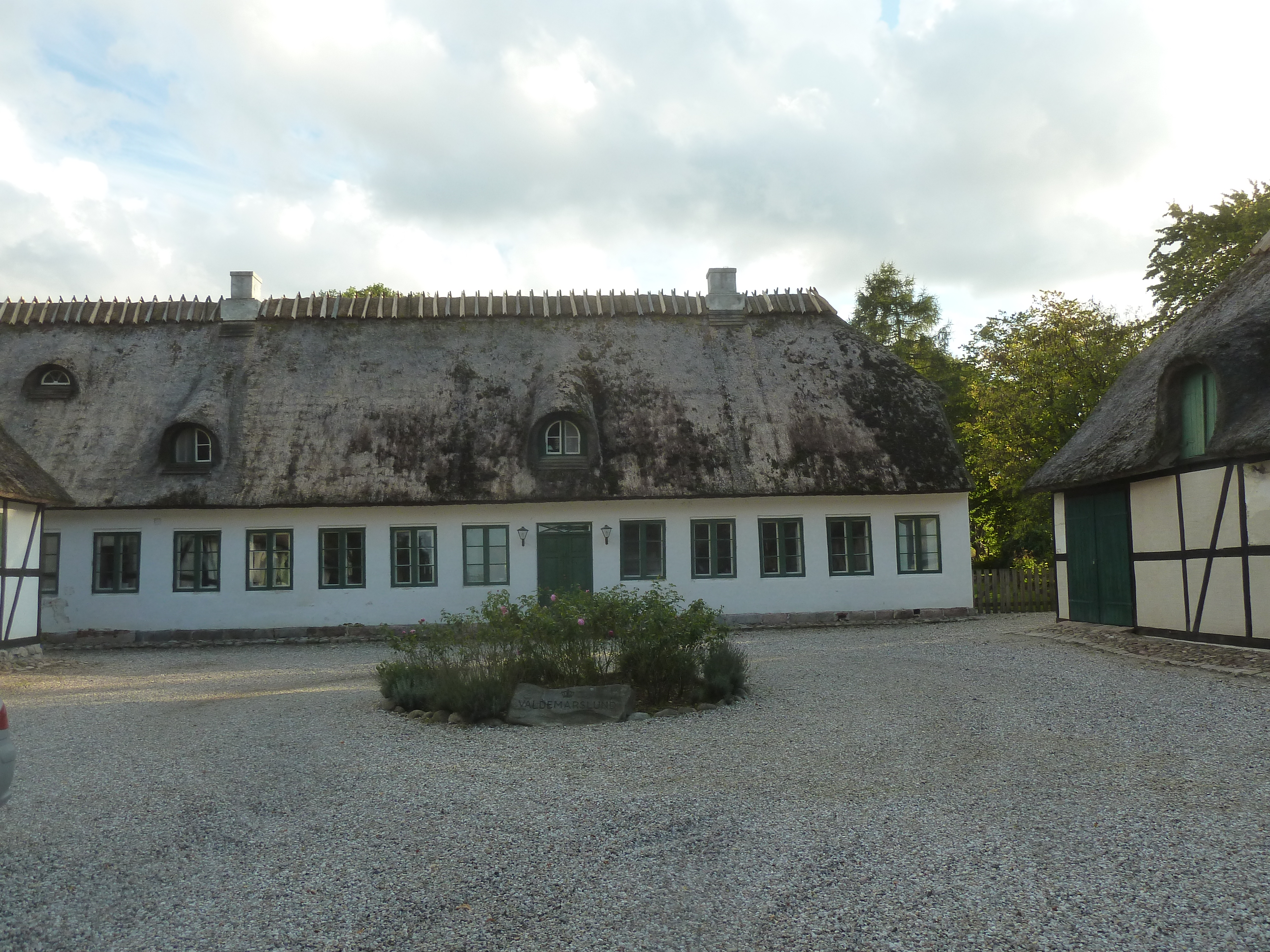
- Interactive map of the Valdemarslund area

General information
- Location: Helsingøt, Gurrevej 447A, 3490 Kvistgård, Denmark
- Coordinates: 56°1′6.78″N 12°29′45.82″E
- Construction started: c. 1805

Valdemarslund is a three-winged, half-timbered farmhouse situated on Gurrevej, between Tikøb and Gurre, a few kilometres west of Helsingør, Denmark. The building served as the official residence of the local chief forester until 1970. The three-winged main building and a detached building in the garden were listed in the Danish registry of protected buildings and places in 1982.

== History ==
=== Early history ===
The three-winged building was constructed in around 1805. The building served as the official residence of the local chief forester (skovrider).

Henrich Georg Friedrich Fischer (1782–1829 resided at Valdemarslund in his capacity of chief forester of Hørsholm Forest District (appointed 20 February 1810).

=== Sophus Magnus Bjørnsen, 1829–1857 ===
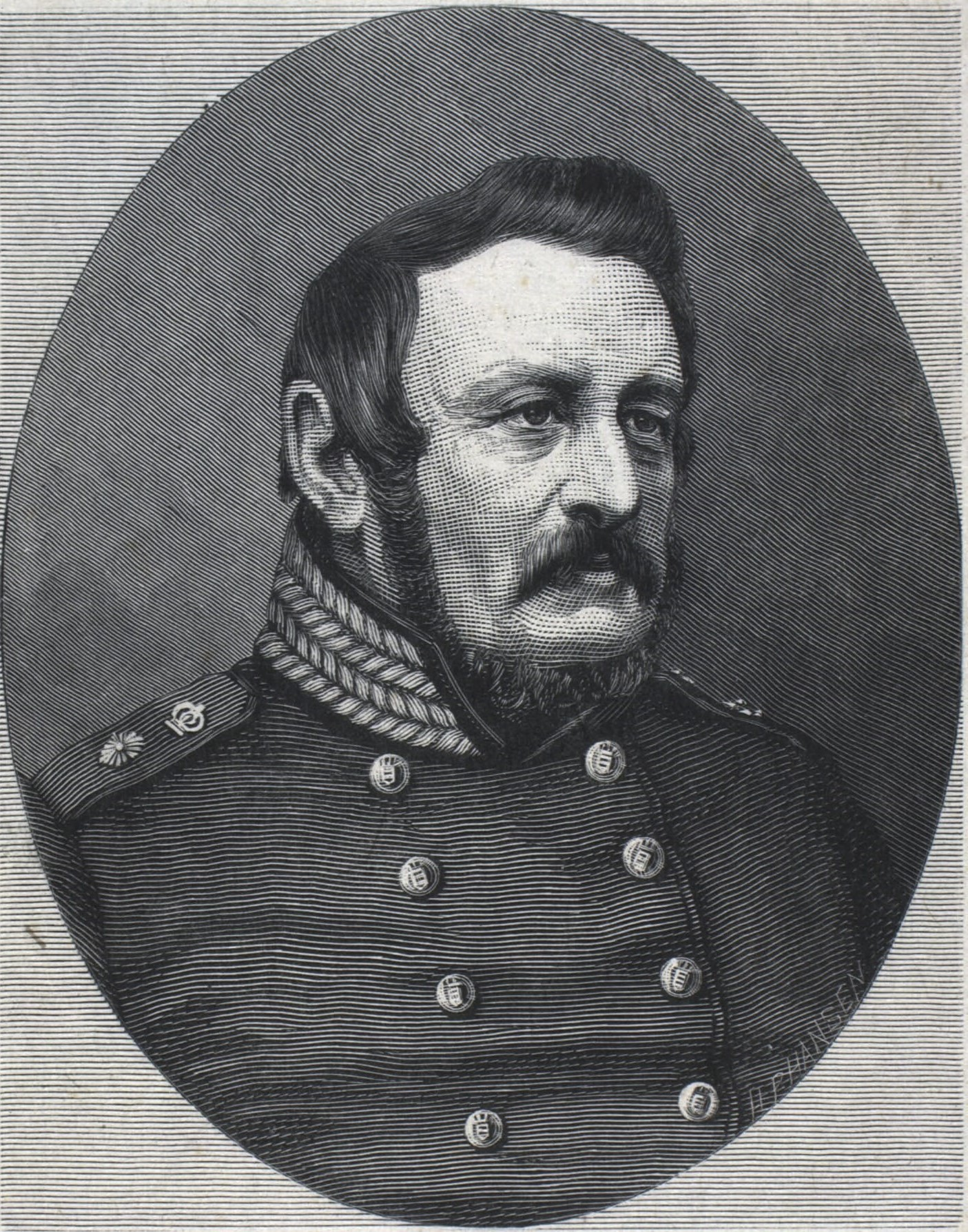
Sophus Magnus Bjørnsen.

The next chief forester at Valdemarslund was Sophus Magnus Bjørnsen (1790–1857). In 1829, he was appointed as chief forester of the 2nd Kronborg For4est District. Bjørnsen was an innovative forester and farmer. He played an important role in the local community by acting as a consultant for local farmers.

. His annual six-day hunts were attended by people such as the businessman Niels Peter Kirck and the medical doctor Frederik Wilhelm Galschiøt from Helsingør as well as J. C. Drewsen from Strandmøllen. Bjørnsen was also involved in the excavation of Gurre Castle ruin.

In 1841, he also bought Marianelyst Inn. His son Jacob Bjørnsen was a veterinarian.

=== Later chief foresters, 1857–1970 ===
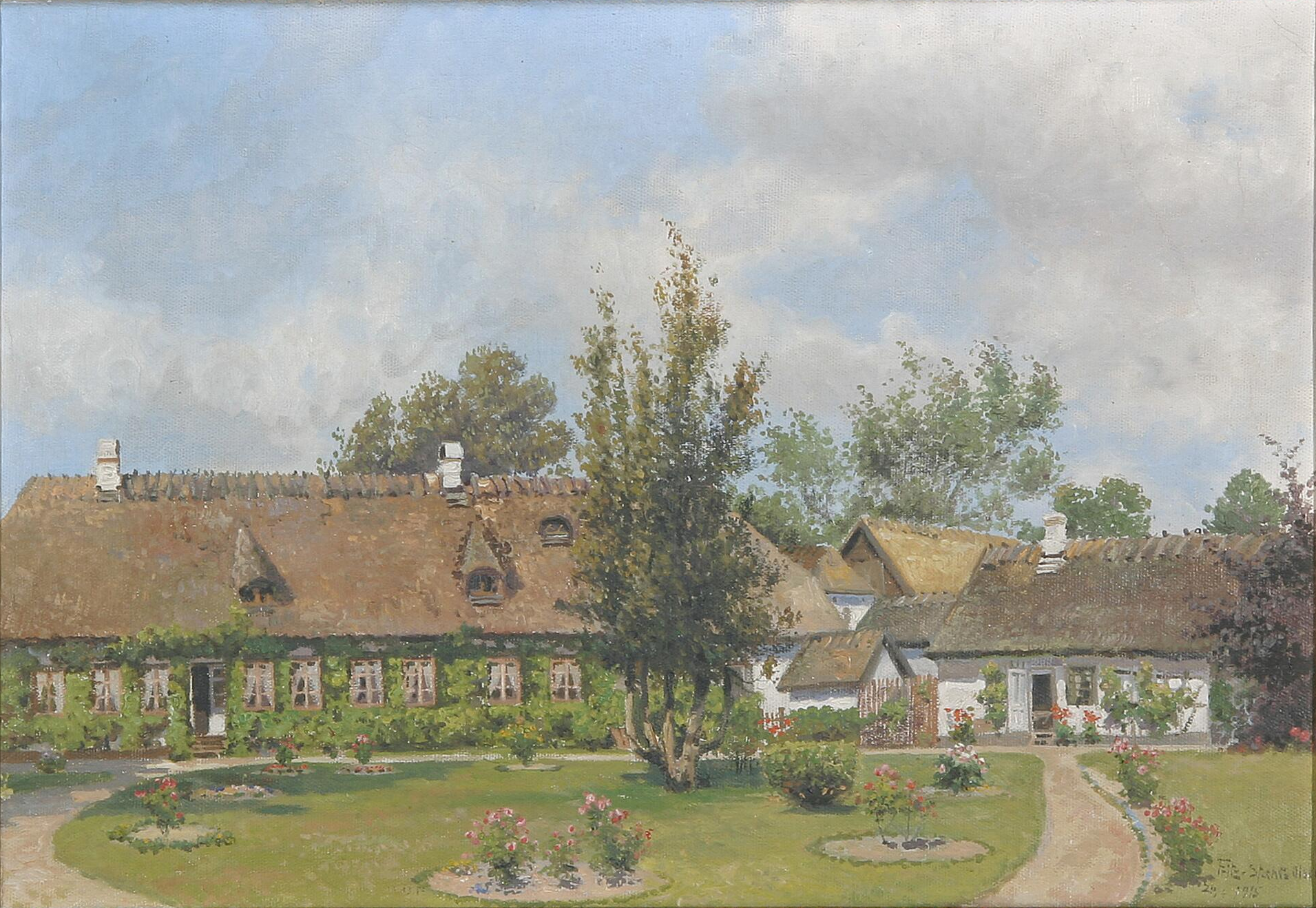
Fritz Stækr-Olsen: Valdemarslund in Gurre, 1915.

Bjørnsen was succeeded by Joachim Godske Nyholm (1799–1976) as chief forester of the 2nd Kronborg Forest District. (appointed 21 November 1857).

The next chief forester at Valdemarslund was Heinrich Schade (1836–1916). On 17 July 1876, he was appointed as chief forester of the 2nd Kronborg Forest Fistrict. He was dismissed on 1 May 1902.
