= Fairyhill =

Fairyhill may refer to:

- Fairyhill (village), a locality on Gower Peninsula
- Fairyhill, Reynoldston, a hotel near Swansea
- Fairyhill (Helsingør), an English-style country house outside Helsingør, Denmark
