= Iver Pedersen House =

Listed townhouse in Helsingør, Denmark

- Iver Pedersens Gprd
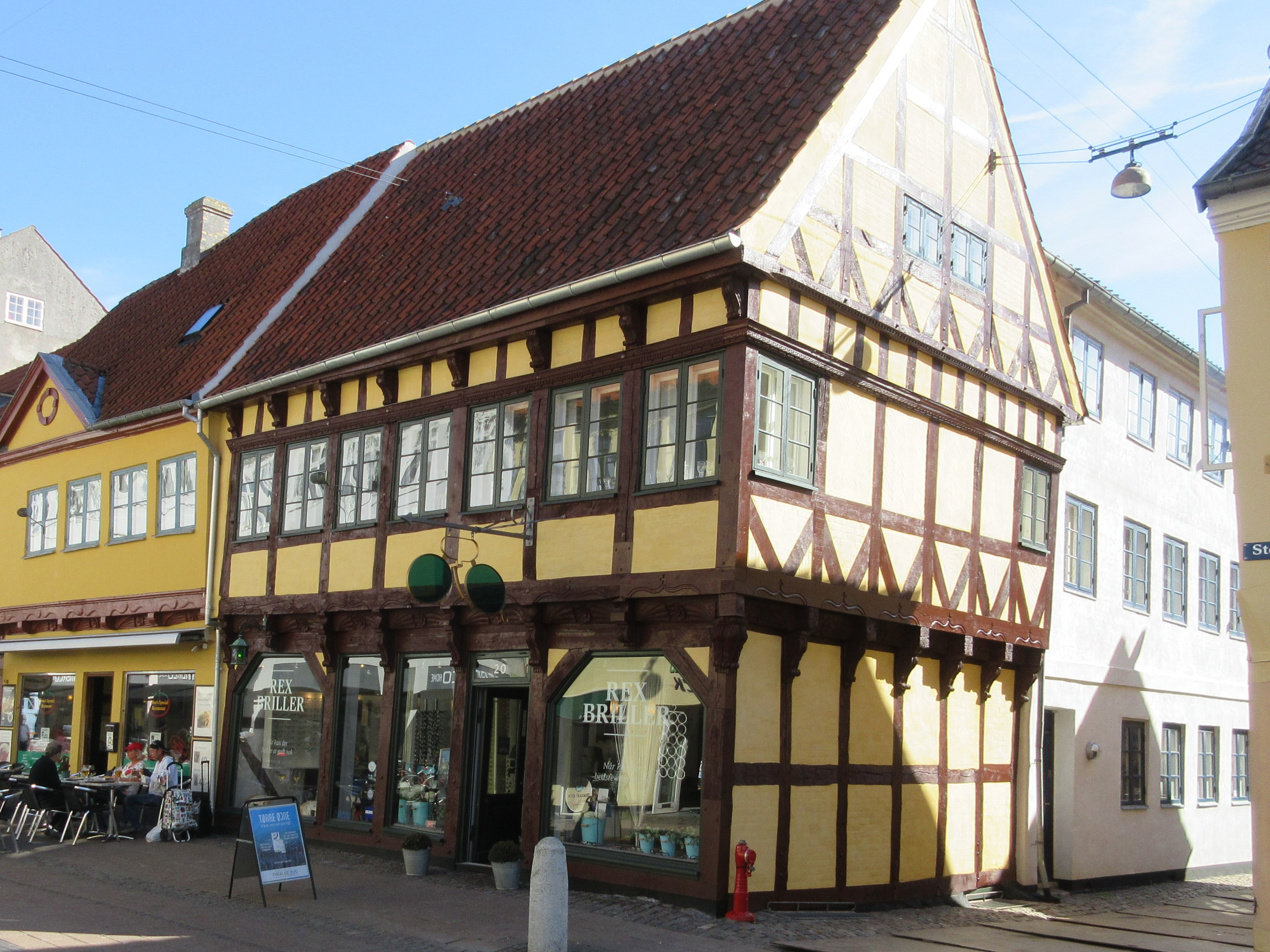
- Interactive map of the Iver Pedersen House area

General information
- Location: Helsingøt, Stengade 20, 3000 Helsingør, Denmark
- Coordinates: 56°1′59.12″N 12°36′35.42″E
- Construction started: c, 1600

The Iver Pedersen House (Danish: Iver Pedersens Gård) is one of the oldest half-timbered buildings in Helsingør, Denmark. It was listed in the Danish registry of protected buildings and places in 1919.

== History ==
The corner building dates from circa 1700. The identity of its first owner is not known. It was later acquired by Iver Petersen (died 1660). He served as mayor of Helsingør from 1636 to 1638. The house was later owned by Jens Vagtmester and let out to ferryman Hans Quie. The nearby street Anna Queensstræde takes its name after the latter's wife Anna.

The Association for the Preservation of Historic Buildings (Foreningen til gamle bygningers bevaring) undertook a renovation of the building in 1911. It was listed in the Danish registry of protected buildings and places in 1919.
