= Strandgade 71, Helsingør =

Listed townhouse in Helsingør, Denmark

Strandgade 71
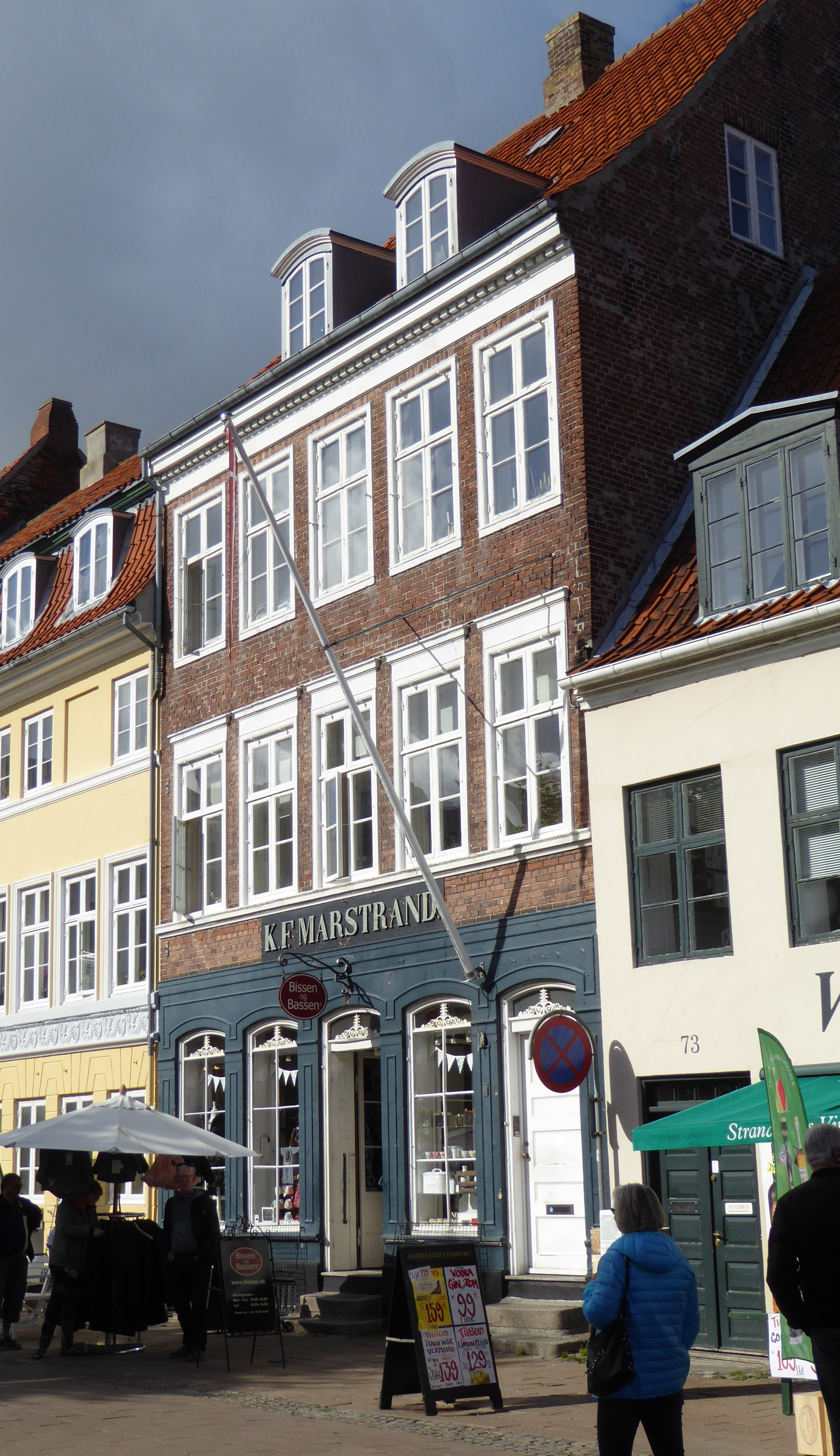
- Interactive map of the Strandgade 71 area

General information
- Location: Helsingøt, Strandgade 71, 3000 Helsingør, Denmark
- Coordinates: 56°2′3.26″N 12°36′49.14″E
- Construction started: 1770

Strandgade 71 is a building situated opposite Helsingør Customs House in central Helsingør, Denmark which was constructed in the 1840s. The ship chandlery business K. F. Marstrand' (from 1875: K. F. Marstran's Efterfølger) was located in the building until 1981. The building was listed in the Danish registry of protected buildings and places in 1983. The Lorcj House and Skibsklarerergaarden a few houses further down the same street were also the site of ship chandlery businesses.

== History ==
=== K. F. Marstrand ===
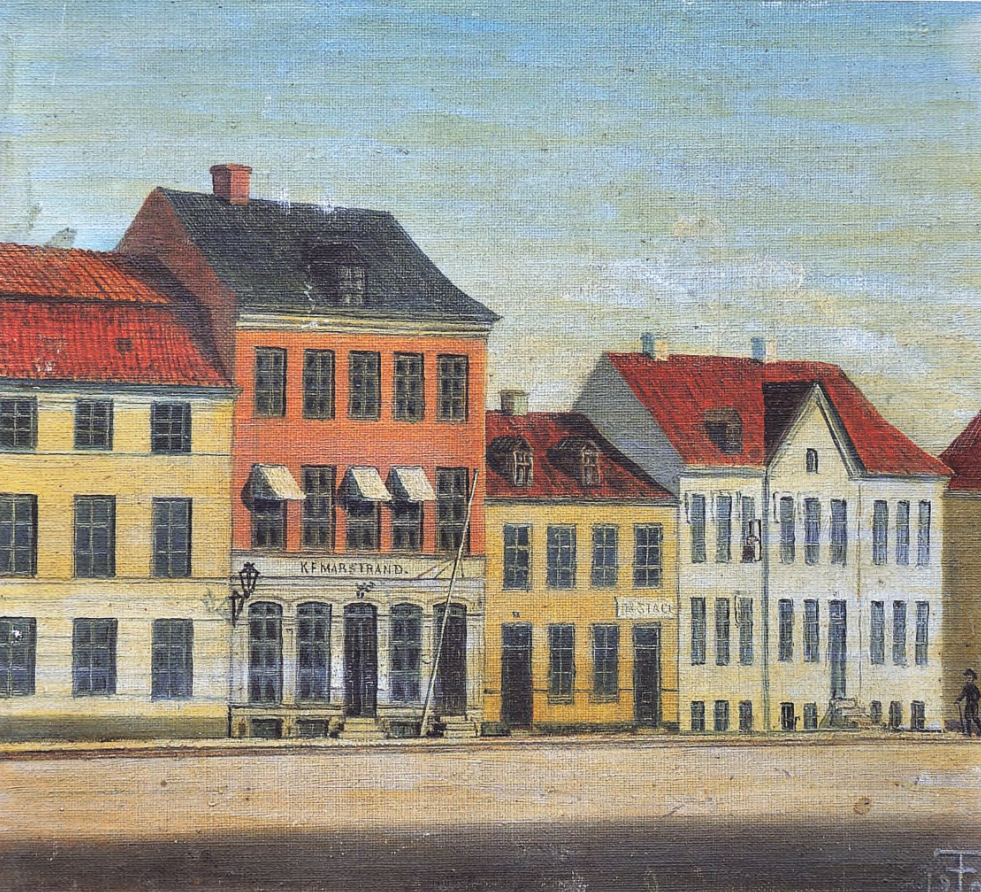
Strandgade 69-75-

The property was acquired by Kragh Frederik Marstrand (1804–1887) in around 1833. On 1 May 1833, he established a ship chandlery business in his new building. An important part of Marstrand's business consisted of the handling of the paperwork for the many ships that called at Helsingør in conjunction with the payment of Sound Dues. In 1836, Marstrand joined Helsingør Shooting Society.

The present building on the site was constructed for Marstrand in 1846–47.

When the Sound Dues were abolished in 1857, part of Marstrand's business disappeared. He later moved into pyjrt nisomess areas, for instance by biying his own sailing ships.

His son Peter Frederik Marstrand (1826–1878) was a ship captain. He was intended to take over the firm but died just a few months after the father's retiremtn.

=== K. F. Marstrand's Efterfølger, 1875–1982 ===
Marstrand retired in 1875. The firm was then continued by P. J. Razga and N. A. C. Sørensen as K. F. Marstrand's Efterfølger ("K. F. Marstrand's Successor"). Razga became the sole owner of the company in 1892. He was married to Hildegard Lundwall, a daughter of Johan Peter Lundwall (Strandgade 92, demolished). They lived on the first floor. In the 1920s, Hildegard Rázga (néeLundwall) wrote her childhood memoirs (posthumously published in 1985).

In 1906, K. F. Marstrand's Efterfølger was acquired by F. C. Brûnnich (1853–1920) and P. V. Svendsen (1869–1943). In 1913, K. D. Marstrand's Eftf. took over the adjacent building at Strandgade 73. The building at Strandgade 69 had already been taken over by the firm at this point. In the middle of the 1940s, it was sold to Julius Kopp (born 1871).

K. F. Marstrand's Efterfølger closed in 1981 as the last of the old ship chandlery businesses in Helsingør. The building was listed in the Danish registry of protected buildings and places in 1983.

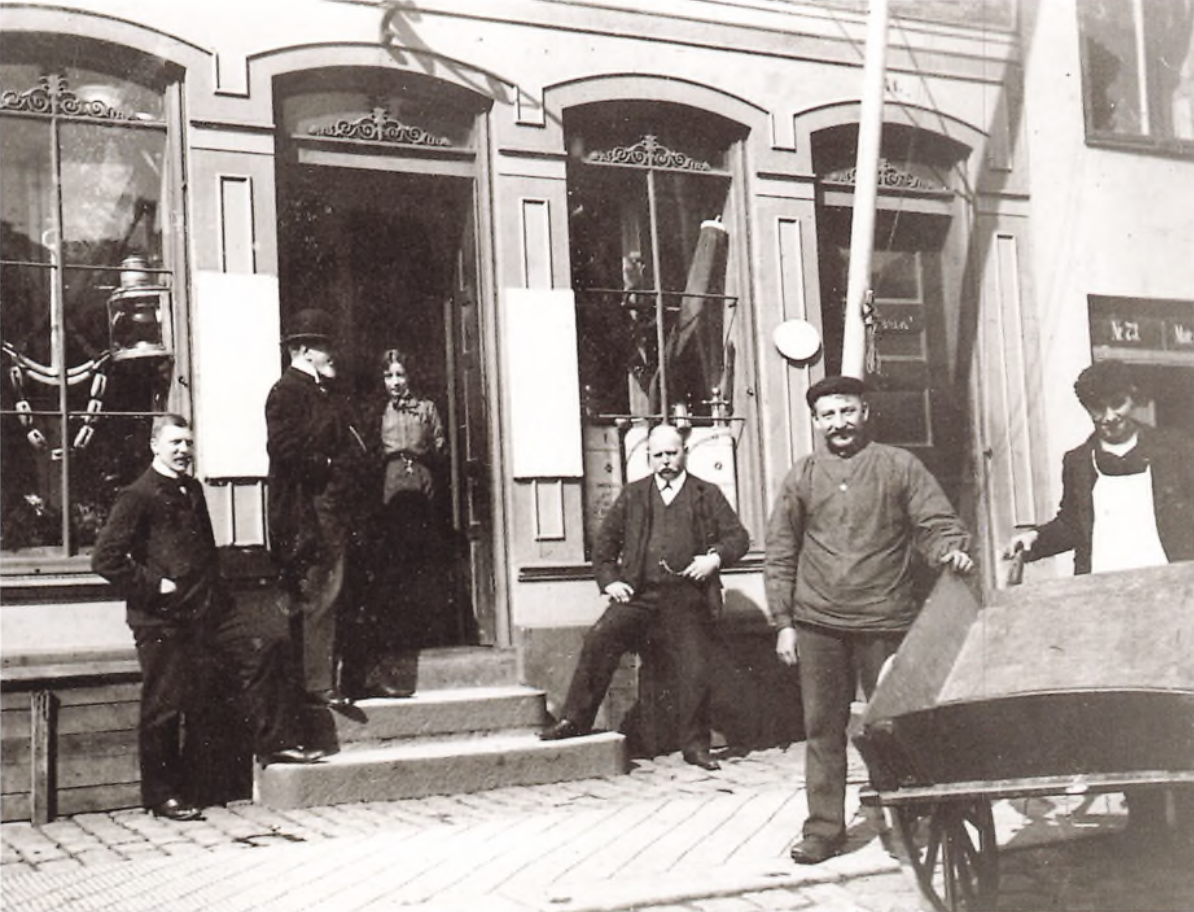
K. F. Marstrand's Efterfølger employees.

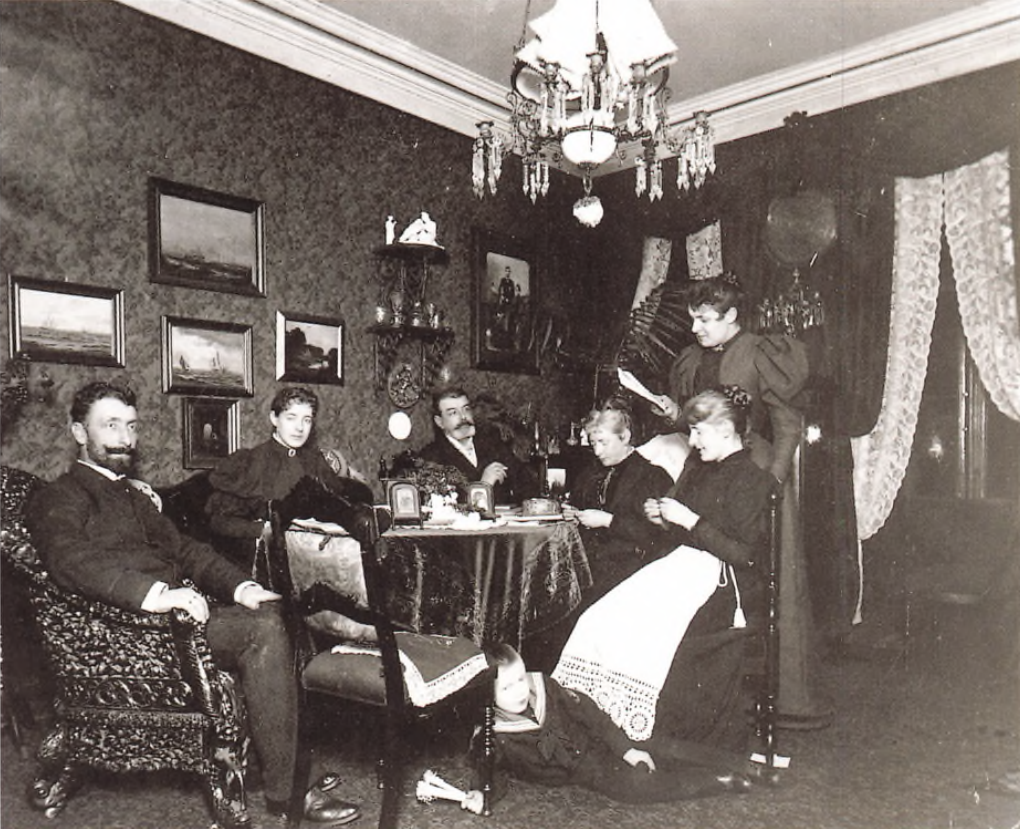
The Råzga family in their home at Strandgade 71.

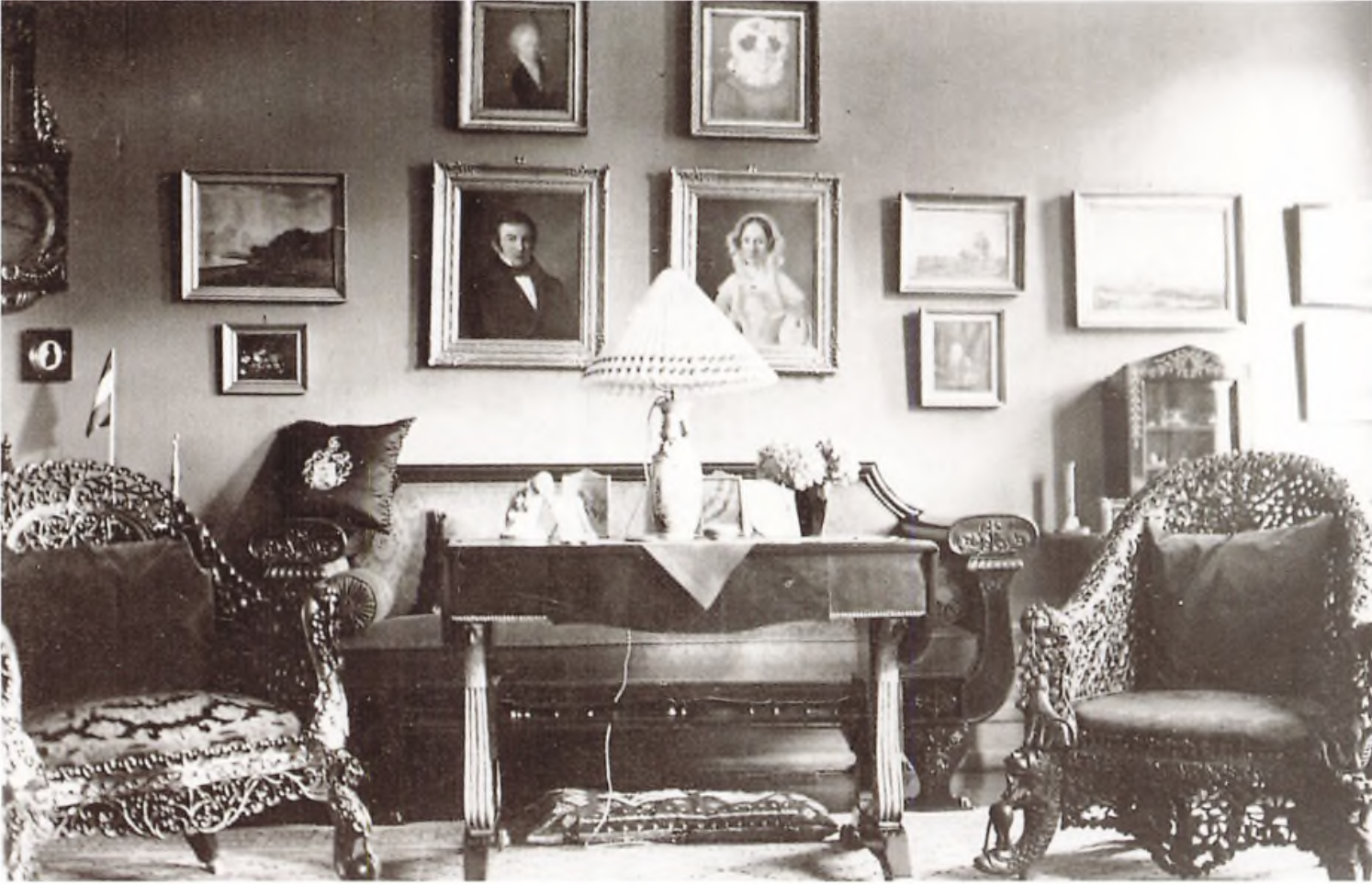
Hildegard Råzgas's æiving room.

== Today ==
The building contains a shop on the ground floor and office space on the upper floors.

== Cultural references ==
The building was used as a location in the film Styrmand Karlsen.
