= Ålsgårde =

Seaside resort in North Zealand, Denmark

Coordinates: 56°04′36″N 12°32′13″E

Location of Ålsgårde in Denmark

Ålsgårde is a seaside resort and former fishing village on the north coast of Zealand, Denmark, located six kilometers northwest of Helsingør.

Formerly Ålsgårde was a separate town, but today it has merged with the neighbouring town of Hellebæk into an urban area with a population of 5,765 (1 January 2026).

== Notable buildings ==
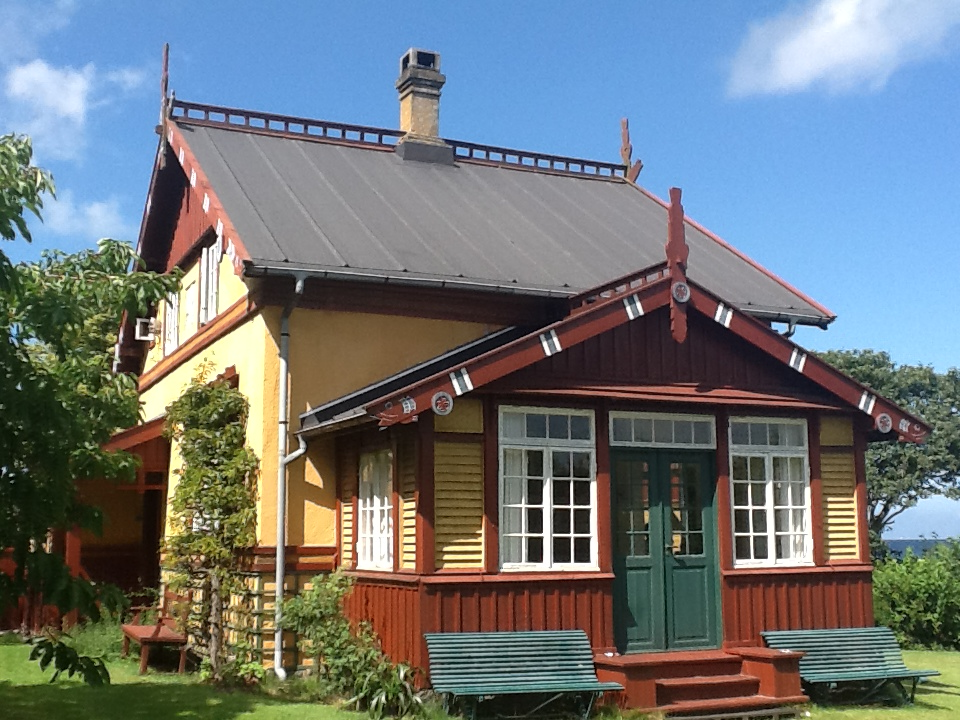
Rytterhuset, a listed summerhouse from 1899

Rytterhuset (Nordre Strandvej 230) was built in 1889 as summer residence for the painter Frants Henningsen to a National Romantic design by Martin Nyrop. The property, including a jetty with a bathhouse and a couple of outbuildings, is now listed in the Danish registry of protected buildings and places. Nordre Strandvej 140, a half-timbered house from 1819, is also listed. Hellebæk Church is, in spite of its name, also located in Ålsgårde.

== Notable people ==
- Laura Kieler (1849 – 1932 in Ålsgårde) a Norwegian-Danish novelist
- August Hassel (1864 – 1942 in Ålsgårde) a Danish sculptor.
- Harald Leth (1899 – 1986 in Ålsgårde) a Danish naturalistic painter
- Emil Bergreen (1993-now) a Danish football player
