= Dodt House =

Listed building in Helsingør, Denmark

- Dodts gård
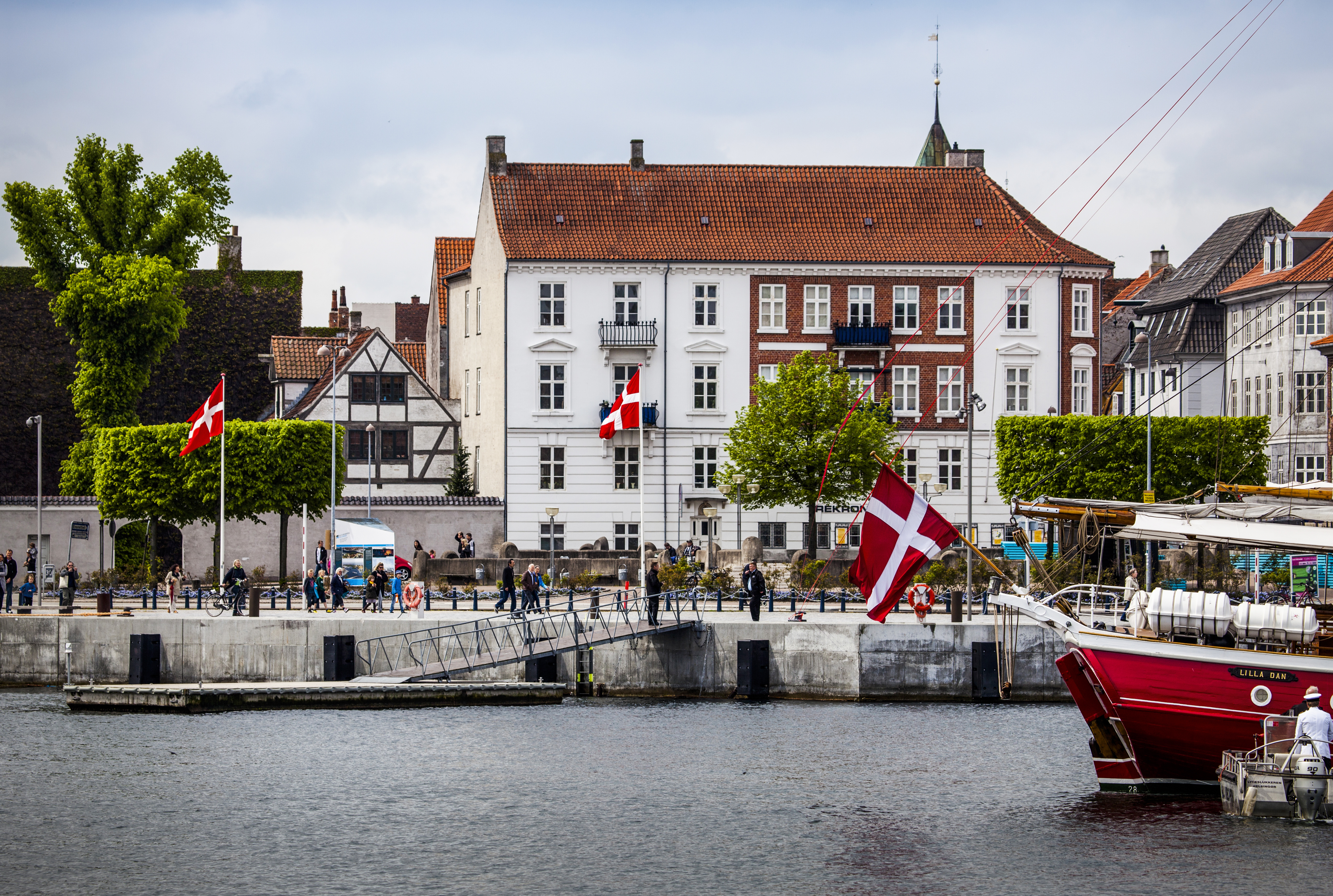
- Interactive map of the Dodt House area

General information
- Location: Helsingør, Stengade 84 og Sophie Brahes Gade 3 A, 3000 Helsingør, Denmark
- Coordinates: 56°2′7.4″N 12°36′55.48″E
- Construction started: 1835 (Stengade 77); 1736 (Sophie Brahes Gade 5B)

The Dodt House (Danish: Dodts Gård) is a property at the corner of Stengade (No. 84) and Wibroe Plads (Sophie Brahes Gade No. 3A) in central Helsingør, Denmark. The building complex was listed in the Danish registry of protected buildings and places in 1919.

== History ==
=== Dodt family ===
The corner building on Stengade was constructed in 1783 for Dutch agent Arent Henrich Dodt (1733–1811).

Dodt was married to Suzanne Marie van Dochum. Their daughter Mary Ann Dodt (1766–1854) was married twice, first to Stephan Arend van Deurs and then to the English-born merchant John David Belfour (1754–1795). She owned Marianelund outside Helsingør. The son Frans Martin Dodt (1887–1819) was a naval officer. On 24 November 1701 he was married to Cathrine Stibolt. He was stationed at the guardship in Helsingør. In 1799, he also served as interim enrollment officer in the city.

=== 19th century ===
The property was later acquired by merchant Christian Frederik Eckardt (1771–1837). The corner building (Sophie Brahes Gade wing) was constructed for him in 1827–30. Christian Frederik Eckardt was married to Marie Vilhelmine Johnsen (1790–1860). They were the parents of landowner and politician Christian Frederik Eckhardt and actor Lauritz Echardt.

Eckhardt is also remembered for establishing Den Eckhardtske Stiftelse in Bjergegade.

=== 20th century ===
In 1899 the building was expanded by master mason P.A. Faarup. The adjacent building in Stengade was heightened with one storey in 1900. The sailmaker (as well as flagmaker and compass maker) Niels Johan Petersen (1855-) owned the property from 1900 to 1915.
