= Rytterhuset =

Danish historic house

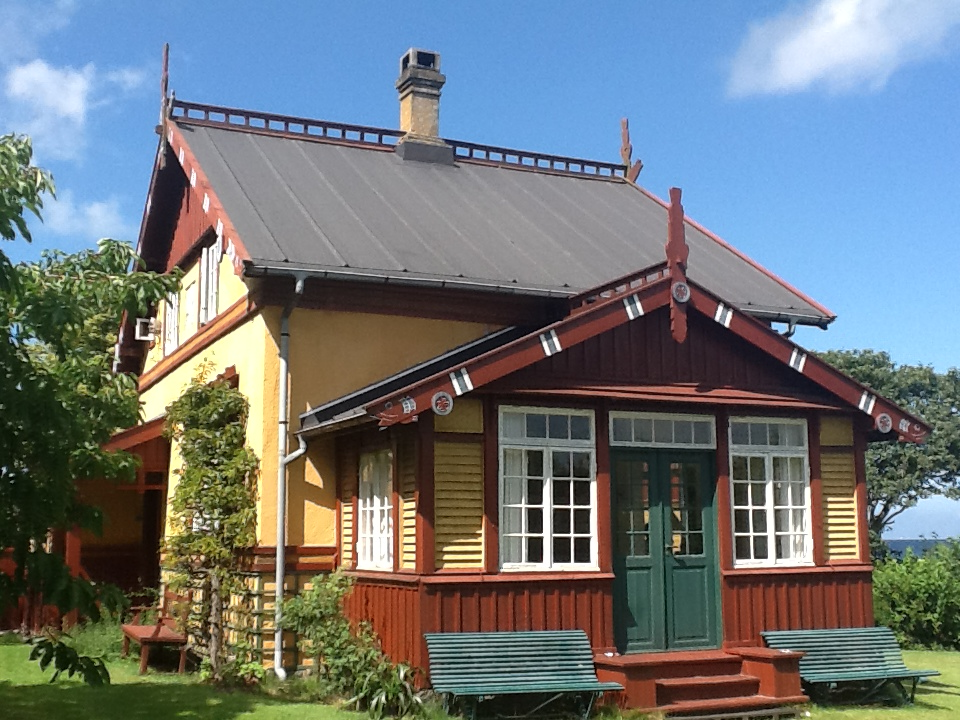
- Interactive map of the Rytterhuset area

General information
- Location: Ålsgårde, Denmark
- Coordinates: 56°4′56.57″N 12°31′44.76″E
- Completed: 1889
- Client: Frants Henningsen

Design and construction
- Architect: Martin Nyrop

Rytterhuset (lit. "The Rider's House"), located at Nordre Strandvej 230, Ålsgårde, Helsingør Municipality, Denmarkm was built in 1889 to a national romantic design by Martin Nyrop as summer residence for the painter Frants Henningsen. The property, including a detached atelier, a jetty with a bathhouse and a number of other outbuildings, were listed in the Danish registry of protected buildings and places in 1993. The ample use of wood ornamentation and polychromy are both tell-tale features of this particular architectural style. The name of the building was inspired by a relief of a horseman located above the main entrance.

Barbicaia at Nordre Strandvej 232 dates from the same year and was also designed by Nyrop but has undergone considerable alterations and is therefore not listed.

== History ==
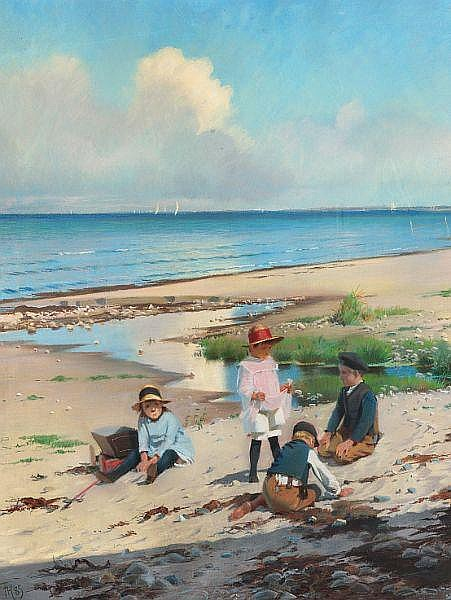
Frants Henningsen: Summer day on the beach at Hornbæk with children playing.

Frants Henningsen and his friends P. S: Krøyer, Viggo Johansen and Kristian Zahrtmann visited Hornbæk in 1873. They were later coined by other artists, including Holger Drachmann and Carl Locher, forming what would become Denmark's first artist colony.

Nordre Strandvej was constructed in 1874–1879 as a more direct link between Helsingør and Hellebæk than Hammermøllevej (now Gammel Gellebækvej). The fashionable Hotel Marienlyst was located at the beginning of the new road and many of the first buildings along it were summer retreats for wealthy citizens from Copenhagen or Helsingør.

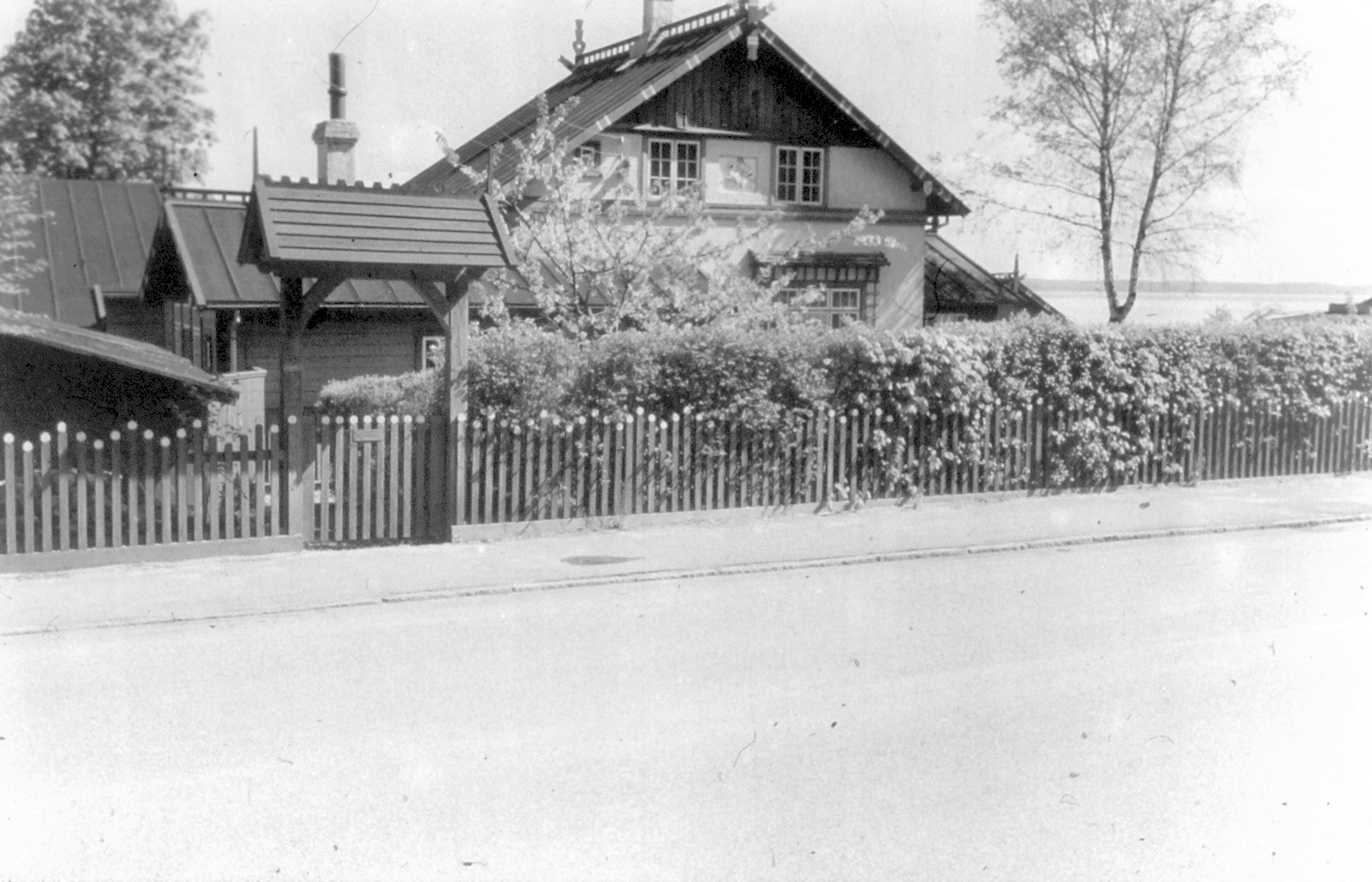
Rytterhuset viewed from the road

Henningsen did not follow Krøyer, Johansen and most of the other Hornbæk artists when they moved to Skagen in the early 1880s. In 1889, he commissioned Martin Nyrop to design a summer house for him and his family in Ålsgårde.

Henningsen's wife Thora was a daughter of the painter Frederik Vermehren. They had five children, including Thorkild Henningsen. The family lived in an apartment on the second floor at Østerbrogade 46 in Copenhagen when Rytterhuset was completed but moved to an apartment in the Behagen House on Strandgade the following year.

== Architecture ==
The two-storey house is constructed in yellow-washed brick contrasted by a wealth of carved wooden details painted in Swedish red and other strong colours. The red-painted bargeboards are decorated with blue- and white-painted carved animal heads. Above the covered main entrance in the south gable is a relief of a horseman. An outbuilding with kitchen and washroom projects from the west side of the building. and on its east side is a veranda.

Nyrop, who had a background as a carpenter, had just experienced his breakthrough as an architect with his design of the buildings for the 1888 Nordic Exhibition in Copenhagen. He constructed all his exhibition pavilions of wood at a time when iron and glass was favored for temporary structures, justifying the decision by claiming the result would be prettier for the same cost. Both Rytterhuset and many of his buildings for the Nordic Exhibition (cf. Det Norske Hus) were inspired by Nordic Vernacular architecture, wood ornamentation and polychromy which mirror the National romantic currents in architecture at the time.

Other buildings include a shed for firewood, an annex building, a garden pavilion. an atelier, a garage and a jetty with a bathhouse.

== See also ==
- Munkeruphus
- Rågegården
