= Tibberup Windmill =

Windmill in Helsingør, Denmark

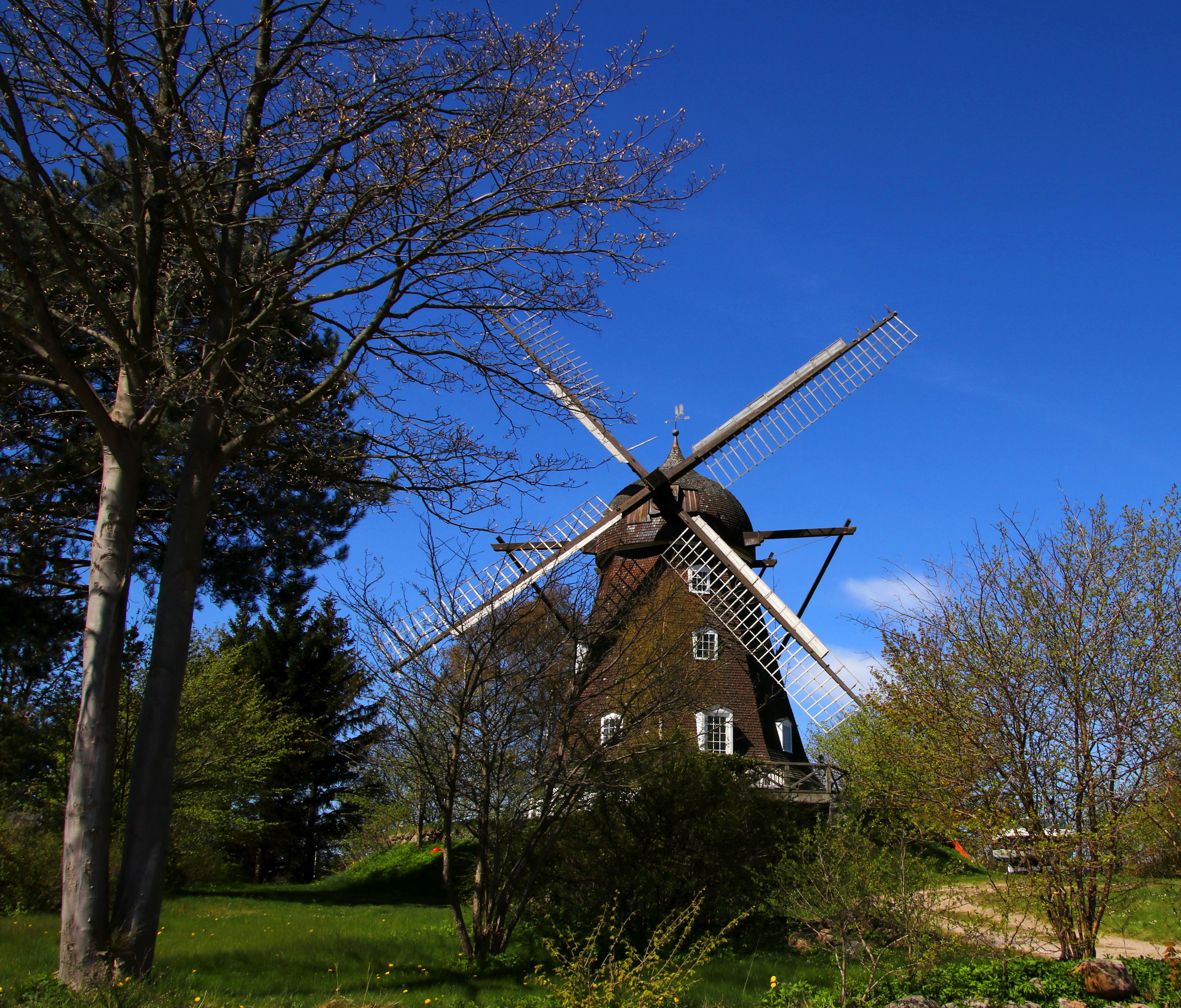
- Interactive map of Tibberup Windmill

Origin
- Mill name: Tibberup Windmill
- Mill location: Tibberup. Helsingør, Denmark
- Coordinates: 55.984987°N 12.552032°E
- Year built: 1870

Information
- Purpose: Corn mill
- Type: Smock mill
- Storeys: Three storey smock
- Base storeys: Single storey base
- Smock sides: Eight sides
- No. of sails: Four sails

Tibberup Windmill (Danish: Tibberup Mølle) is a smock mill perched on a small hill in Tibberup in the southern part of Helsingør, Denmark. Built in 1870, it remained in service until 1816.

== History ==
=== The first windmills at the site ===
Tibberup Stub Mill painted by Vilhelm Petersen in 1854

Documents show that the owner of Krogerup constructed a stub mill on Tibberup Hill in 1697 as a replacement for an older watermill located at Søbækhuset in Espergærde. It is not known whether it was the first windmill built at the site. The windmill disappeared after a few years when a Swedish army led by Carl XII of Sweden landed on the Øresund coast at Tibberup in August 1700. They established a fortified camp on the hill where remains of their defensive structures can still be seen today. The camp contained up to 15,000 soldiers and continued all the way to Babyloneskoven at Humlebæk. A new stub mill was built at the site after a few years. It was sold by the owner of Krogerup in 1806. This stub mill was torn down in 1868.

=== The currentwindmill ===
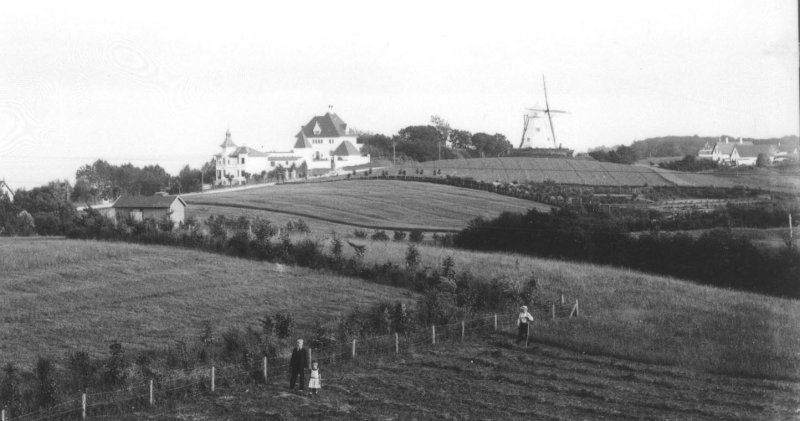
Tibberup Windmill in 1905

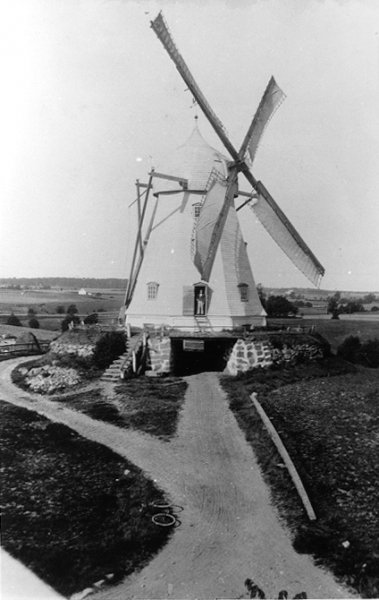
Tibberup Windmill (ca. 1900)

The current smock mill was built at the site in 1869–70 by the timber Niels Andersen from Skotterup for the miller Niels Christiansen. ´He was third generation of millers at the site. The mill was decommissioned in 1916. It was listed in 1950. The mill was converted into a residence by the artists Grethe and Karl Szabad in 1954. They also used it as studio and for exhibitions. The couple sold the windmill to Helsingør Municipality in 1975 but continued to live there until 1993. In 2006, Helsingør Municipality sold the windmill to a private buyer.

== Description ==
The octagonal windmill consists of a three-storey tower standing on a field stone-and-brick case and topped by an ogee cap. Both tower can cap are covered in shingles. The cap carries the four sails. The only part of the machinery that has survived is the upright shaft.

== Today ==
Tibberup Windmill is today owned by Heidi Busch Nielsen and Søren Anker Nielsen.

== See also ==
- List of windmills in Denmark
