= Kirck House =

Listed building in Helsingør, Denmark

- Kircks Gprd
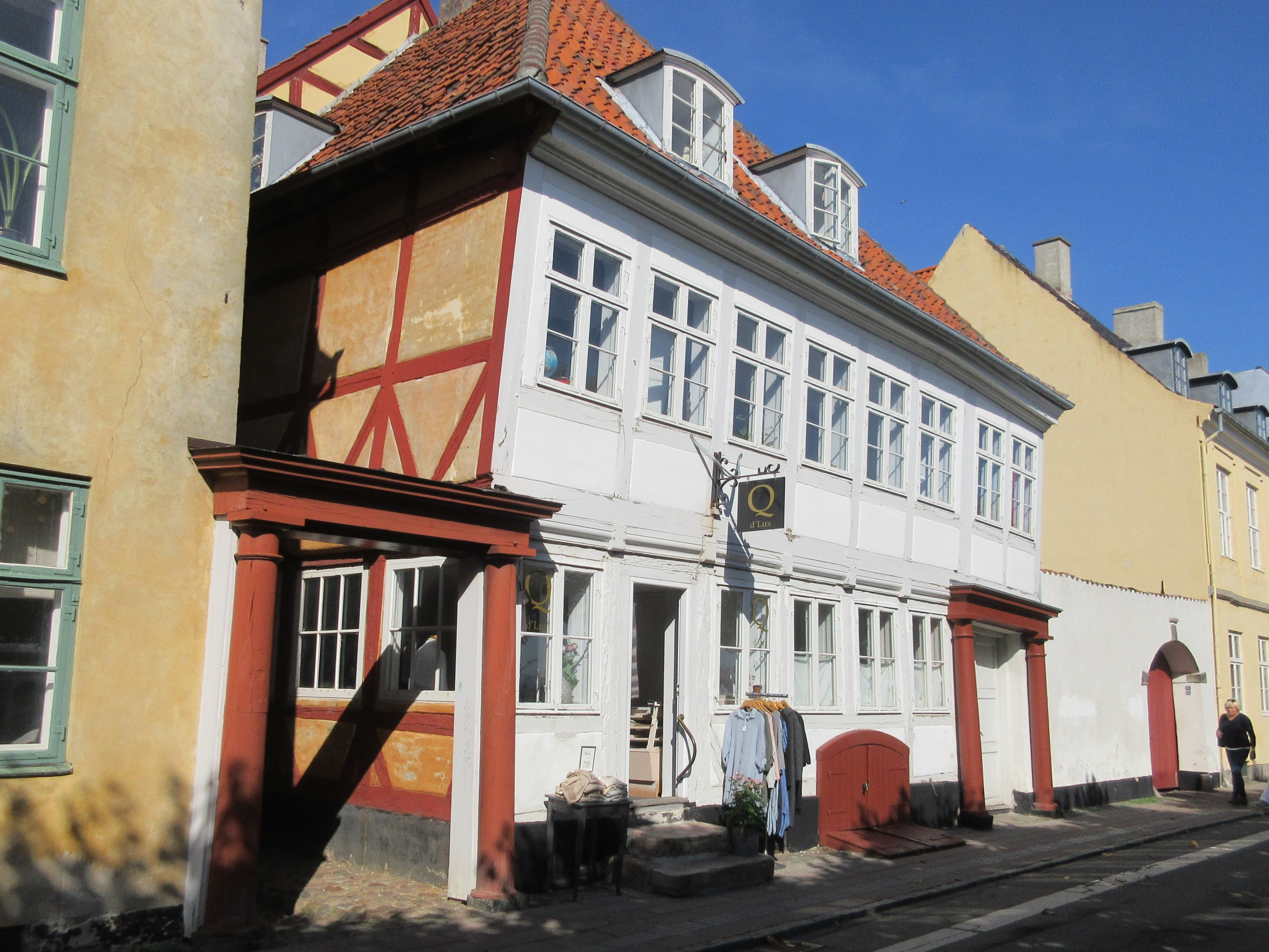
- Interactive map of the Kirck House area

General information
- Location: Helsingøt, Strandgade 81–83, 3000 Helsingør, Denmark
- Coordinates: 56°2′4.34″N 12°36′52.02″E
- Construction started: 1761 and later (front wing); 1642 (warehouse)

The Kirck House (Danish: Kircks Gård) is a historic property situated at Strandgade 81–83 in Helsingør, Denmark. The half-timbered front main wing dates from the second half of the 18th century. A detached, T-shaped complex of former warehouses is located in the courtyard. The two buildings were listed in the Danish registry of protected buildings and places in 1919.

== History ==
=== Origins ===
Back in the 17th century, the properties along the southern side of Stengade continued all the way down to the beach (where Strandgade runs today). A five-bay-long, half-timbered building faced the beach (1579).

The long marrow property was later divided into two separate properties. The property on Strandgade belonged to Willum Fahrenhausen in 1687. It was later acquired by Eilert Tschjerning.

=== 18th century ===
In 1713, Eilert Tschjerning sold the property to Rolluf Rolufsen. Rolufsen was from the Netherlands. He ran a tavern called Amsterdam from the premises. The establishment catered to Helsingør's Dutch community as well as the many Dutch sailors who visited the city in conjunction with the payment of Sound Dues.Rollufsen's widow was a co-owner of the building until 1759.

The wine merchant Andreas Küster owned the building from c. 1760. In 1761, he expanded the building westwards with three bays. The property changed hands again in 1782 when it was acquired by merchant Johan Ulrich Schiønning. He constructed a new side wing along Gammel Færgestræde.

=== 19th century ===
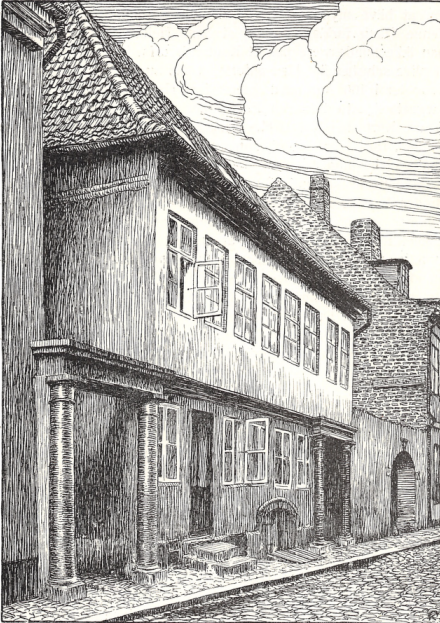
The Kirck House by Kristian Kongstad.

In 1801, Johan Fredrrik Lunde and Carl Ludvig Soldan bought the building. In 1817, it was acquired by Charles Fenwick and Partners. Two years later, they converted the ground floor into a retail space.

A just 21-year-old Niels Peter Kirck bought the property in 1823. In 1827, he took cotozenship as a ship's agent (skibsklarerer ) and commissioner (handelskommissær).He collaborated with his brother-in-law Andreas Wachtelbrenner. In 1844, Kirck constructed a new warehouse in the courtyard. In 1854, he also bought an existing warehouse from 1642 (until then part of Stengade 70).

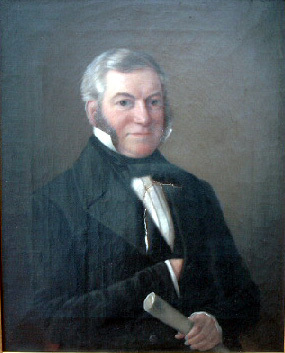
N. P. Kirck, 1854.

In 1844, Kirck constructed a four-storey warehouse in the courtyard. He unsuccessfully tried to buy an adjacent warehouse from Johannes van Mehren, whi owned Stengade 70 on the other side of the block. In 1854, some time after Johannes van Mehren's death, Kirck finally managed to buy the entire property from his son August Ferdinand Mehren. The price was 1m600 Danish rigsdaler, The two warehouses were subsequently merged into a large, T_shaped complex.

Kirck was married to Petra Kirck. Sje continued the firm after her husband's death. It was later passed to their son Vigo Kirck.

== Architecture ==
Strandgade is an eight-bay-long, two-storey, half-timbered building. The front side of the building is white-washed. The gables and rear side are finished with red-painted timber framing and plastered, yellow-pained infills.
