= Spæth House =

- Spæths Gård
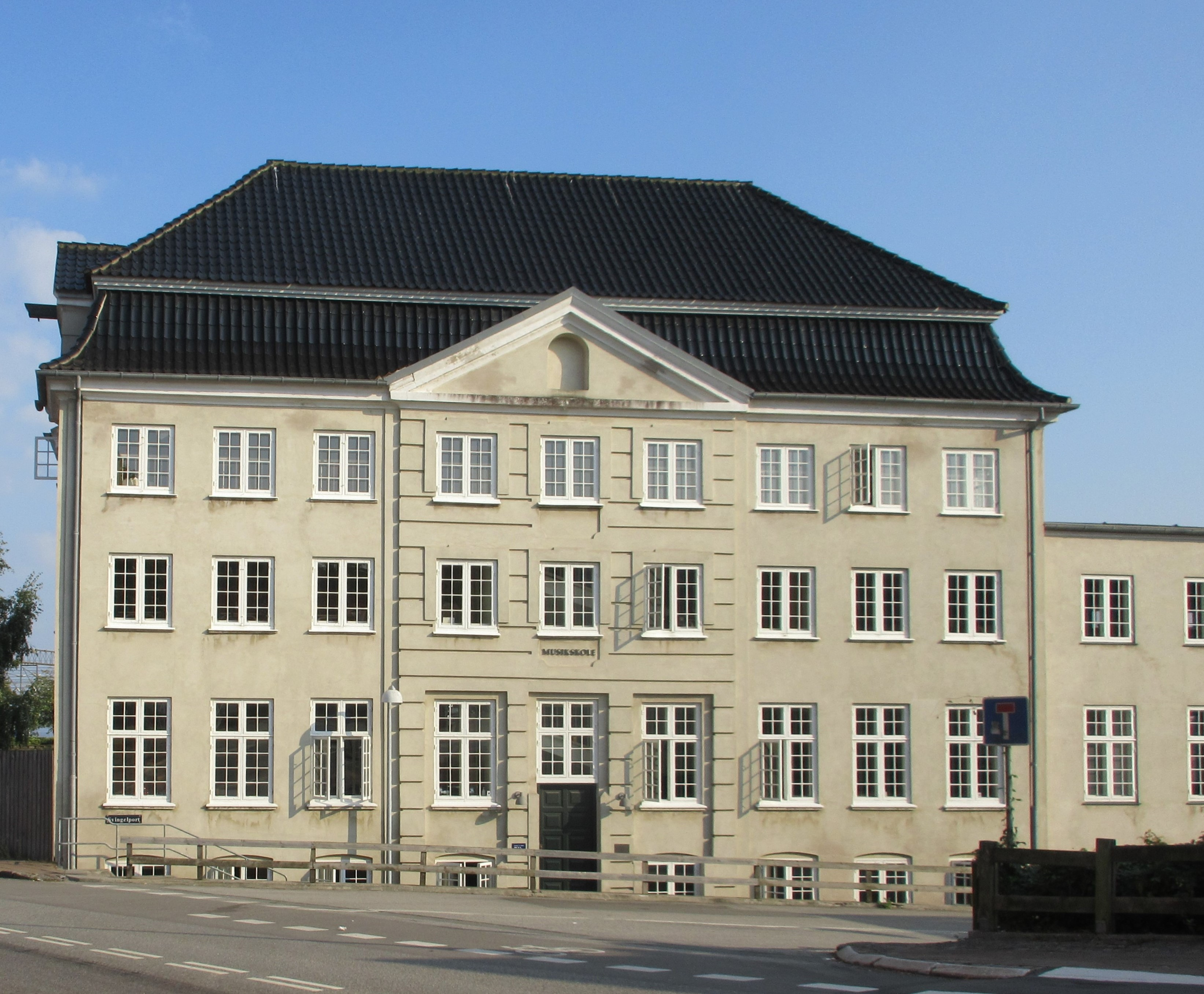
- Interactive map of the Spæth House area

General information
- Location: Helsingør, Denmark
- Coordinates: 56°1′53.51″N 12°36′31.29″E
- Construction started: 1765
- Completed: 1770
- Client: Johan Adam Spæth
- Owner: Helsingør Municipality

The Spæth House is a Rococo-style mansion in Helsingør, Denmark. Built for Johan Adam Spæth, who established Helsingør's first sugar refinery, it served as both a residence and a warehouse. The building is listed, owned by the Helsingør Municipality, and houses a music school.

== History ==
The building takes its name after Johan Adam Spæth, a native of Zerbst who moved to Helsingør at the age of 28. After working as an innkeeper and wine trader, he began to trade with ships that stopped in Copenhagen to pay Sound Dues. In 1744, he and seven others founded a Helsingør merchant's guild; Spæth was its alderman from 1754 to 1762. In 1761, Spæth obtained a royal license to open Helsingør's first sugar refinery at a site next to the coast road just south of Helsingør's Svingel Gate. Construction of the house began in 1765. Designed as both a residence and warehouse, it was associated with the refinery. A lower extension was added to the southwest gable in 1932. The building was used by the Civil Defence Agency late in the twentieth century and was converted into a public music school in 1999, which is owned by Helsingør Municipality.

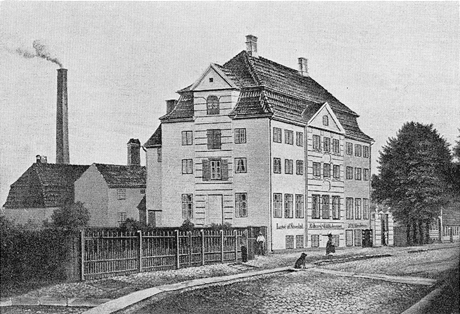
The Späth House in c. 1865-

== Architecture ==
The Rococo-style mansion is three storeys high and has a mansard roof covered with black-glazed tiles. It is nine bays long and three bays deep. The façade has a three-bay central projection crowned by a triangular pediment containing a round-arched niche. A one-bay projection on the gable rises into a wall dormer fitted with a projecting hoist beam.
