= Adolph Sigfried von der Osten =

Danish diplomat

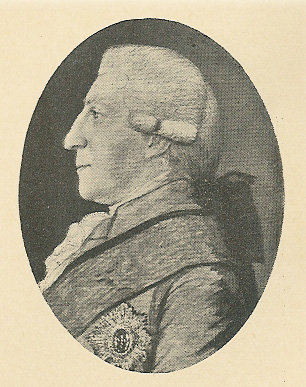
Greve Adolph Sigfried von der Osten

Count Adolph Sigfried von der Osten (21 October 1726, Denmark – 2 January 1797) was a Danish diplomat of German descent. His father was Jacob Frants von der Osten (died 1739), whose family was Pomeranian. Adolph was born in Denmark and liked to display Danish national sentiment. Christian VI of Denmark paid for him to study and travel abroad, and he was cared for by Carl Adolph von Plessen when young. In 1783, he was made a knight of the Order of the Elephant.
