= Helsingør Custom House =

Building in Helsingør Municipality, Denmark

- Toldkammeret
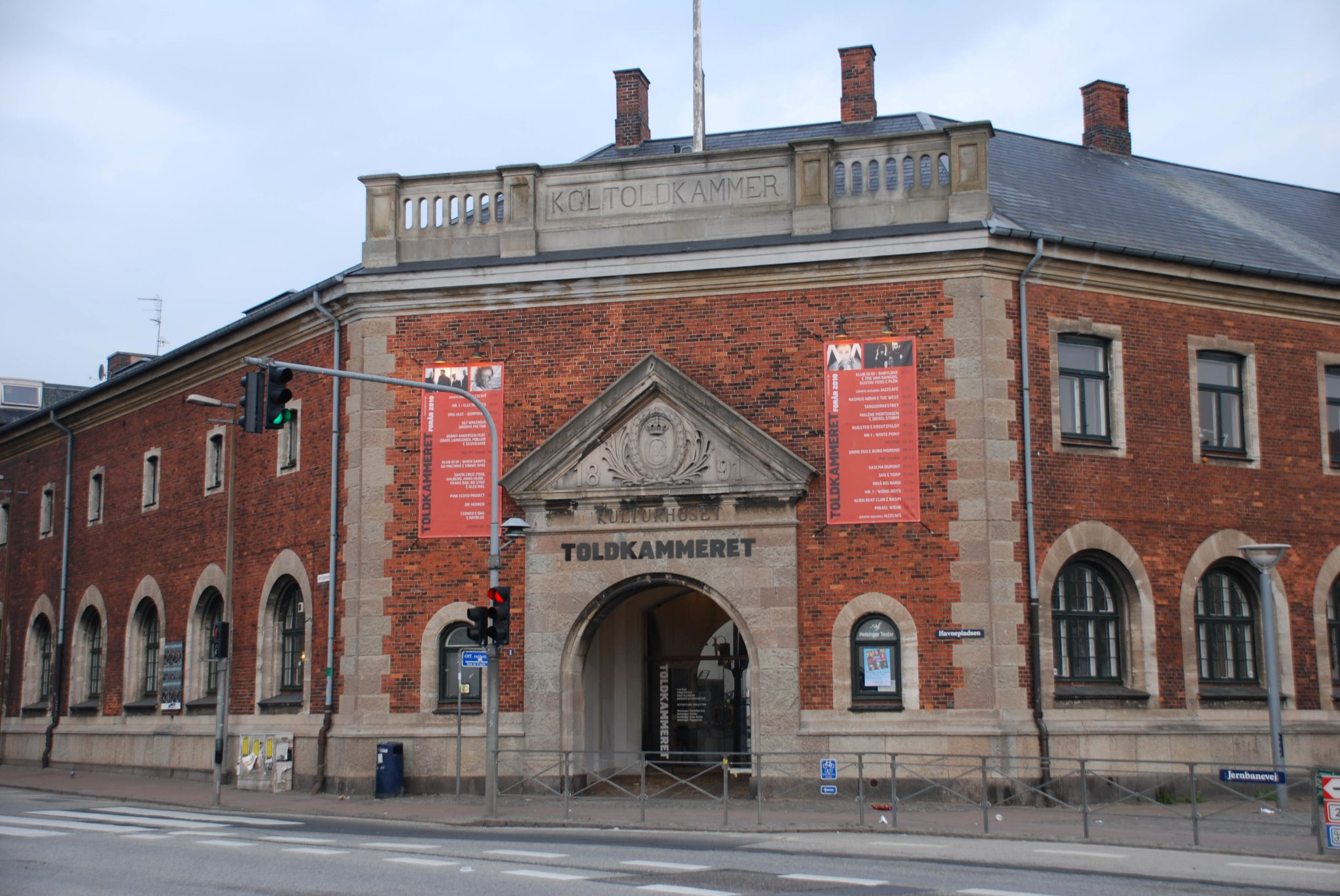
- The main entrance on Havnepladsen
- Interactive map of the Helsingør Custom House area

General information
- Architectural style: Historicist
- Location: Helsingør, Denmark
- Coordinates: 56°2′3″N 12°36′50.32″E
- Construction started: 1887
- Inaugurated: 16 November 1891
- Client: Danish state
- Owner: Kulturværftet

Design and construction
- Architect: Johan Daniel Herholdt

Helsingør Custom House (Danish: Helsingør Toldkammer) is a former custom house situated next to Helsingør station in central Helsingør, Denmark. Completed in 1891 to a Historicist design by Johan Daniel Herholdt, it replaced Øresund Custom House, which had played a central role in Denmark's collection of Sound Dues before it was demolished in connection with an expansion of the harbour in the 1860s. The new custom house remained in use until 1976 and is today part of the Kulturværftet, a nearby cultural centre, hosting smaller concerts, exhibitions and other events.

== History ==
=== Øresund Custom House ===
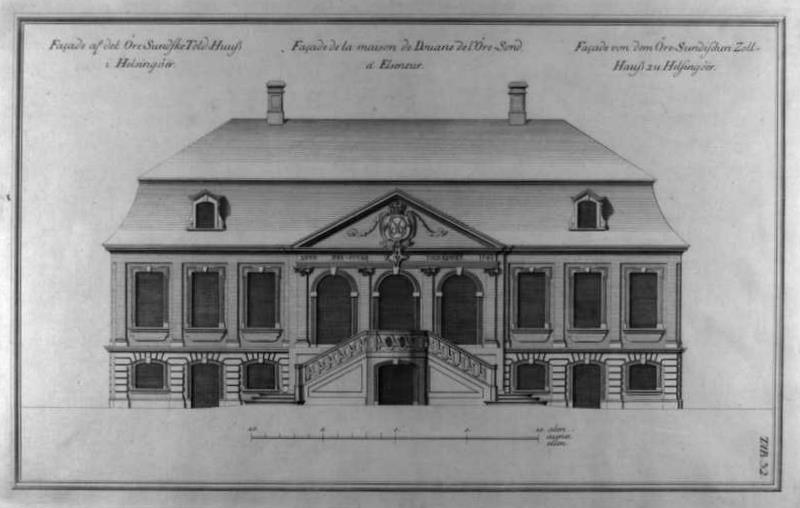
Øresund Custom House, illustration from Lauritz de Thurah's Den Danske Vitruvius

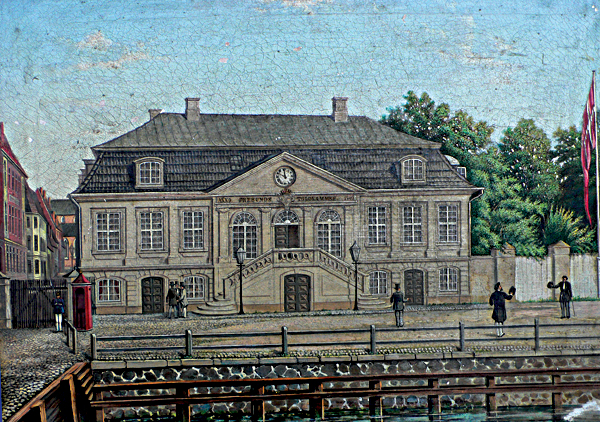
Øresund Custom House

The first custom house in Helsingør was called Øresund Custom House, reflecting its role in the collection of Sound Dues from all ships that passed through the Øresund.

In 1681, the custom house moved to a Late Medieval building on Strandgade which was acquired from a bookkeeper named Claus Liime. In 1737–1739, Niels Eigtved, Lauritz de Thurah and Philip de Lange—three of Denmark's most significant architects of the time—all created design proposals for a new custom house. In the end, none of their designs were used when a new custom house was built on the corner of Sophie Brahes Gade and Strandgade in 1740–1742. The building was instead designed by the otherwise unknown architect N in a mixture of Baroque and Rococo style. It measured approximately 25 by 11 metres and was topped by a Mansard roof. The central three-bay projection was topped by a triangular pediment with Christian VI's gilded monogram. The relief and the building's other sandstone decorations were executed by Jacob Fortling. Below the triangular pediment was an architrave and frieze with the inscription Øresunds Toldkammer Anno 1740 ("Øresund's Custom House Anno 1740"). The building contained a large central hall flanked by offices on each side.

On the corner of Sophie Brahes Gade and Stengade, to the rear of the Custom House, its director, Wilhelm August von der Osten, constructed a private residence. The house was in 1774 sold to the Custom Authority and used as official residence for its directors. A 55-metre-long (180 ft) wing on Sofie Brahe Gade contained stables, servants quarters and a gate. In 1830–31, Øresund Custom House was expanded with two new wings as a result of the increasing number of ships that passed through the Øresund. A clock face replaced Christian VI's monogram above the entrance in the main wing.

=== The current custom house ===
Following the abolition of the Sound Dues in 1867, it was decided to expand Helsingør's docklands to create room for ship repair as well as a coal station for the passing steam vessels. The custom house was pulled down in 1859 and the director's house in 1862.

Royal Building Inspector Johan Daniel Herholdt was charged with the design of a new building which was inaugurated on 16 November 1891. The custom house remained in use until 1976. In 1989, Kulturhuset Toldkammeret, a self-owning cultural venue, opened at the site.

== Architecture ==
The building, which occupies an entire block, is designed in the Historicist style which is typical of Harholdt as well as of Danish architecture in the late 19th century. The three-winged complex surrounds a cobbled courtyard which is closed on Strandgade by a two-metre-tall (6.6 ft) wall.

== Directors ==
- 1664–1668 Marcus Meibom
- 1738–1764 Wilhelm August von der Osten
- 1764–1766 Niels Krabbe Vind
- 1766–1770 Johann Hartwig Ernst von Bernstorff
- 1770–1772Adolph Sigfried von der Osten
- 1772–1772 Jørgen Erik Skeel
- 1772–1776 Joachim Godske Moltke
- 1776–1811 Christian Numsen
- 1811–18?? Frederik Moltke
- 1833–1839 Adam Gottlob von Krogh
- 1839–1850 Nicolai Abraham Holten
- 1850–1857 Christian Albrecht Bluhme

== See also ==
- Skibsklarerergaarden
- Classen Mansion (Helsingør)
