= Ved Stranden 16 =

Historical building in Copenhagen, Denmark

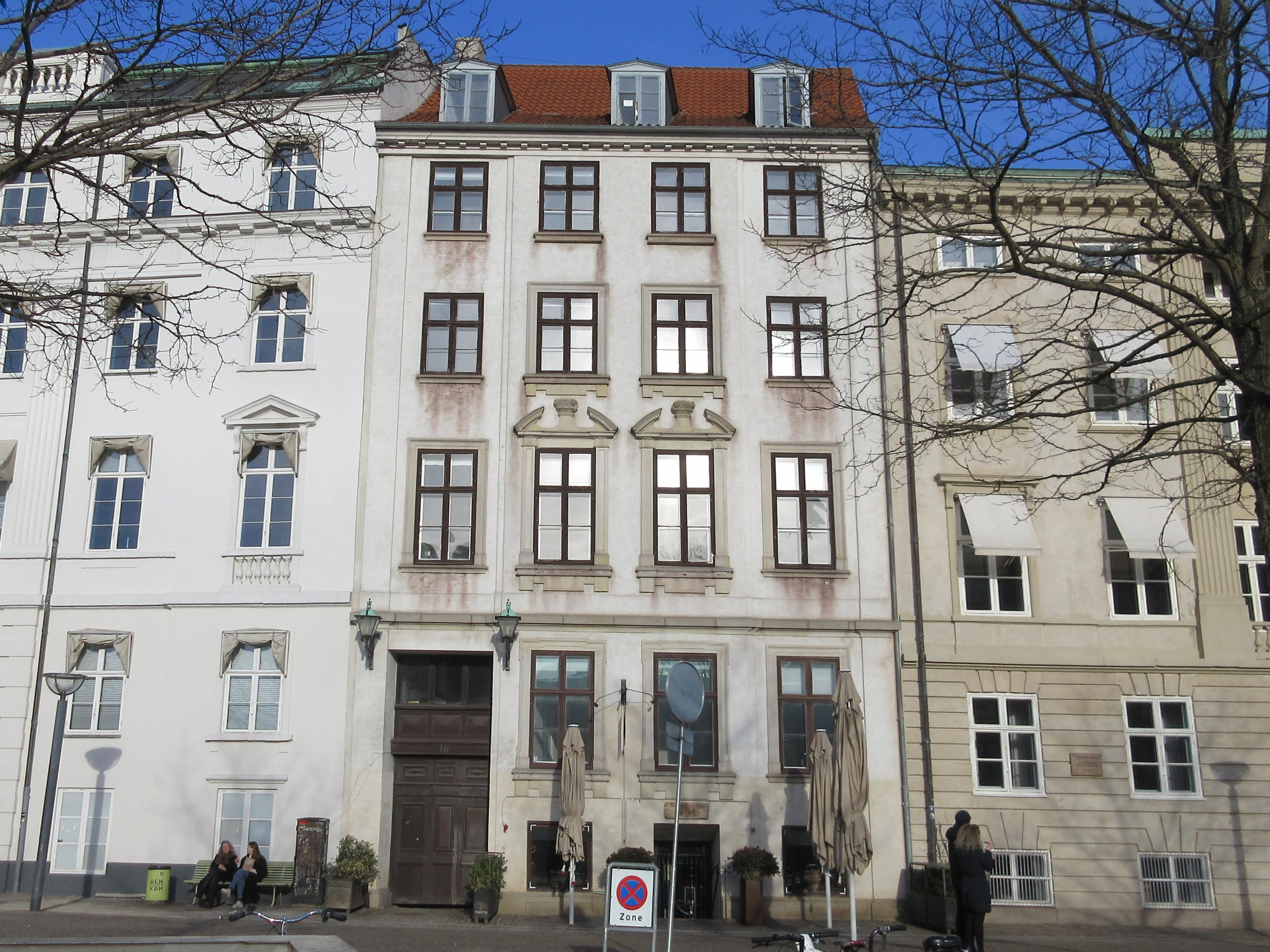
- Interactive map of the Ved Stranden 16 area

General information
- Location: Copenhagen, Denmark
- Coordinates: 55°40′39.4″N 12°34′52.25″E
- Completed: 1749
- Client: Stephen Hansen

Design and construction
- Architect: Philip de Lange

Ved Stranden 16 is a narrow, mid18th-century property]] located opposite Christiansborg Palace in central Copenhagen, Denmark. The building was listed on the Danish registry of protected buildings and places in 1918. It is flanked by the former Hotel Royal to the left and the Gustmeyer House to the right.

== History ==
=== 18th century ===
The site was in 1689 as No. 219 owned by kancelliforvalter Rasmus Rasmussen. The building was together with most of the other buildings in the area destroyed in the Copenhagen Fire of 1728. The property was later acquired by General War Commissioner Stephen Hansen. He commissioned Philip de Lange to construct a new building in 1748. Philip de Lange, whom he knew from the Royal Copenhagen Shooting Society, had most likely already built a new main building at Hellebækgård for him. Hansen had also acquired the adjacent No. 205 in Admiralgade on the other side of the block. Hansen resigned from the military in 1750 to focus on his career as an industrialist and merchant in Helsingør where de Lange constructed the Stephen Hansen Mansion for him in 1754, In 1756, he still owned the two properties in Copenhagen which as of 1755 were known as No. 250 (formerly No. 213) and No. 241 (formerly No. 205).

=== Valentin Madsen ===
The two properties were later acquired by Valentin Madsen. He established a sugar refinery on the site. Madsen resided in the building with his wife Maren Jens Datter and their six children (aged six to 17) at the time of the 1787 census. The other residents were a floor clerk, a seamstress, a female cook a maid, a caretaker and four workers at the sugar refinery.

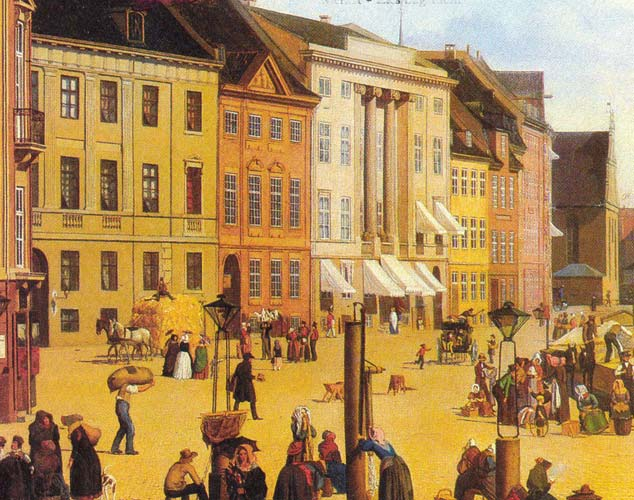
The house seen on a painting by Sally Henriques

Madsen's building was one of few buildings in the area that survived the Copenhagen Fire of 1795. After the fire, he also purchased the property No. 242 in Admiralgade.

His property was home to a total of 19 residents at the 1801 census. Madsen and his wife lived there with four children.

Madsen's three properties were jointly listed in the new cadastre of 1806 as No. 253 in Eastern Quarter.

Valentin Madsen's daughter Dorothea Marie Madsen was married to the clergy Christian Madsen. Their daughter Vilhelmine Bech (1803-1853) married on 21 December 1823 to the physician and medical historian Frederik Vilhelm Mansa.

=== 1840 census ===
The property No. 153 was home to a total of 17 residents at the 1840 census. The just 19-year-old Peter Mac Evay resided alone on the first floor. Jürgen Friederich Garven, the manager of a sugar house, resided with his wife Maria Cathrina Garven, their three children (aged 11 to 20) and a maid on the second floor.iederich Garven Iwer Valentin Christian Dresler, a 29-year-old employee in a trading firm (handelsbetjent), resided alone on the ground floor.

=== Harboe and the 1845 make-over ===
The property was in the first half of the 1840s owned by a merchant named Harboe. He heightened the building in Ved Stranden in 1844 and constructed a new building towards Admiralgade. In 1845, he divided the property into two properties, No. 153A in Ved Stranden and No. 153B In Admiralgade. With the introduction of house numbering by street in 1859 (as opposed to the old cadastral numbers by quarter), No. 153A became known as Ved Stranden 16. The property at Ved Stranden 16 was in the middle of the 19th century owned by a wholesale merchant named Harboe.

=== 1850 census ===
No. 153 A was home to a total of 22 residents at the 1850 census. Herman Feincke Stahl, a textile manufacturer, resided with his wife, daughter, sister-in-law, niece and a maid on the ground floor.Poul Eduard Moritz Löbel, a hotelier, resided with his wife and three servants on the first floor. Frederick August Baggesen, an army colonel, resided on the third floor with his wife, four children and one maid.

=== 20th century ===
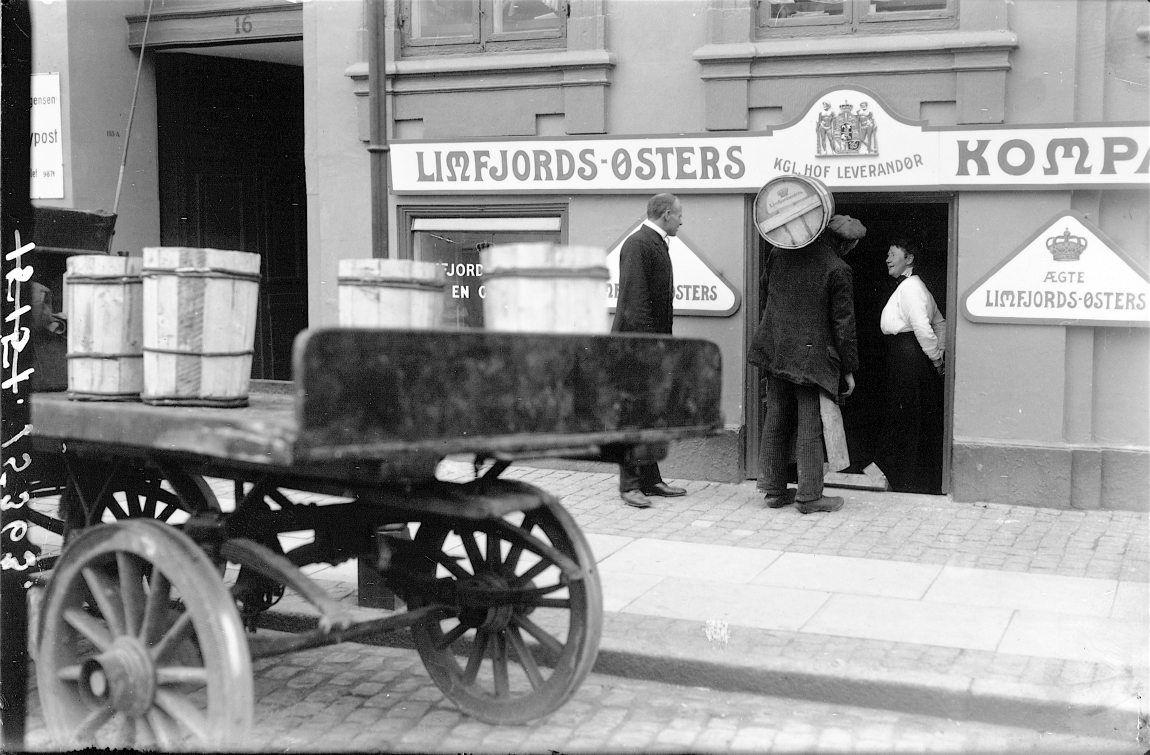
Limfjordskompagniet's outlet photographed by Peter Elfelt in 1917

Limfjordskompagniet, a manufacturer of shellfish from Mors, opened an outlet in the basement in the 1910s.

Kraks Fond, which had until then been based in the Krak House on Nytorv, was a tenant in the building from 1898. It is now based in Fæstningens Materialgård.

== Architecture ==
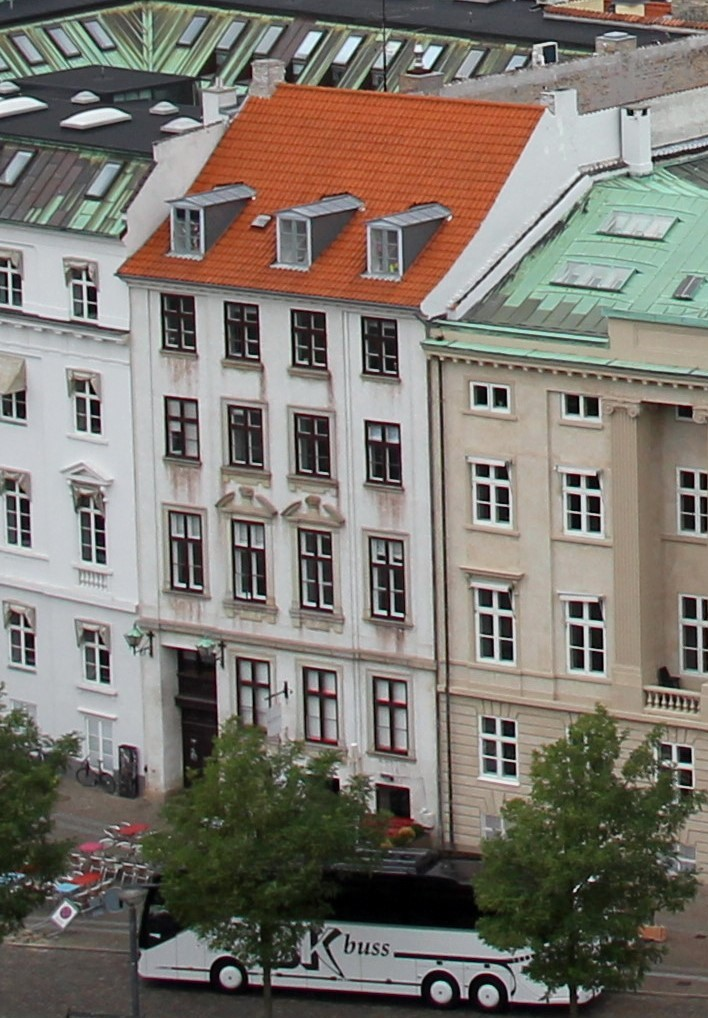
The building viewed from the tower of Christiansborg Palace.

Philip de Lange's original building consisted of three floors over a high cellar and the facade was crowned by a pediment. The building was heightened with one floor for Harboe in 1844–46. The building is four bays wide of which the two outer bays are slightly recessed. The windows are brown painted and the two central windows on the three lower floors are framed in sandstone. The two central windows on the bel étage are topped by open pediments with reliefs of fruit baskets. A cornice supported by corbels line the top of the building. The roof is clad with red tile and features three dormer windows.

A gateway flanked by two lanterns is located in the left hand side of the ground floor (north) while a short flight of stairs in the second bay from the right leads down to the basement. The gateway opens to a narrow courtyard. A doorway in the south wall of the gateway affords access to the main staircase of the building.

Two consecutive side wings project from the rear side of the building. The first one is six bays long and dates from 1795. The second one is four bays long and dates from1705. Both of them were originally three storeys high but were heightened together with the front wing in 1844.

== Today ==
The ground floor is home to a cava bar. Rud Pedersen, a public affairs agency, is based on the second floor. The third floor is occupied by PayGap, a Pay Transparency technology company, and Nordic Reward Partners, a Total Rewards consultancy.
