= Philip de Lange House =

Building in Copenhagen, Denmark

- Philip de Langes Hus
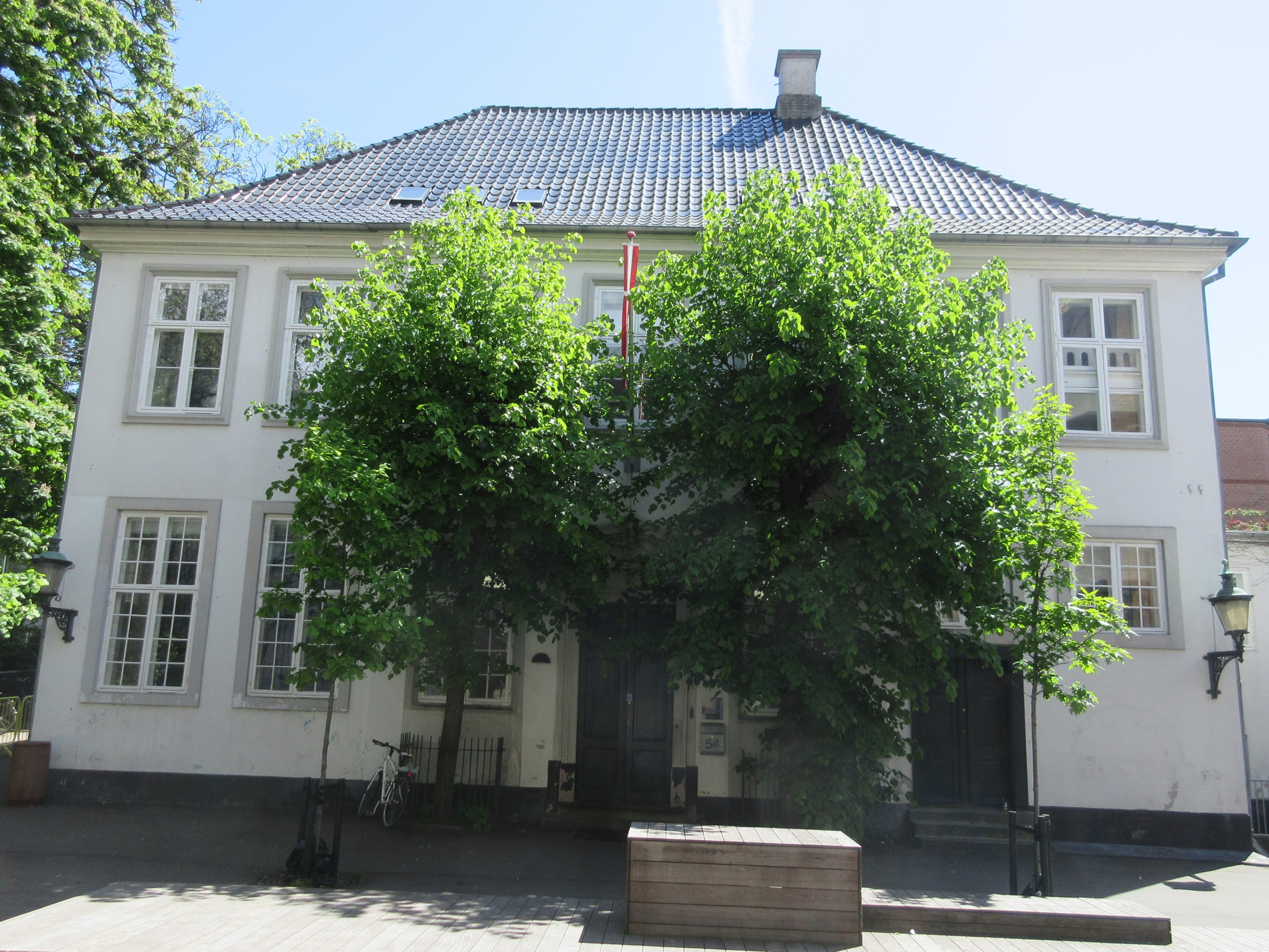
- Interactive map of the Philip de Lange House area

General information
- Location: Copenhagen, Denmark
- Coordinates: 55°40′21.72″N 12°35′42.32″E
- Completed: 1755
- Client: Hinrich Ladiges

The Philip de Lange House, built in association with a nitrary in the 1750s, is the Rococo-style former home of Dutch-Danish architect and master builder Philip de Lange at Prinsessegade 54 in the Christianshavn neighborhood of Copenhagen, Denmark. It was from 1877 to 1864 part of the Royal Porcelain Manufactory's Christianshavn factory and is now hidden from the street by a school building from 1865. The house was listed on the Danish registry of protected buildings and places in 1932. It is now part of Christianshavn School and houses the school's after school programmes.

== History ==
=== Philip de Lange's house and nitrary ===
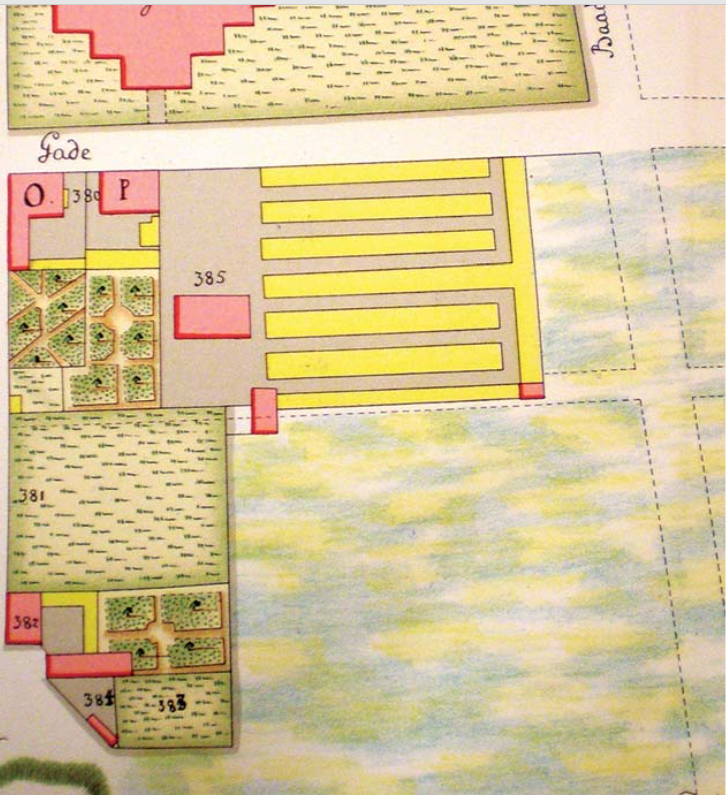
Detail from Gedde's district map of Christianshavn (1757): The Philip de Lange House is seen under the lot number (385) and the long niter beds are seen to the right.

Philip de Lange purchased a large site at Prinsessegade in 1755 and was at the same time granted a royal license to establish a nitrary in the grounds. A house for his own use was completed on the property later that same year. His second son, Philip Lange, who would himself become a prominent architect and master builder, was born the following year.

Niter was together with charcoal and sulphor from Iceland (then part of Denmark) the main ingredients in the manufacture of gunpowder. The niter was extracted from enriched soil in shallow, rectangular niter beds which was fed with nitrate-rich materials such as urin, dead animals, blood and soil from stables. Lange closed the nitrary after a few years but lived in the house until his death in 1766. His widow Lucia sold the house in 1777.

=== Cotton, porcelain and tobacco ===
The new owner, Arnold Piccardi, a textile manufacturer, established a cotton factory with 12 loomss in the building, but it was no success and soon had to close.

Piccardi sold the property to the owners of the city's new porcelain factory in 1778. The porcelain factory was in 1780 taken over by the Crown and from then on known as the Royal Porcelain Manufactory (Den Kongelige Porcelænsfabrik, now Royal Copenhagen). The scientist Georg Forchhammer, who headed the porcelain factory's dye laboratory, resided in the building from 1825 to 1829.

Part of the Royal Porcelain Factory's property (now Prinsessegade 60) was in 1855 sold to the E. Nobel tobacco company. Another portion (now Prinsessegade 62) was in 1862 sold to Aluminia. In 1868, E. Nobel acquired Aluminia's factory in exchange for its factory in Frederiksberg.

=== Prinsessegade School ===
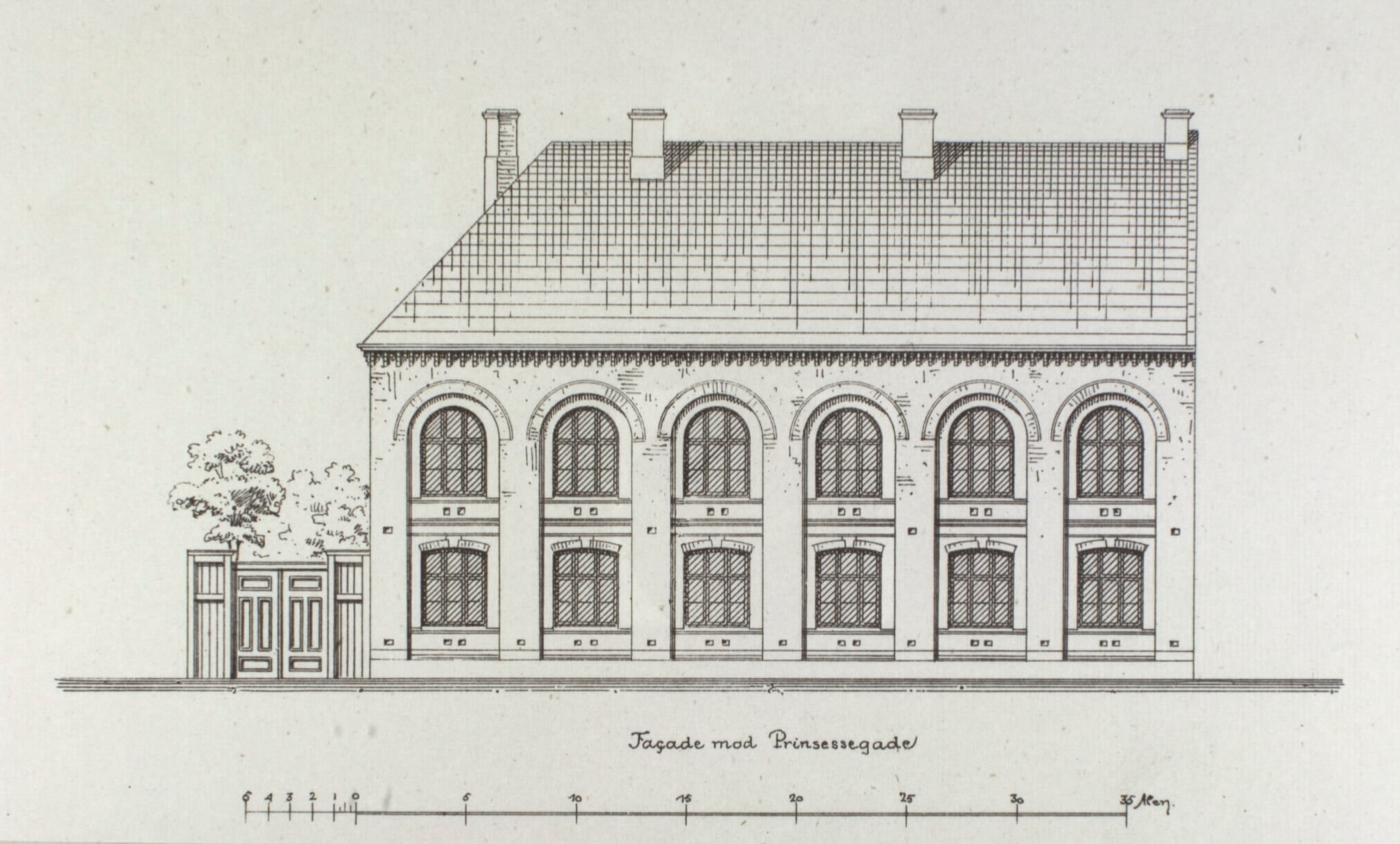
Drawing of Prinsessegades Betalingsskole, the building that now hides the Philip de Lange House from the street

The southeastern part of the property, with the Philip de Lange House, was in October 1864 sold to Prinsessegades Betalinghsskole. The building that now hides the Philip de Lange House from the street was constructed in 1865.

The Philip de Lange House was in the 1850s taken over by Christianshavn School. A new school building was constructed towards the street and the old house was also used by the school. The ground floor was used for gymnastics.

On 1 April 1915, Prinsessegades Betalingsskole was converted into a public boys' school while Bådmandsgade School was converted into a public girls' school. In 1938, Prinsessegade School was merged with Droningensgade School under the name Christianshavn School. In 1949 the city purchased the former naval hospital at Prinsessegade 45 as a new main campus for the school. The Prinsessegade complex remained part of the school while the building in Droningensgade was ceded to Kofoed's School.

== Architecture ==
The house is seven bays wide and has a three-bat median risalitr.

== Today ==
The building is still part of Christianshavn School and is used for the school's after school programmes (Danish: Fritidshjem).
