= Stephen Hansen =

Danish industrialist, businessman and General War Commissioner

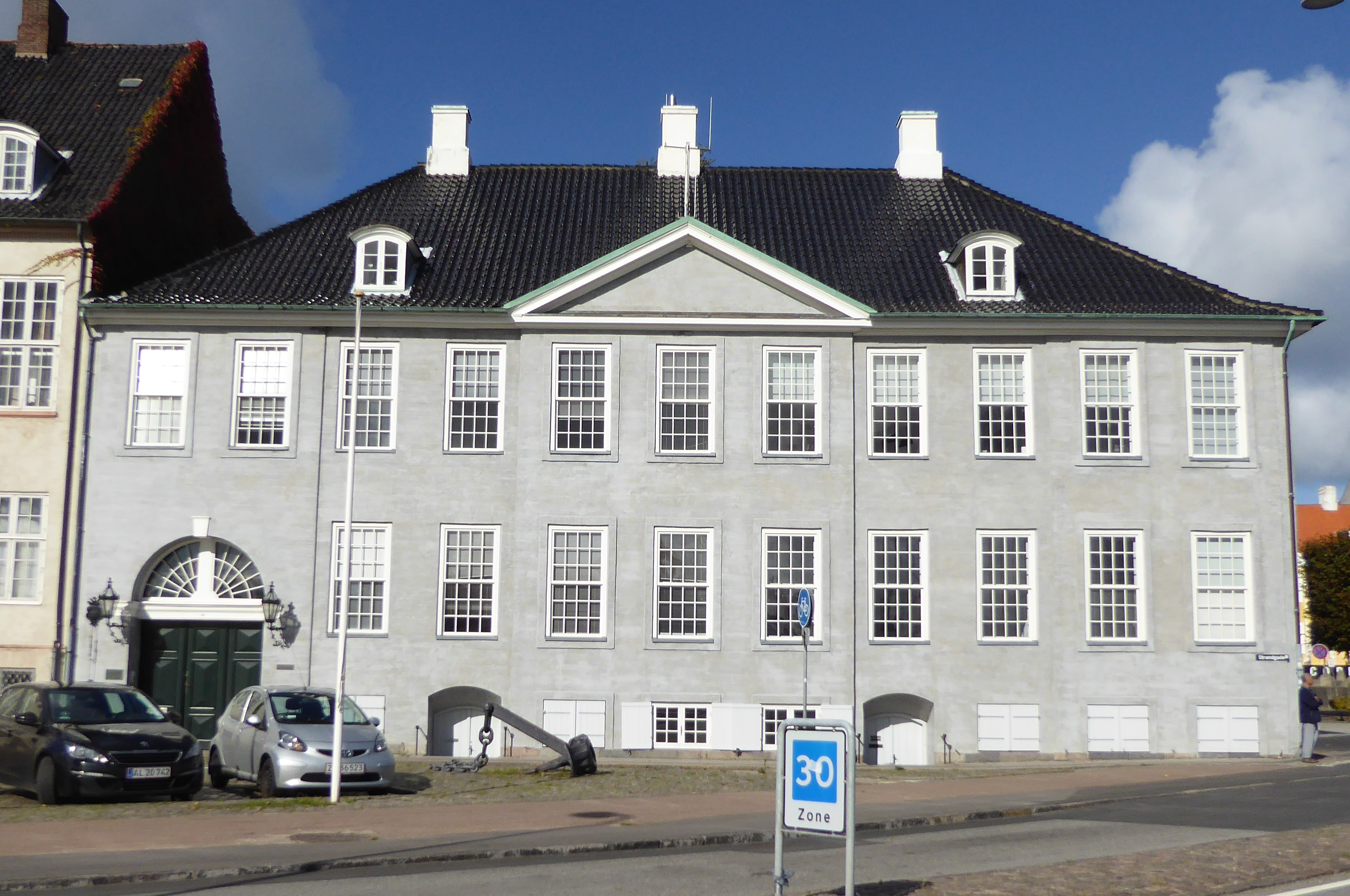
The Stephen Hansen Mansion at Strandgade 95 in Helsingør, Denmark

Stephen Hansen (28 September 1701 – 22 January 1770) was a Danish industrialist, businessman and General War Commissioner. He is most known for his involvement with Kronborg Rifle Factory in Hellebæk and for building Hellebækgård as well as the Stephen Hansen Mansion on the harbourfront in Helsingør.

== Early life and military career ==
Hansen was born on 28 August 1701 in the village of Skodsbøl in the Parish of Oddum in western Jutland. His parents were Hans Terkelsen and Birgitte Cathrine Christensd. His father His father was bogd-ridefoged and leased (fpråagter) Østergård at Lyhne. He later bought a farm in Skodbøl as well as a fifty percent stake in Rahbek in Oddum. Stephan Hansen's sister Anna Elisabeth West was married to Svenning Andersen, owner of Søndervang.

== Career ==
Little is known about his early years. In 1728, he was appointed to quartermaster at the Artillery Regiment and shortly thereafter also to recruitment officer (Danish: Mønsterskriver) and Judge Advocate General (Danish: Auditør) at the Naval Artillery. In 1747, he was appointed to Superior War Commissioner but resigned from the military in 1750 to focus on his civil career as an industrialist and merchant.

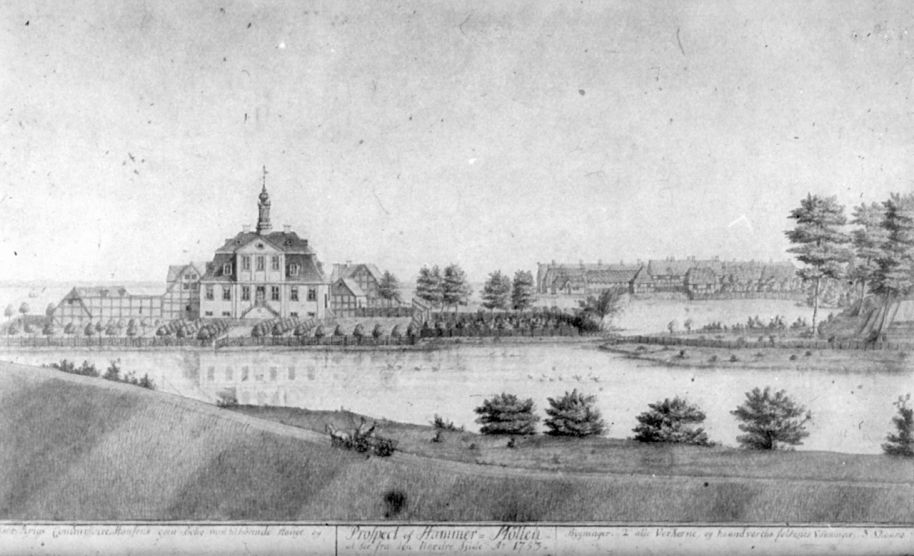
Stephen Hansen's Hellebækgård from 1747 as it appeared prior to the rebuilding in 1768

In 1743, Hansen purchased Hellebækgård and the Hammermøllen industrial enterprise which was in a state of neglect. He expanded the factory and improved operations. He obtained a 20-year monopoly on the manufacture of rifles in Denmark and benefited tremendously from the Seven Year War (1756–1763)when he supplied rifles for the Danish army in Holstein. In 1761, he was appointed to General War Commissioner.

Hansen was also involved in trade on the Faroe Islands on which he had a monopoly from 1750 until 1770. In 1759, he commissioned Philip de Lange to build a Rococo-style mansion in Strandgade in Helsingør.

In 1765, Hansen sold Kronborg Rifle Factory to the Danish state for 70,000 Rigsdaler and that same year acquired Frydendal Manor at Holbæk.

== Personal life and legacy ==
Hansen married on 23 November 1733 in Viborg to Dorothea Sophie Rafn (1710–1773), daughter of mayor of Viborg Hans Knudsen Rafn. He died on 22 January 1770 and is buried at Frederick's German Church in Copenhagen.

He had two sons and two daughters. The son Wilhelm Aigist Hansen (1844–1796) took over Frydendal as well as Hansen's Faroese trading company. He was also involved in the new Finmark, Iceland and Greenland Tradeing Company (founded in 1781). He was a member of the Great Agricultural Commission and Roskilde Constituent Assembly. The younger son Christian Frederik Hansen was district governor (amtmand) of Ringkøbing Amt. The elder daughter Antoinette Hansen (1741–1804) married the layer Peter Uldall. The younger daughter Birgitte Cathrine Hansen (1845–1880) was married to the prominent Helsingør-based businessman Gift med Jean Christopher van Deurs.
