= Kunstforeningen =

Organization in Copenhagen, Denmark

Coordinates: 55.6776°N 12.5776°E

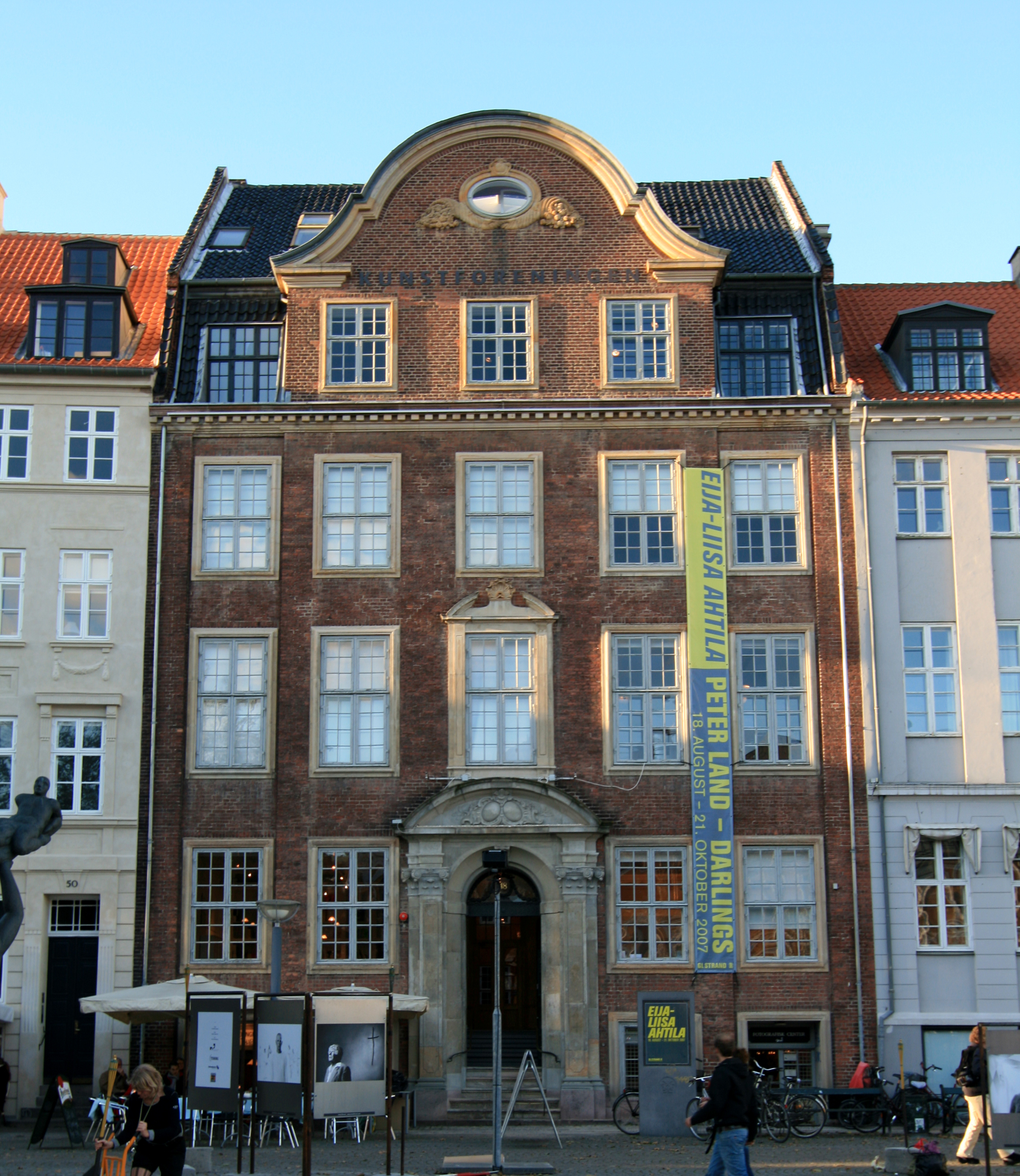
48 Gammel Strand, Copenhagen, by Philip de Lange (1750)

Kunstforeningen (English The Art Society), now officially called Gammel Strand after its address, is an exhibition space and non-profit membership organization located at Gammel Strand in Copenhagen, Denmark. It was founded in 1825 to promote and support art through public exhibitions, lectures, acquisitions of art works for distribution among the members, support of artists and publications on art.

== History ==
Kunstforeningen was founded as a temporary society in 1825 by a circle of the most influential figures of the Danish art world during the Danish Golden Age. They were Johan Christian Fick, professors J. L. Lund, C. W. Eckersberg and G. F. Hetsch from the Royal Danish Academy of Fine Arts, the landscape painter J. P. Møller, the art historian Niels Laurits Høyen and Just Mathias Thiele, the secretary of the academy. In 1827, it became a more well-defined and active organization but by 1829 still had only 71 members. The purpose was to broaden the knowledge of art and to bridge the gap between the elite and a wider public. From the beginning, it also aimed to influence and not just support the Danish scene, probably prompted by Høyen. This was achieved by commissioning artworks, rather than just buying finished works, and through prize competitions. After opposition among members in 1835, this activist practice was toned down in 1835 and more focus was directed at the acquisition and redistribution among members. The society also funded various public artworks. The first public art exhibition was held in 1828 and featured 117 paintings by Jens Juel.

In 1835, the society had grown to 1,100 and in the early 1860s it had reached 1,700 members. Weekly sessions were held at Hotel Du Nord, and from 1826 at the Freemasons Hall, while the exhibitions were held at the City Hall. Later the society's activities relocated several more times before finding their current base at Gammel Strand in 1952. Ever since, the focus has increasingly been on art exhibitions.

On 26 September 2010, the building reopened after a major renovation.

== Building ==
Kunstforeningen's building at Gammel Strand is a town house from 1750. It was designed by Philip de Lange.

== Kunstforeningen today ==
Kunstforeningen hosts five exhibitions every year. The emphasis is on Danish and international contemporary art. One of the annual exhibitions is of works by the year's graduates from the Royal Danish Academy of Fine Arts.

The building has a second entrance at the rear, at Læderstræde 15, which is recommended for those in wheelchairs or with prams since it has an elevator providing direct access to all floors.

== See also ==
- Danish Golden Age
