= Stephen Hansen Mansion =

Mansion in Helsingør, Denmark

- Stephen Hansens Palæ
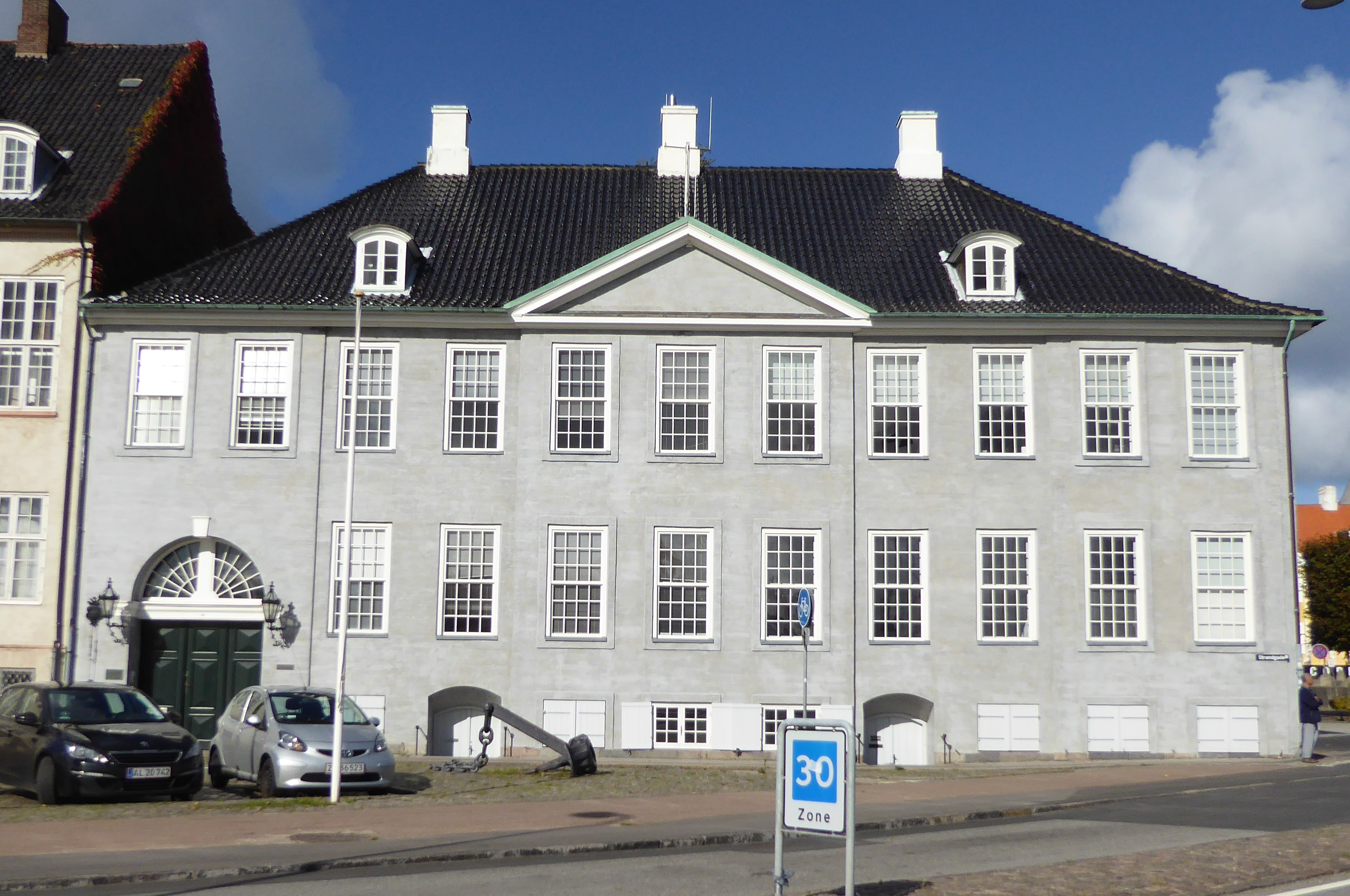
- The house viewed from Wibroes Plads
- Interactive map of the Stephen Hansen Mansion area

General information
- Architectural style: Early Rococo
- Location: Helsingør, Denmark
- Coordinates: 56°2′6″N 12°36′55.97″E
- Construction started: 1759
- Inaugurated: 1654
- Client: Stephen Hansen

Design and construction
- Architect: Philip de Lange

The Stephan Hansen Mansion (Danish: Stephen Hansens Palæ) is a listed town mansion overlooking Wibroes Plads and the Øresund in Helsingør, Denmark. It was built by Philip de Lange and represents the transition from Baroque to Rococo architecture.

== History ==
=== Hansen and van Deurs families ===
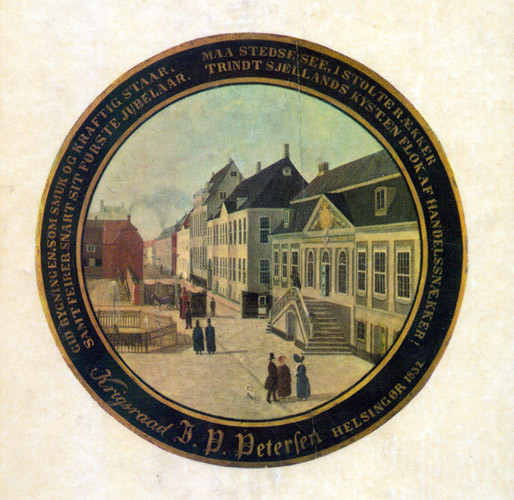
The Stephen Hansen Mansion seen on a ceremonial shooting target. The now demolished Øresund Custom House is sen to the right

Stephen Hansen acquired an older building at the site in 1756. It was located next to Øresund Custom House. Hansen had taken over the weapons factory in Hellebæk in 1743 and was one of the wealthiest men in the city. Hansen demolished the house in Strandgade in 1759 and commissioned Philip de Lange to build a new house. Lange had already worked for him on Hellebækgård in 1747. To which extent the house was built for his own use or for his daughter and son-in-law is unclear. They had recently been married and Hansen also bought another house where they could live until the new one was completed. Most of his own time was spent at Hellebækgård. The construction of the new house had almost been completed when it was interrupted by the threat of war against Russia and Prussia. Hansen's daughter and son-in-law moved into the house in 1764. Hansen's daughter died in 1876 and the son in law Jean Christopher van Deurs then bought the house for borrowed money.

=== Classen family ===
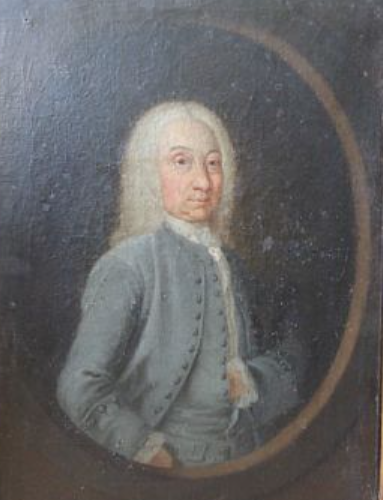
Andreas Classen.

Jean Cheristopher van Deurs ran Salig van Deur's Enke in partnership with his brother-in-law Andreas Classen. The company was later continued by the latter's son Jean Jacob Classen. He constructed the neighboring Classen Mansion. In 1795, he also acquired the Stephan Hansen Mansion.

=== Borries ===
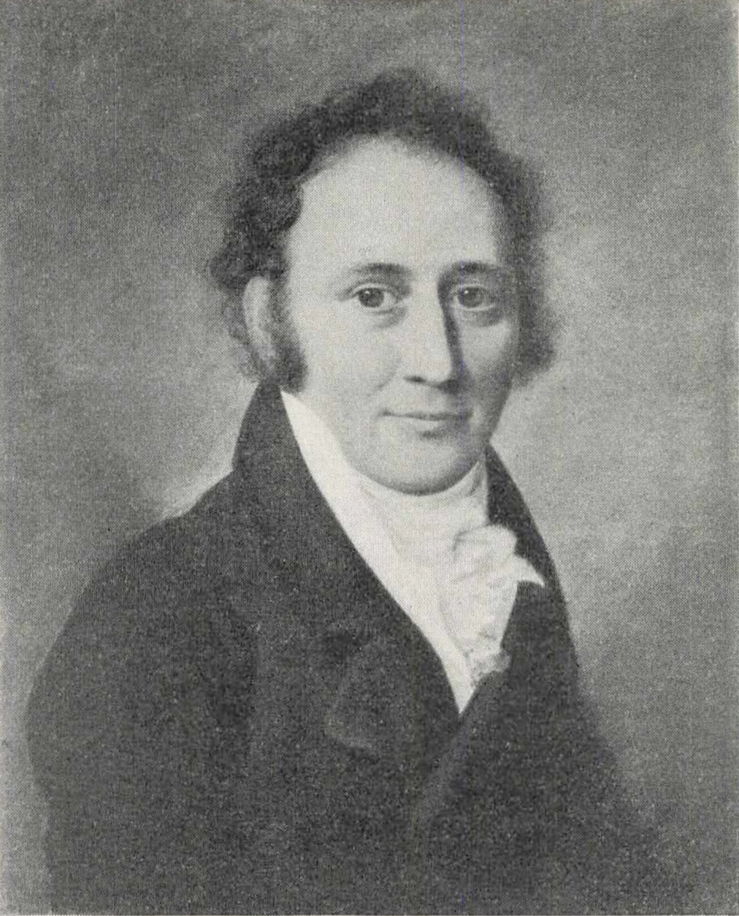
Johann Christian Nicolaus Borries.

Johann Christian Nicolaus Borries was employed as managing director of the firm when Jean Classen died in 1806. In 1809, he married Classen's sister Mariane. In 1816, when the old company was liquidized and Arent van Deurs & Co. was created by him in its place, he also acquired the Stephan Hansen Mansion. Borries died in 1857. The company closed in 1862.

=== Later history ===
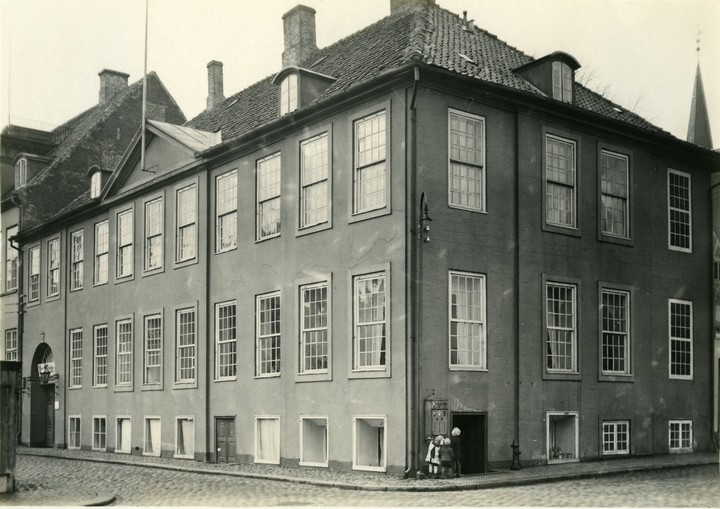
The Stephen Hansen Mansion in the 1920s

Jean Christopher van Deurs also ran his business from the house. He was active as a "ship handler" and owned the van Deurs Trade House. The latter had been owned in an equal partnership with Andreas Classen since 1756. Andreas Classen's son Jean Jacob Classen, who took over his father's share in the company and constructed the adjacent Classen Mansion (Strandgade 93) in 1791. purchased the Stephen Hansen Mansion in 1809. The English wars brought difficult times for the shipping industry and the trading company went bankrupt in 1816. Part of the company was saved but the abolishon of the Sound Dues in 1857 was another hard blow for Helsingør's maritime sector and it had to close in 1862. Bank of Denmark took over the building but sold it to the merchant Peter Christian Winecken in 1866. The buildings surroundings changed when the adjacent Øresund Custom House was demolished in connection with an expansion of the harbor. Winecken divided the house into three apartments. In 1881, it was acquired by Peter Carl Jessen Holsøe, a barrister, whose family owned it until 1927. The new owner was Christian Krøyer, an architect, who sold it to Helsingør Municipality in 1938. Helsingør Port Council used the building from 1947. DSB purchased the building in 1976 but sold it again in 1990.

== Architecture ==
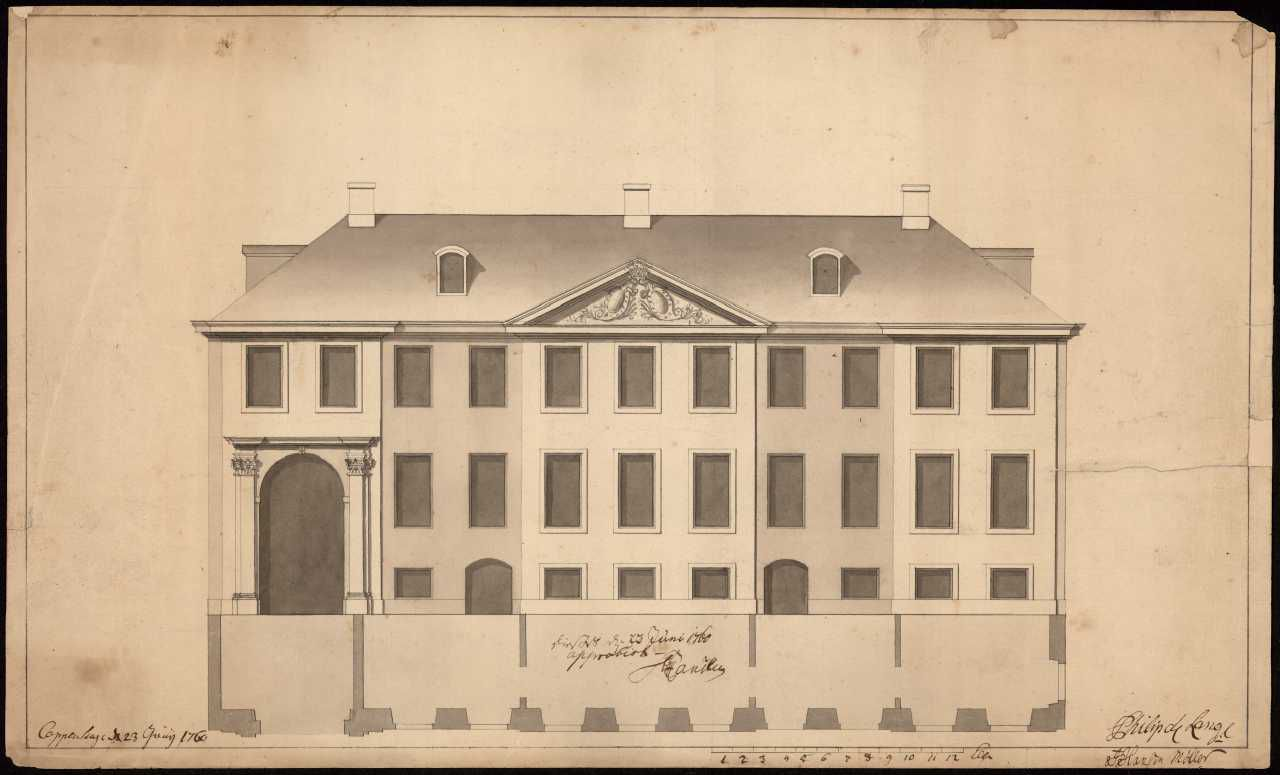
Re

The main building represents the transition from Baroque to Rococo architecture. Its front has a three-bay central projection tipped by a triangular pediment but otherwise few decorations. It is likely that the building has originally stood in blank brick, similarly ro what is seen on its rear side. The building has Sash windows, a very rare sight in Danish architecture but once quite normal in Helsingør although the Stephen Hansen Mansion is the only building in the city where they have survived. Sash windows have also been used by Philip de Lange on other buildings, including Møinichen's Mansion on Købmagergade in Copenhagen. The roof is vlad with black-glazed tiles.

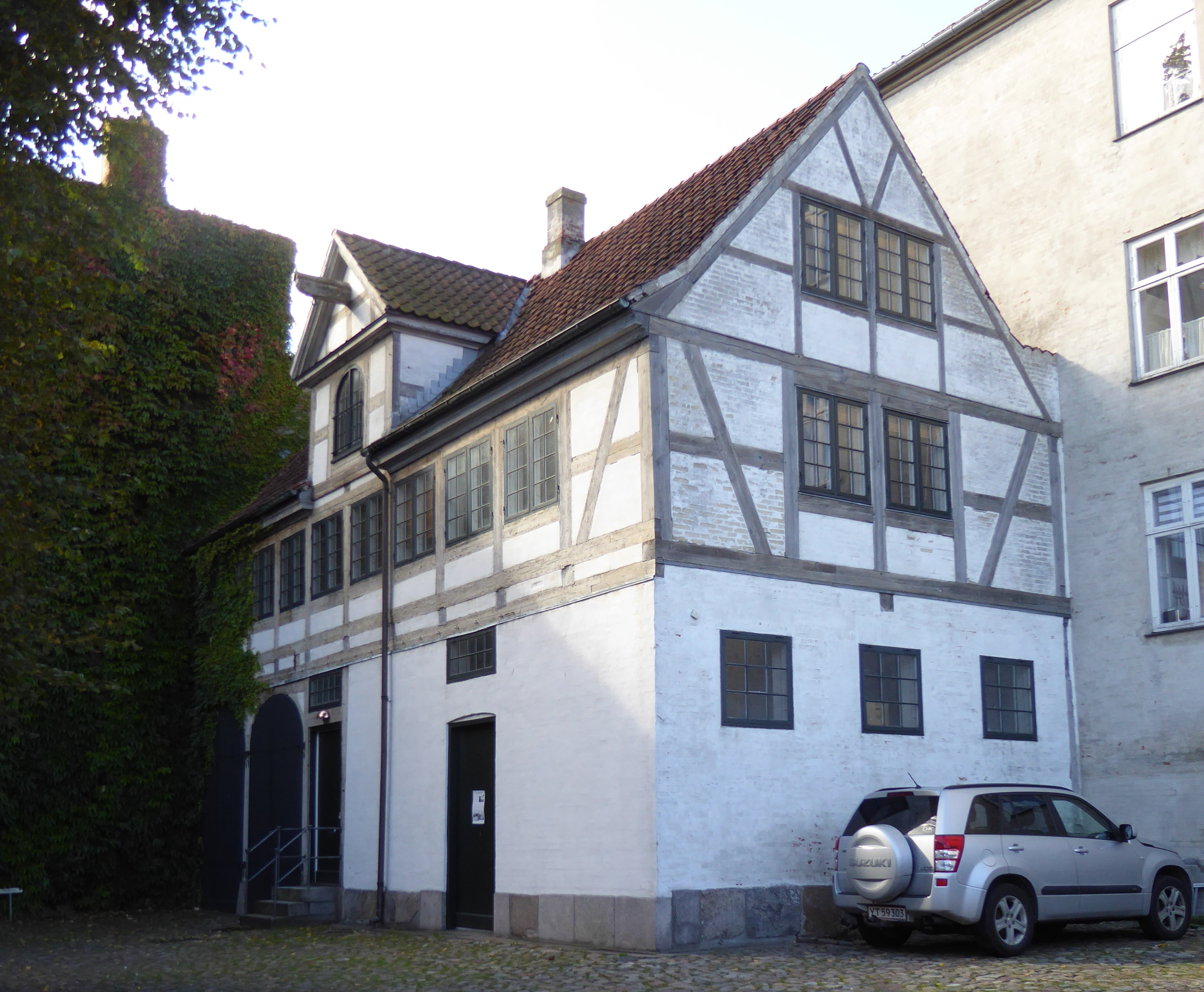
The building in the courtyard

The main wing's gate is flanked by two rough iron lamps. The gate opens onto a cobbled courtyard. The gate in the wall on Sofie Brahe Gade was created by Christian Krøyer in the 1920s. The half-timbered building in the courtyard contained stables and room for several carriages. The upper floors served as servants quarters.

== Cultural references ==
The house appears in the 1958 drama film Styrmand Karlsen.

== See also ==
- Fairyhill (Helsingør)
