= Philip de Lange =

Dutch-Danish architect

- Born: c. 1705
- Died: 17 September 1766; Copenhagen, Denmark
- Occupation: Architect

Philip de Lange (c. 1705 – 17 September 1766) was a leading Dutch-Danish architect who designed many different types of building in various styles including Dutch Baroque and Rococo.

== Early life and family ==
Philip de Lange was probably born near Strasbourg and was trained as a mason in the Netherlands. He arrived in Copenhagen, Denmark, in 1729 where he quickly gained a reputation as an architect and master builder.

== Achievements ==
De Lange created a large number of works of various types including civil and military buildings, mansions, country houses, warehouses, factories, churches and parks.

The Dutch Baroque influence in his early work can, for example, be seen in the premises he built for Ziegler, the pastry cook, at Nybrogade 12 (1732). While initially he appears to have been struck by Ewert Janssen's earlier work, he soon seems to have been influenced by Elias Häusser and Lauritz de Thurah.

Like Krieger, he participated strongly in creating fine bourgeois dwellings in Copenhagen, especially the gabled houses on Købmagergade.

His most notable achievements include the Headquarters of the Asiatic Company in Christianshavn (1739), the Masting Crane on Holmen (1750) and Stephen Hansen's Mansion in Helsingør (1763). He also adapted Glorup Manor on Funen to the Baroque style adding a magnificent mansard roof (1744).

For almost 30 years, de Lange was the leading master builder at the Holmen Naval Station. Among other things, he constructed 24 Nyboder two-storey houses from 1754 to 1756.

De Lange is remembered above all for his fine, simple buildings in the classical Rococo style. A good example is Damsholte Church on the island of Møn, the only Rococo village church in Denmark.

== Personal life ==
De Lange married twice: first with Jacomine Pieters in the Hague (1724), then with Anna Lucia Ehlers in Copenhagen (1738).

== List of works ==
- Åbenrå 32, Copenhagen (1739s)
- Marskalsgården, Købmagergade, Copenhagen (1729-1732)
- Reformed Church's rectory, Åbenrå 32-34, Copenhagen (1730-32)
- Ziegler House, Nybrogade, Copenhagen (1732)
- Danish Asiatic Company, Asiatisk Plads, Christianshavn, Copenhagen (1738)
- Tugt- og børnehuset (1739-1741, demolished)

Arsenalet, Holmen, Copenhagen (1741-1745 and 1745)

- Damsholte Church, Møn (1742-1743)
- Adaption of Glorup Manor, Funen (1743-1744)
- Nyholm Central Guardhouse, Golmen (1744-1745)
- Gunpowder magazine, Frederick's Bastion, Christianshavn (1745-1746m built from a design by Vauban)
- Skagen Lighthouse, Skagen (1747)
- Extension of Husby Church, Funen (1747-1748)

Ø Ved Stranden 16, Copenhagen (1748)

- Mastekranen, Holmen, Copenhagen (1749)
- Gammel Strand 48 (now Kunstforeningen, Copenhagen (1750–1751)
- Møllmanns Landsted, Allégade 6, Frederiksberg, Copenhagen (1750s)
- Nyboder (two-storey houses), Copenhagen (1758)
- Philip de Lange House, Prinsessegade 54, Christianshavn, Copenhagen (c. 1760)
- Store Mariendal, Strandvejen, Hellerup (1759, demolished)
- Stephen Hansen Mansion, Helsingør (1759-1760
- Roysal Pawn, Gammel Strand, Copenhagen (1762)
- Hovedmagasinet and Takkelloftet, Holmen (1767-1772, design by Lange)
- Warehouse for Danish Asiatic Company, Asiatisk Plads, Christianshavn, Copenhagen (1781, design by Lange)

== Gallery ==
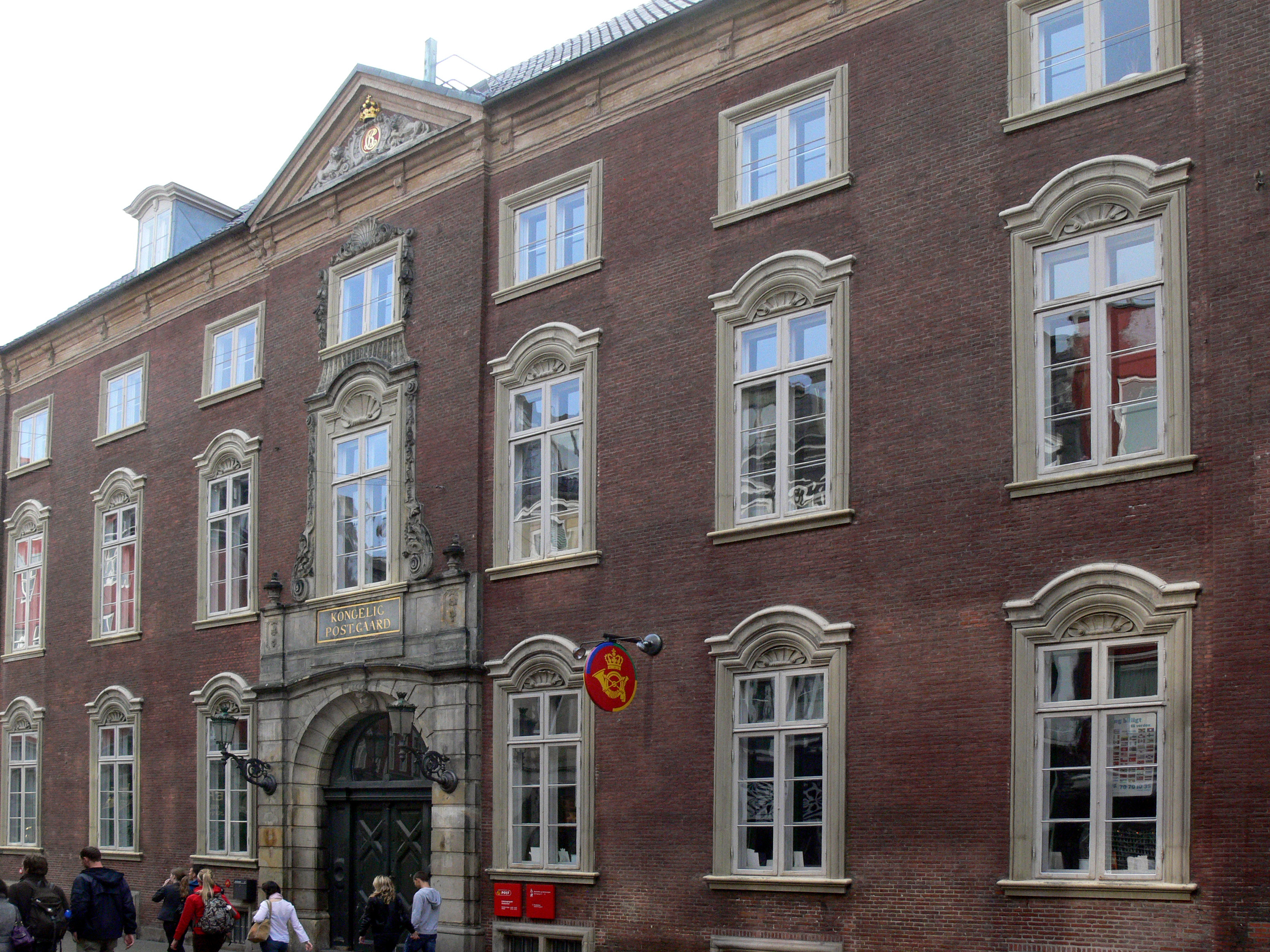
Marskalsgården, Copenhagen

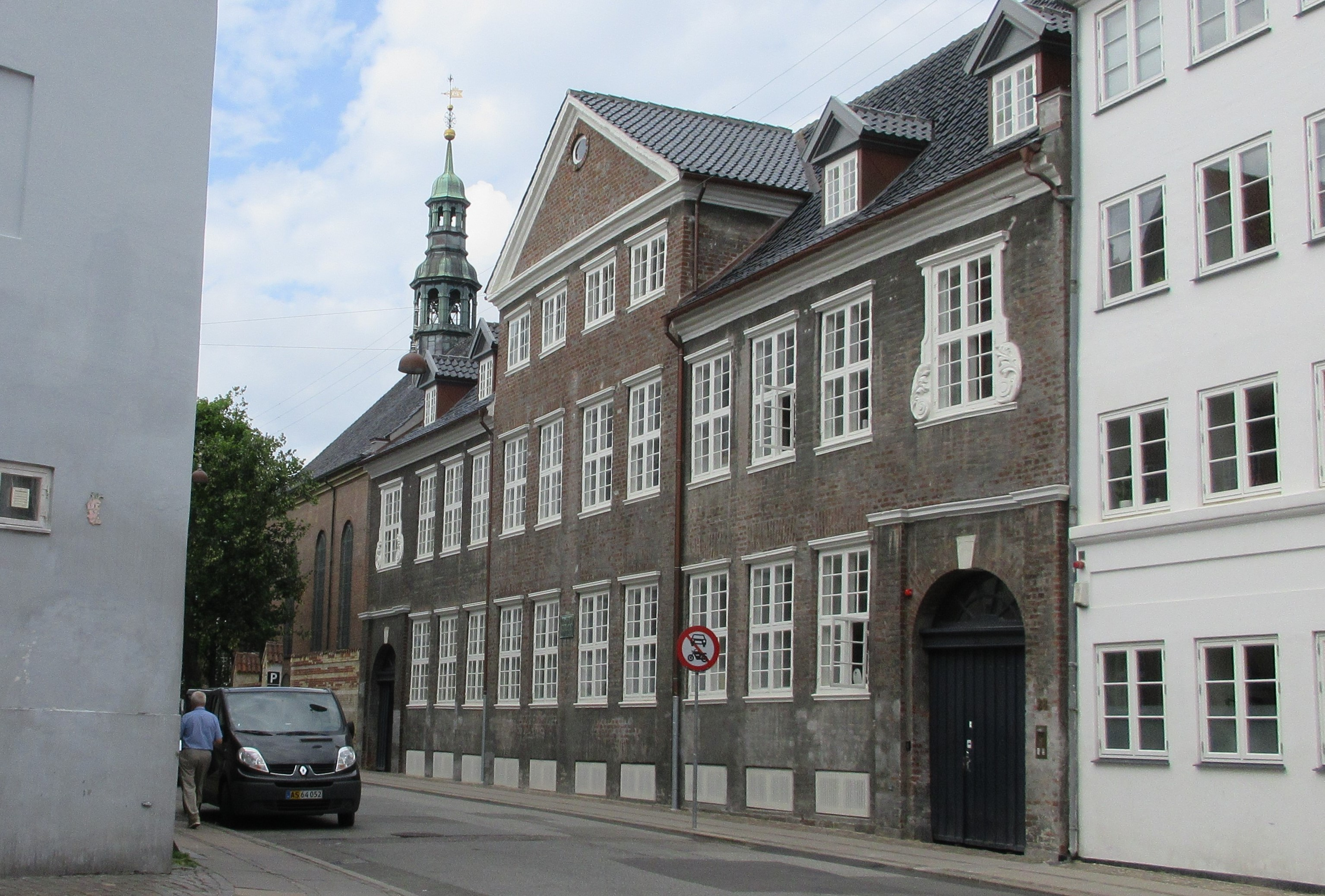
Reformed Church's rectory, Copenhagen

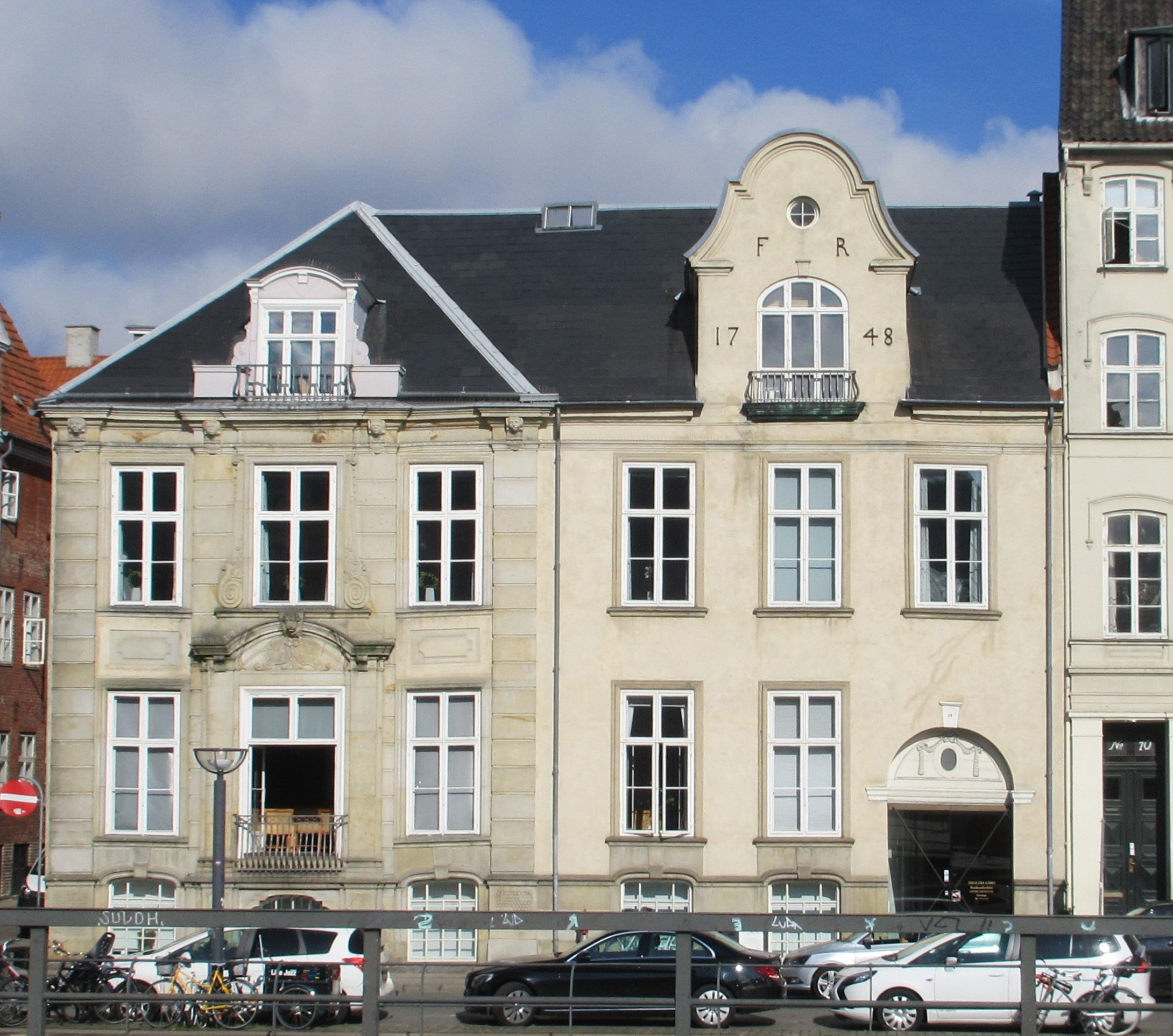
Ziegler House, Nybrogade, Copenhagen

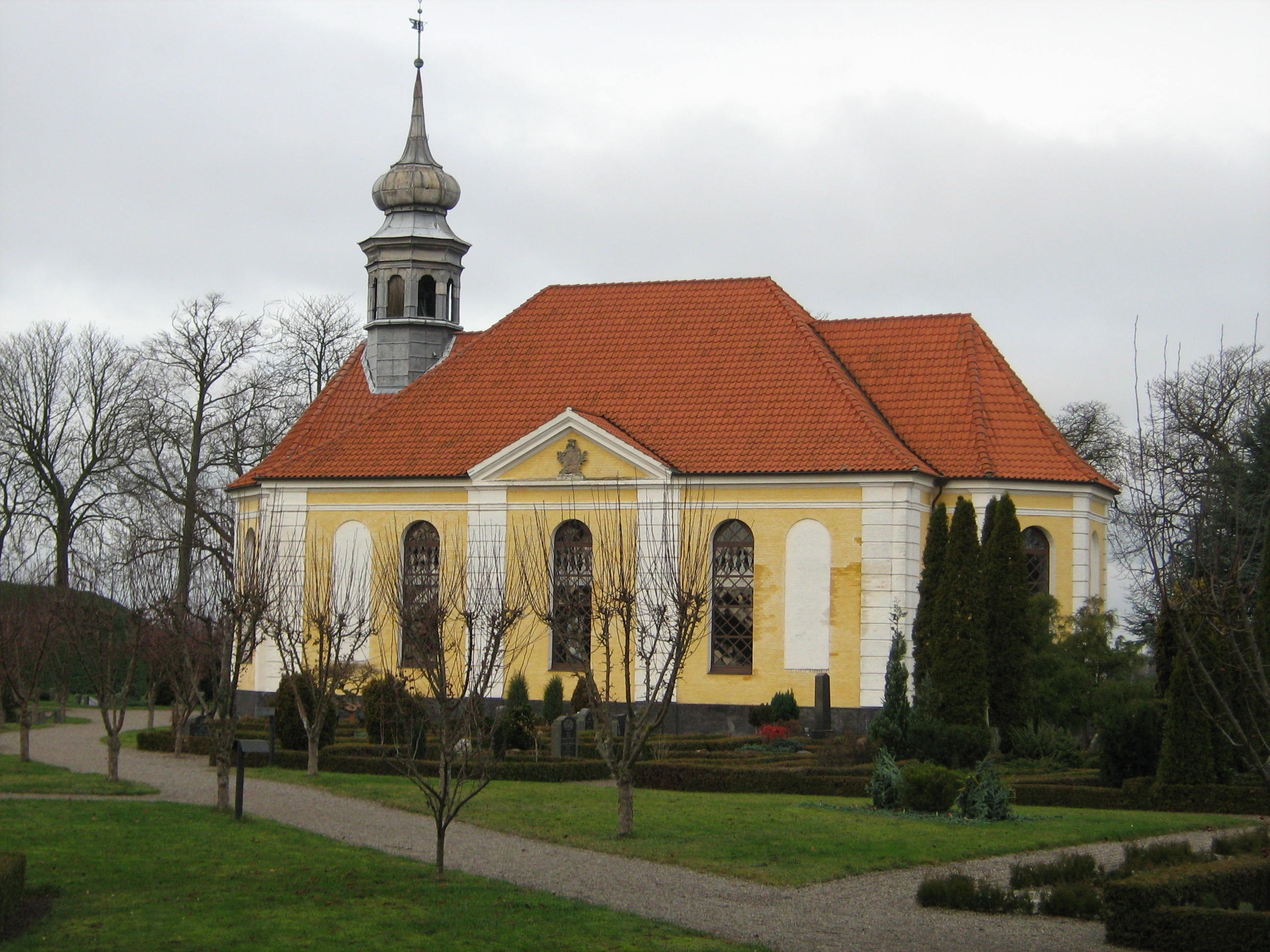
Damsholte Church, Møn

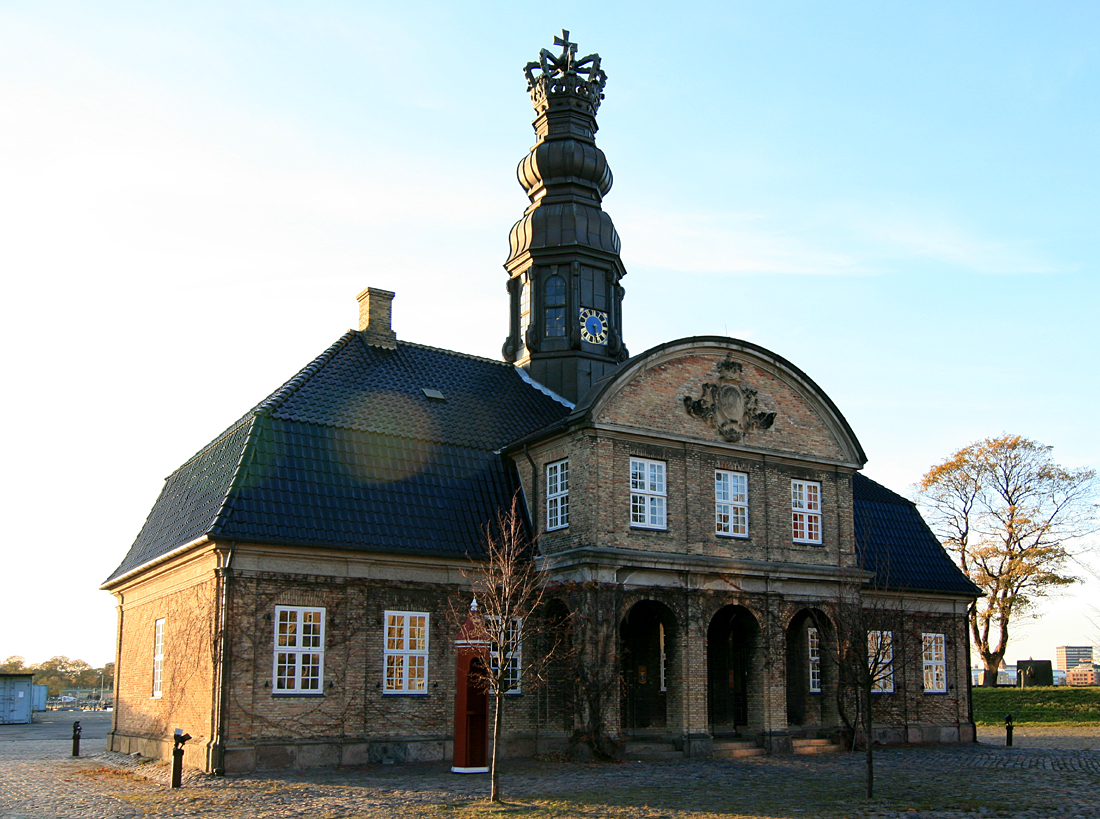
Nyholm Central Guardhouse, Copenhagen

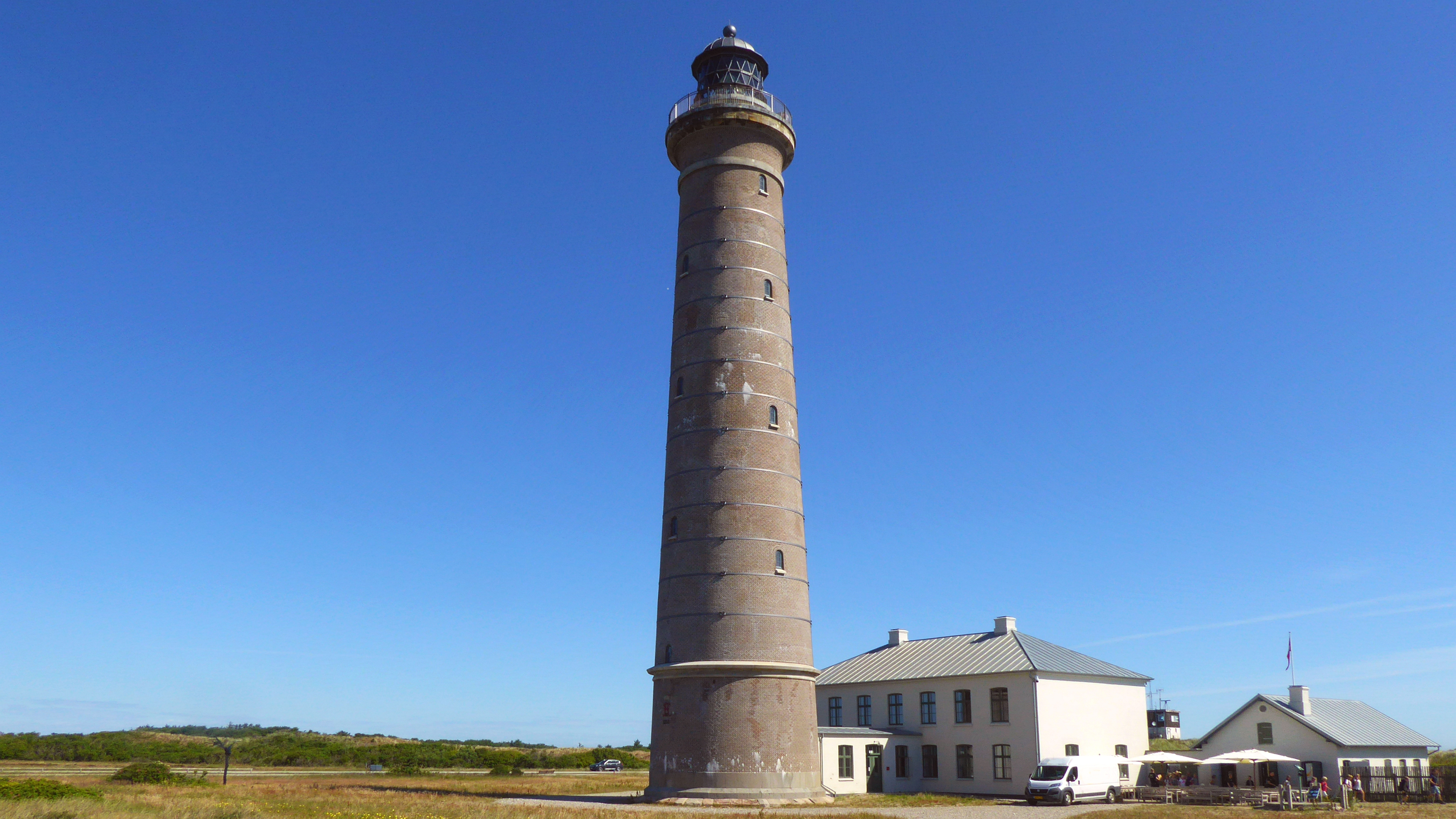
Skagen Lighthouse, Skagen

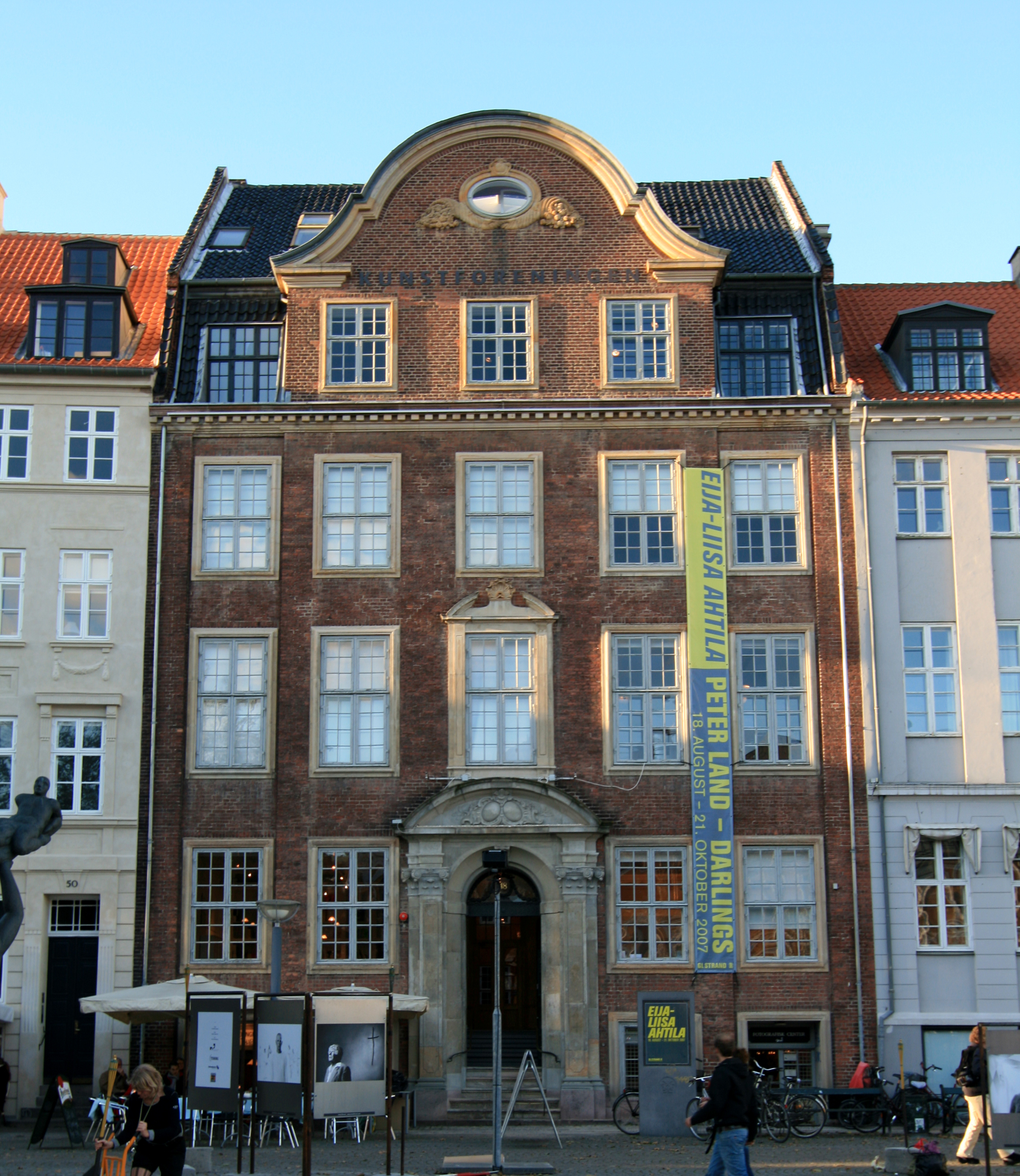
Kunstforeningen, Copenhagen

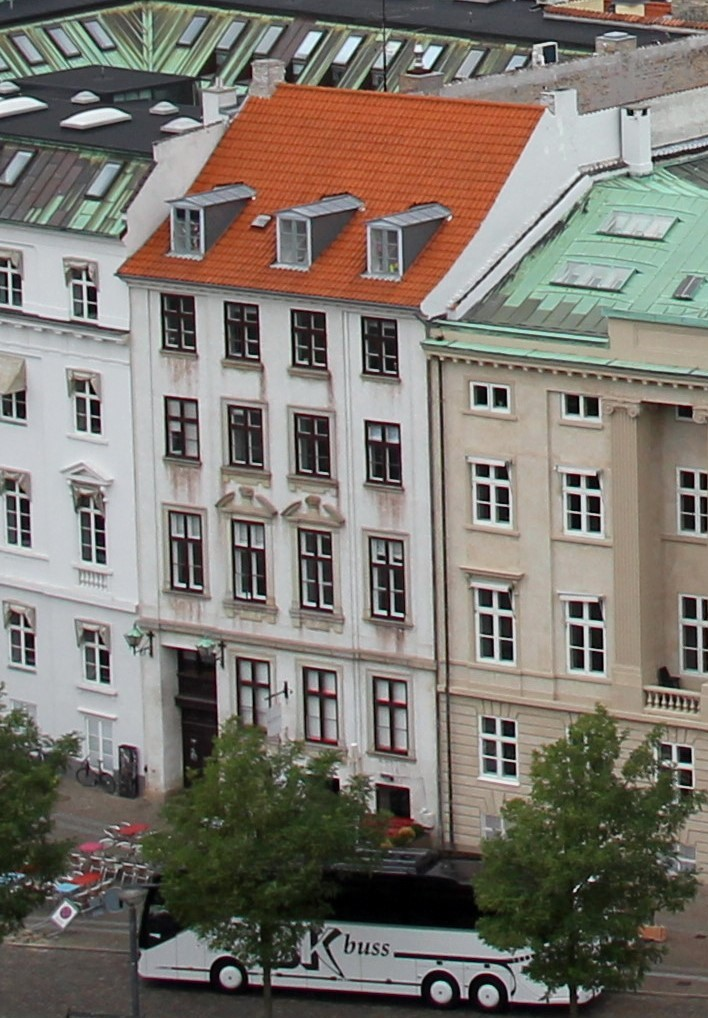
Ved Stranden 16, Copenhagen

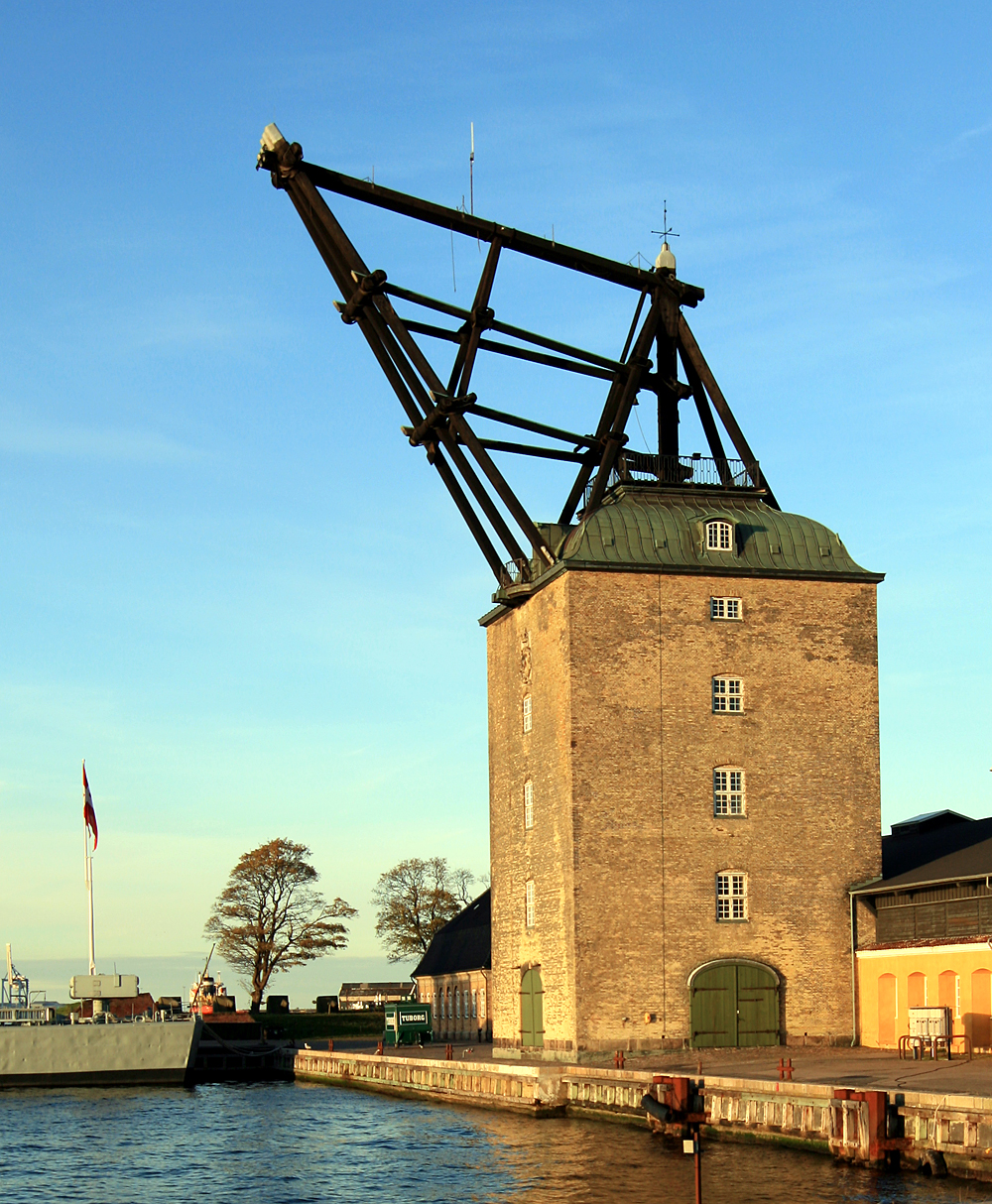
Mastekranen, Copenhagen

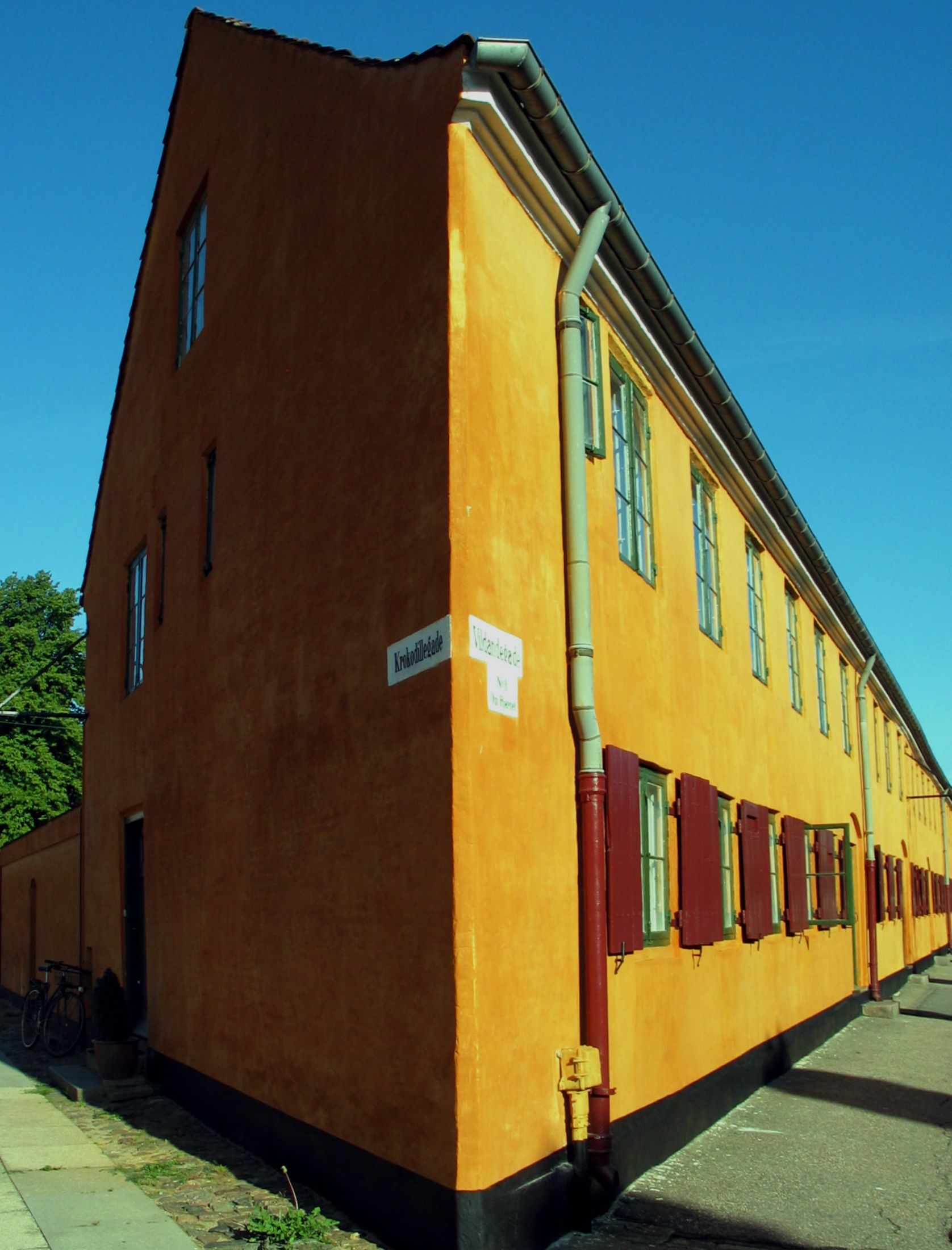
Nyboder, Copenhagen

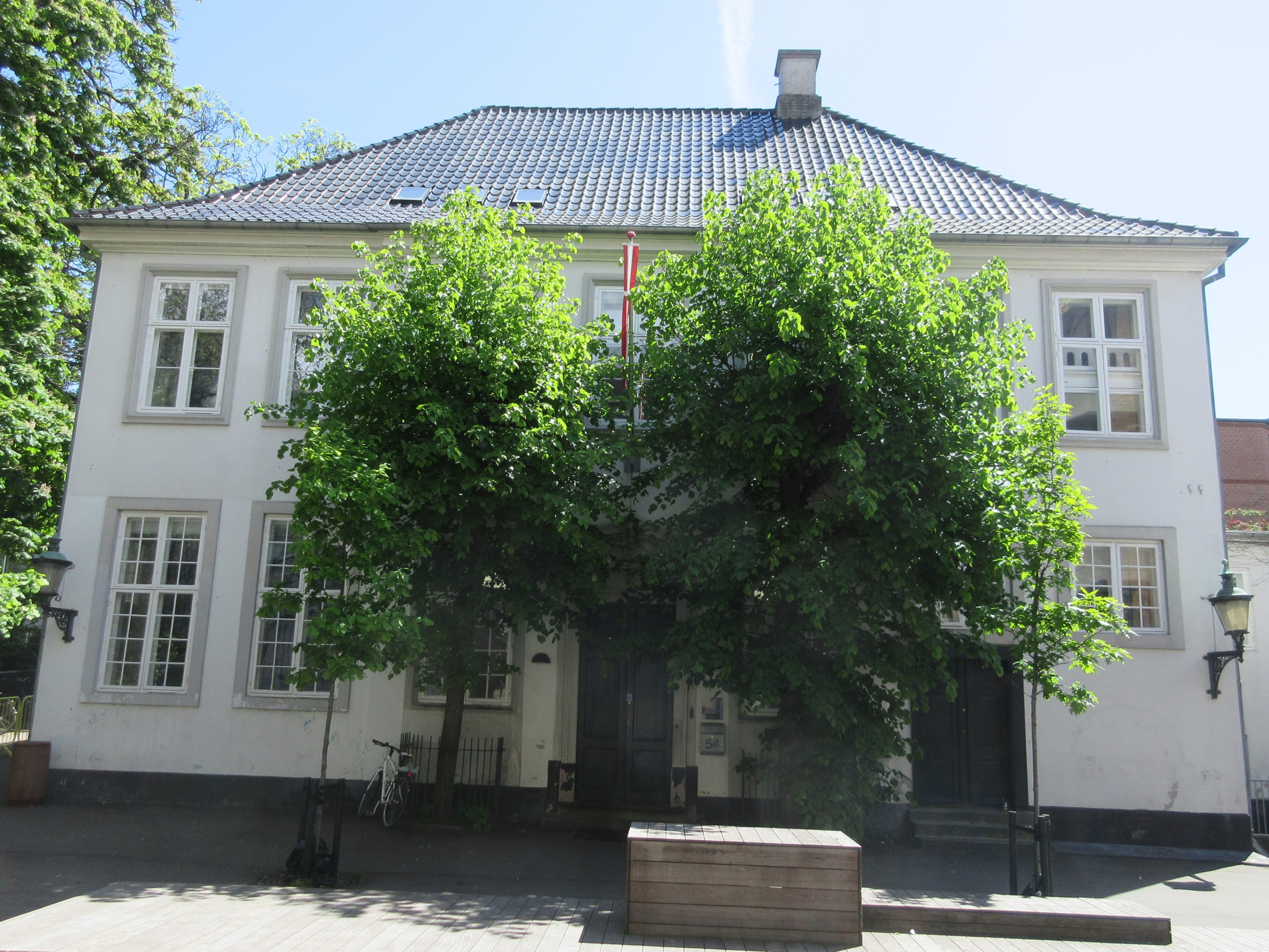
Philip de Lange House, Copenhagen

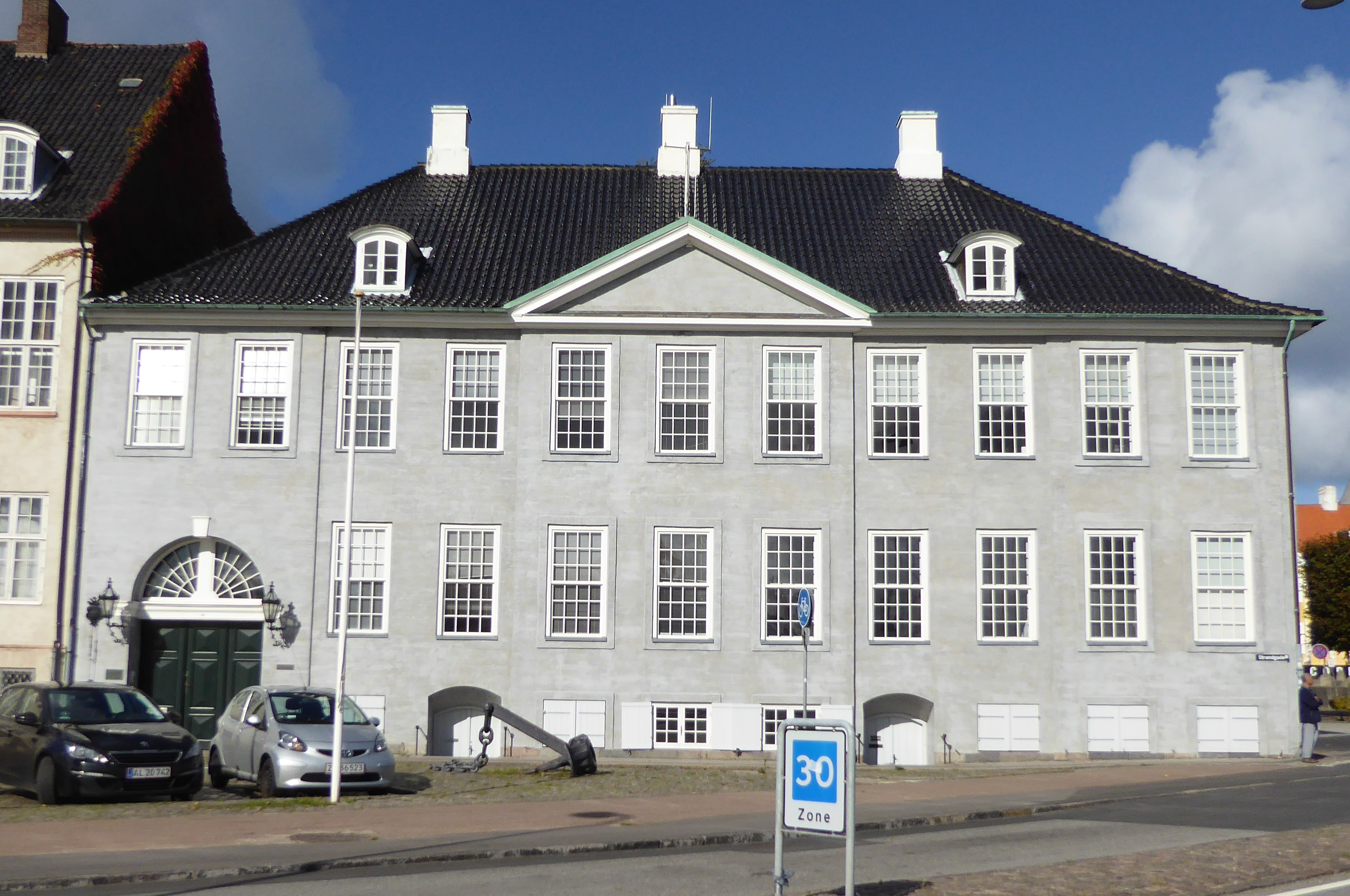
Stephen Hansen Mansion, Helsingør

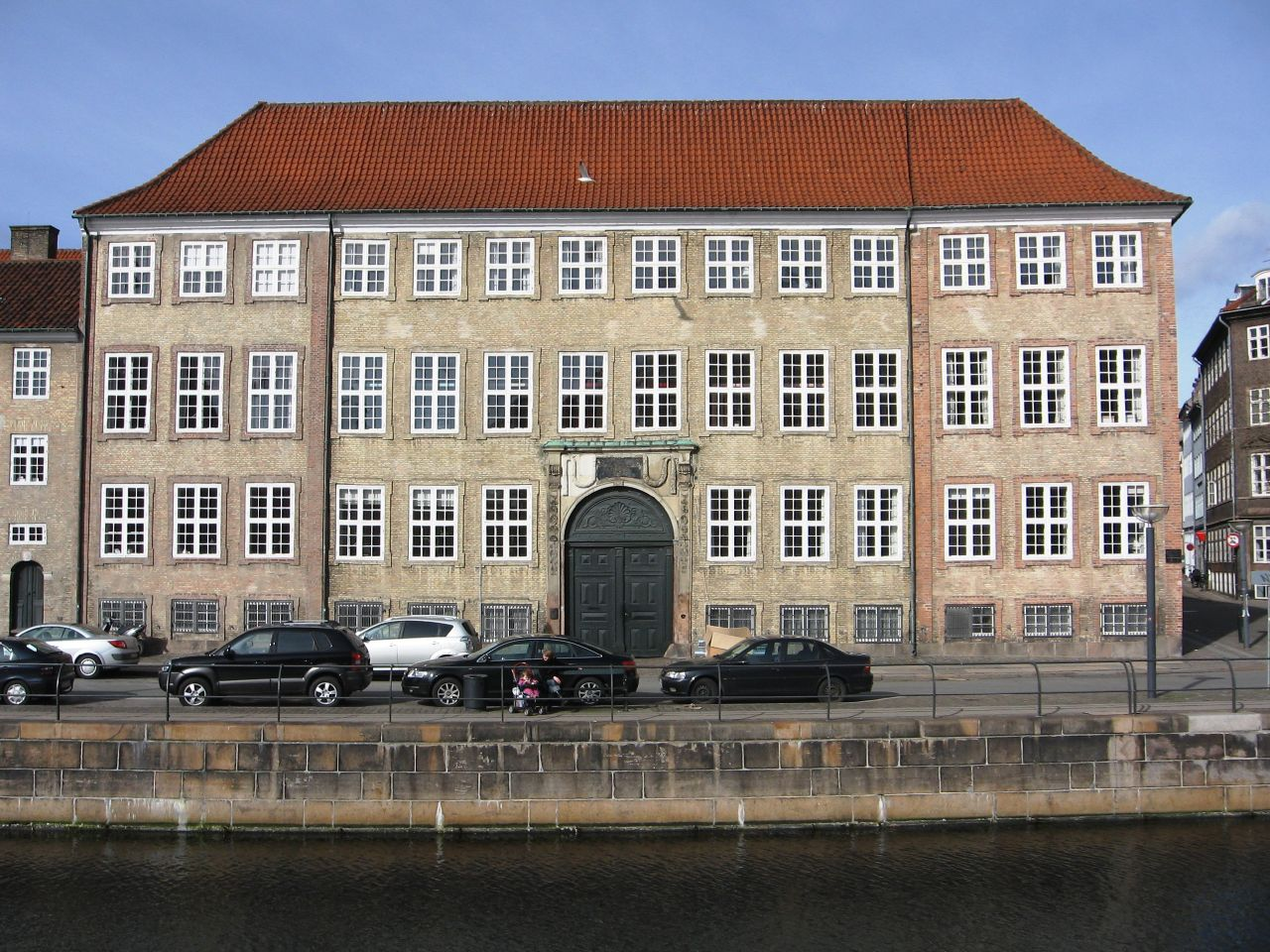
Royal Pawn, Copenhagen (1762)

== See also ==
- Architecture of Denmark
- Wedell Mansion
- Philip Lange

== Bibliography ==
- Elling, Christian: Philip de Lange. En studie i dansk Barokarkitektur. Akademisk Arkitektforening, Copenhagen. 1931, 48 pp.
- Rikke Tønnes: Stephen Hansens palæ - Bygherren - Arkitekten Philip de Lange - Livet i og omkring et helsingørsk handelshus, Copenhagen: Arkitektens Forlag, 1997, 228 pp.
