= Christianshavn School =

Public primary school in Copenhagen, Denmark

Coordinates: 55.6743°N 12.5964°E

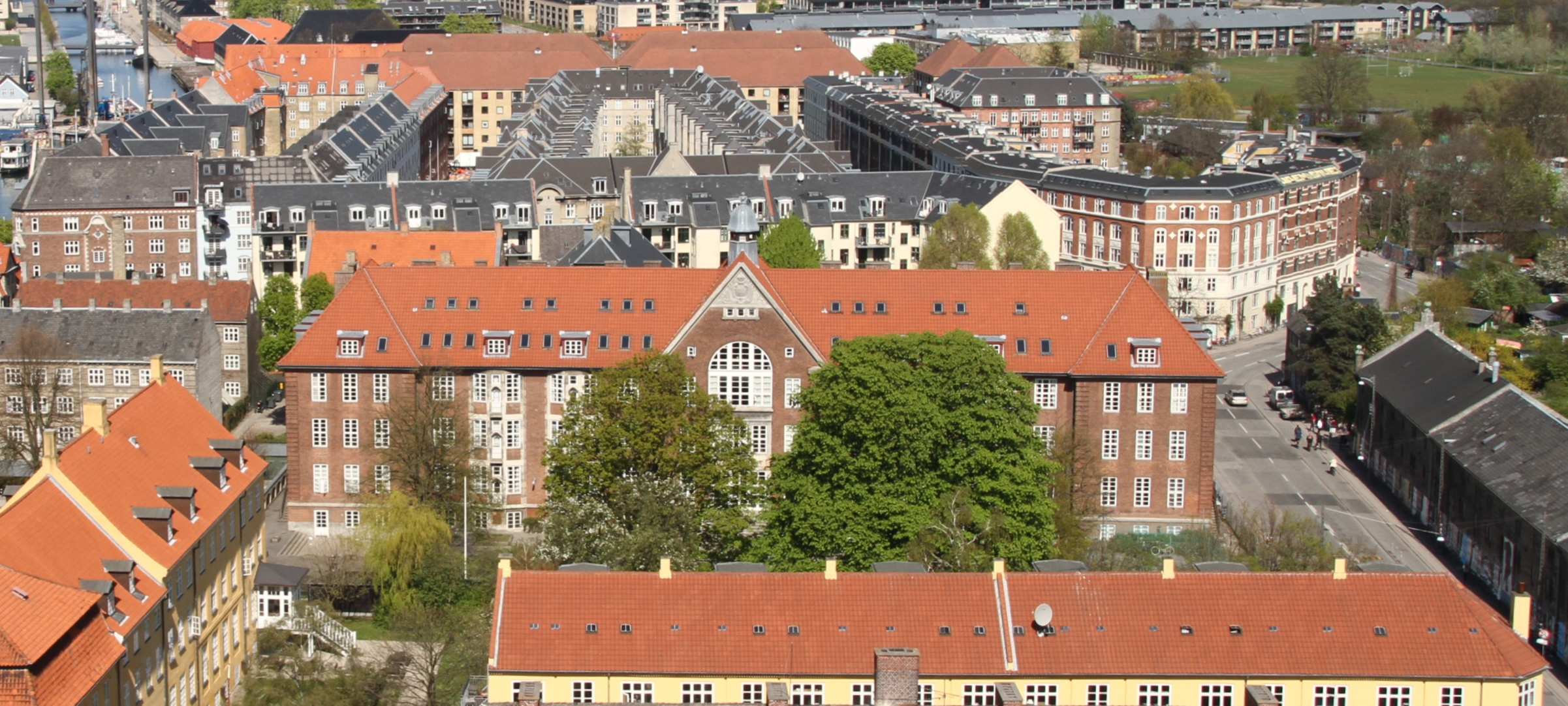
Christianshavn School seen from the top of Church of Our Saviour

Christianshavn School (Danish: Christianshavns Skole) is a public primary school in the Christianshavn district of Copenhagen, Denmark. The building is a former naval hospital.

== History ==
The building was originally a hospital, Marinehospitalet, for the Royal Danish Navy, built in 1915 to designs by Bernhard Ingemann. It was inaugurated on 6 April 1915 and existed until 1928 when replaced by the new military hospital Københavns Militærhospital on Tagensvej which also replaced the military hospital in Rigensgade. The building was then taken over by Østifternes Åndssvageanstalt, a psychiatric hospital, which was based there until 1940. When Denmark was occupied by Nazi Germany on 9 April 1940, they confiscated Værløse Airfield, leaving Hærens Lufttropper homeless. They took over the former Naval Hospital on 7 October which then became known as Prinsessegade's Barracks. One Danish officer was wounded at the installation when the German occupying forces arrested the remaining Danish military and police forces on 29 August 1943. The building was then confiscated and used as a German lazaretto for the remaining part of the war.

The building was purchased by Copenhagen Municipality in 1949 and converted into a public primary school. It opened in August 1950.

== See also ==
- Søkvæsthuset
