= Møinichen Mansion =

Building in Copenhagen, Denmark

- Møinichens Palæ
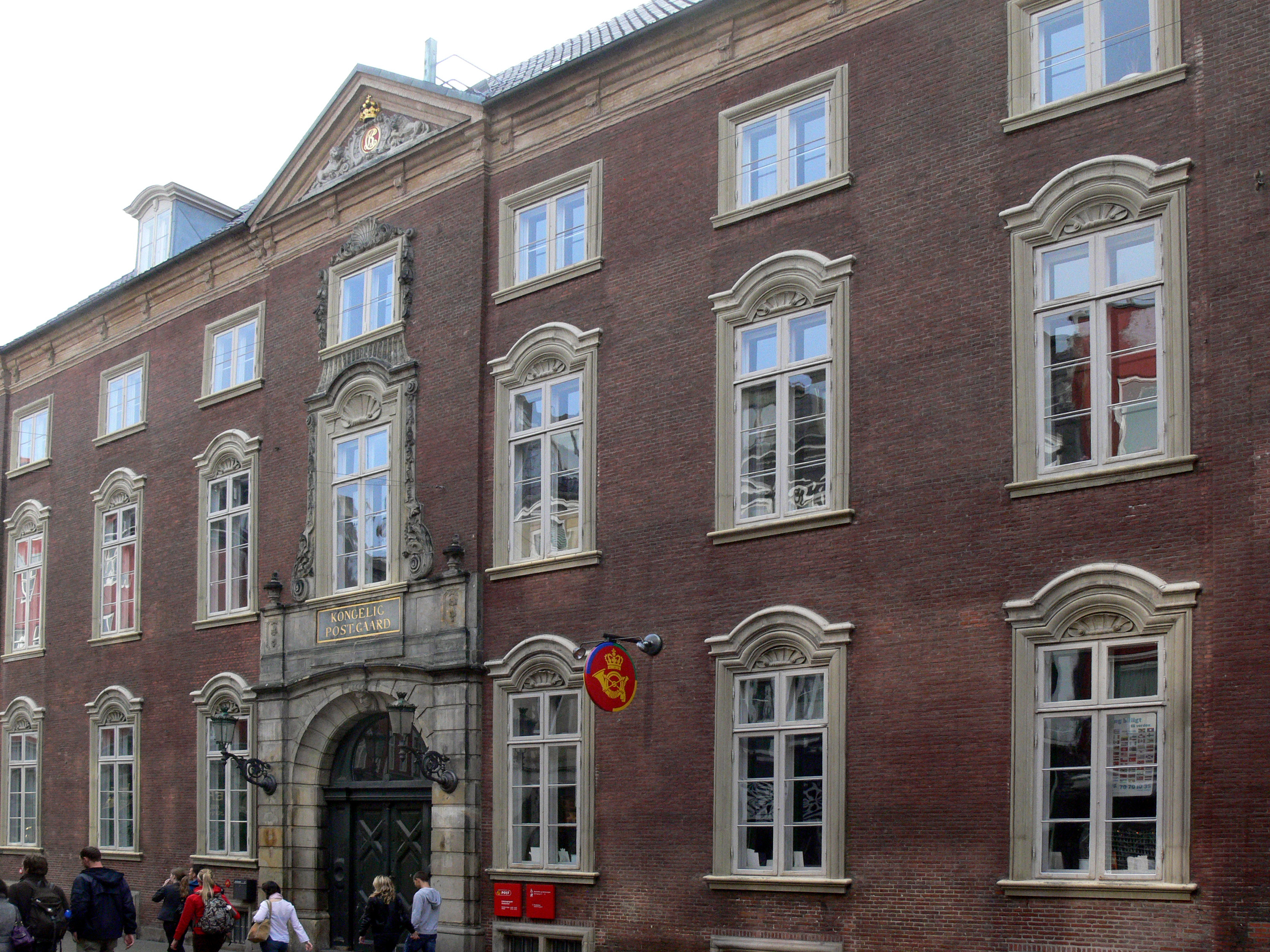
- Møinichen's Mansion today
- Interactive map of the Møinichen Mansion area

General information
- Architectural style: Baroque
- Location: Copenhagen, Denmark, Denmark
- Coordinates: 55°40′49.54″N 12°34′41.52″E
- Construction started: 1729
- Completed: 1733

Design and construction
- Architect: Philip de Lange/Felix Dusart

The Møinichen Mansion (Danish: Møinichen s Palæ) is a former town mansion on Købmagergade in central Copenhagen, Denmark. It later served as headquarters of Royal Danish Mail from 1779 until 1912 and was known as the Royal Mail House (Danish: Den Kongelige Postgård). Købmagergade Post Office (Danish: Købmagergade Postkontor), was located in the building until June 2015 while the Post & Rele Museum was located on the two upper floors from 1907 until 2015. The building was acquired by the PFA pension fund in December 2014 and is in use for both retail and offices.

== History ==
=== Early history ===
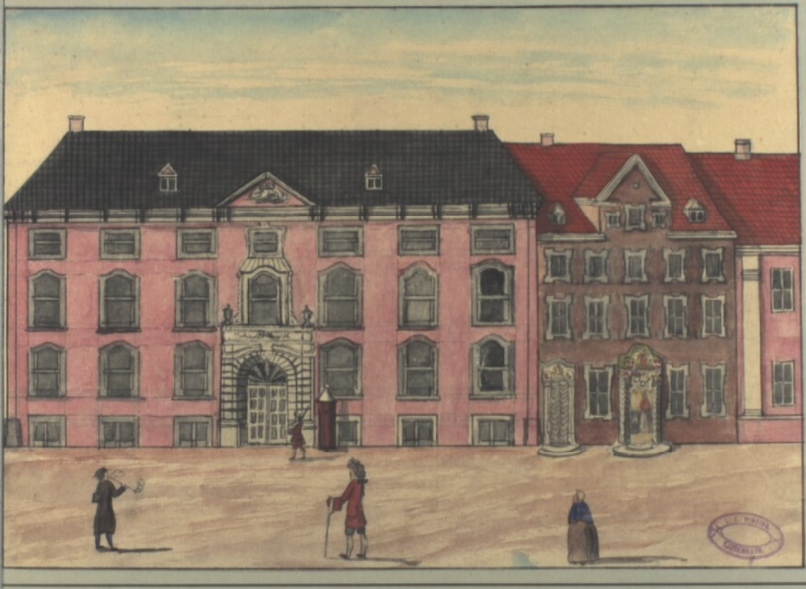
The Møinichen Mansion in 1749

The house was commissioned by Christian Møinichen, a protégé of King Frederick IV, who had been appointed as president of the Chancery in 1725. It was constructed by Philip de Lange but possibly to a design by Felix Dusart. Construction began in 1729 but when the king died the following year, Møinichen fell out of favour at the Court. He was charged with several cases of mismanagement, dismissed from all his posts without a pension and sentenced to return a large sum of money to the Treasury. By the time the mansion was completed in 1733, it had already changed hands several times. It was acquired by the king in 1734 and then briefly served as the residence of the lord chamberlain (lord marshall, hence its alternative name).

=== Royal Mail House ===
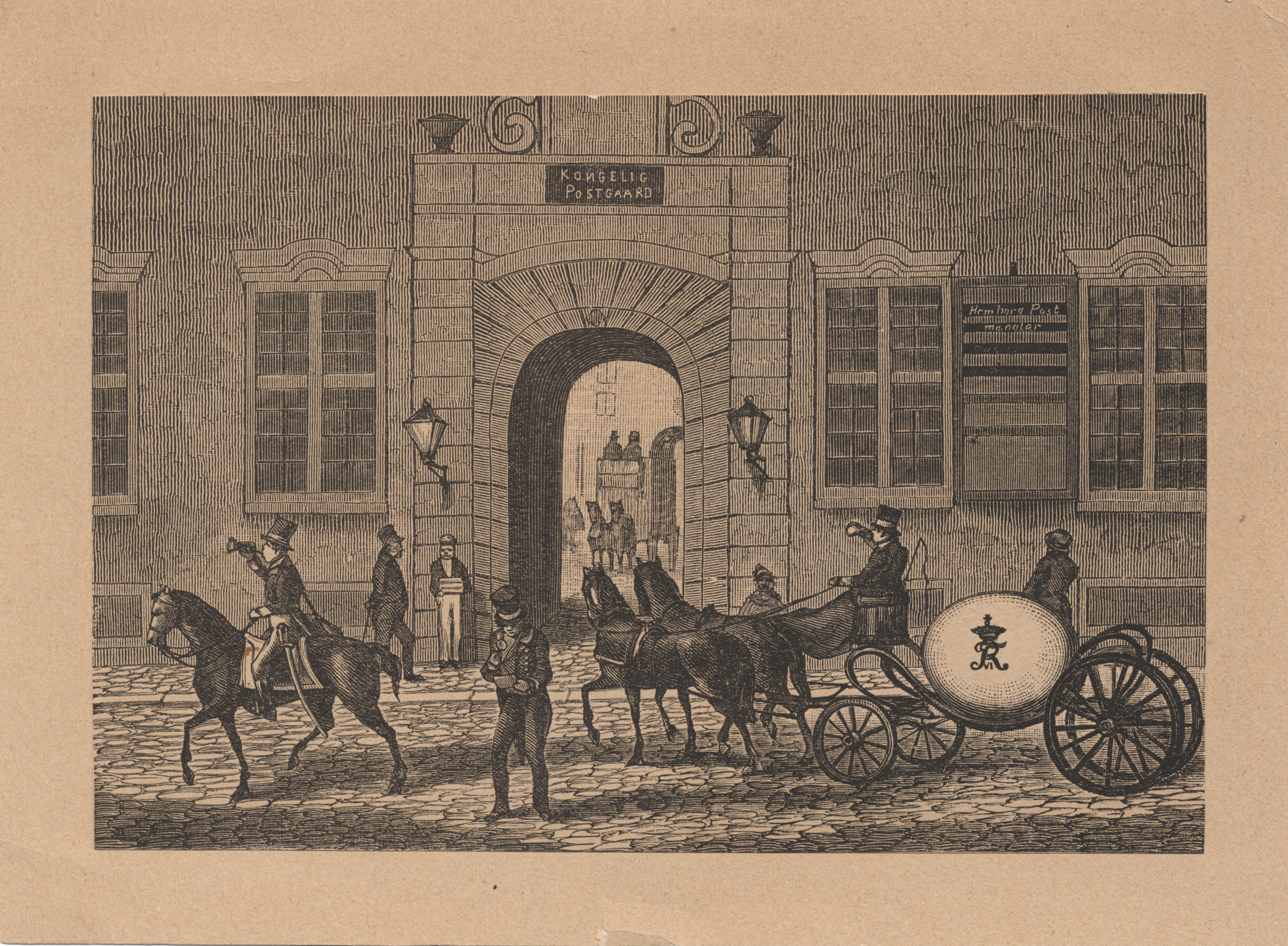
P. C. Klæstrup: Kugleposten kører ind på postgården i Købmagergade, Tidsskrift for Postvæsen, issue no. 2, 1880

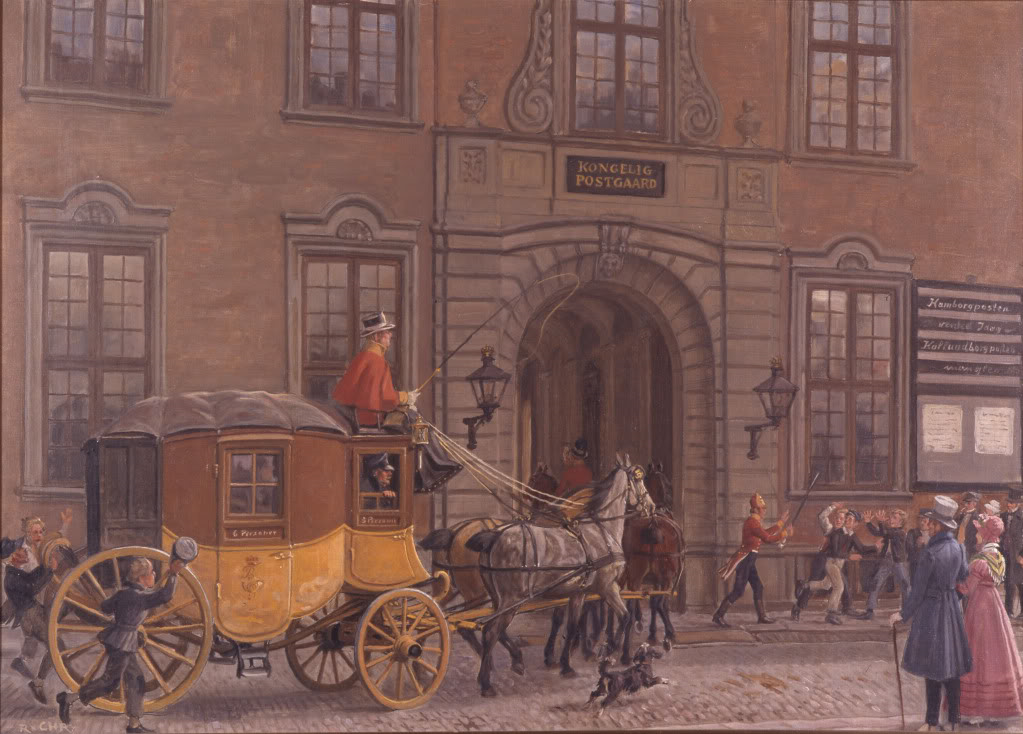
The mail coach from Hamburg outside the Mail House in Købmagergade, undated painting by Rasmus Christiansen

In 1779 it was adapted by Caspar Frederik Harsdorff to serve as Copenhagen's new Royal Mail House.Royal Postal Services had until then been based in another building on Køgmagergade which was now taken over by the Royal Porcelain Manufactury. Both enterprises were under the directorship of Johan Theodor Holmskjold.

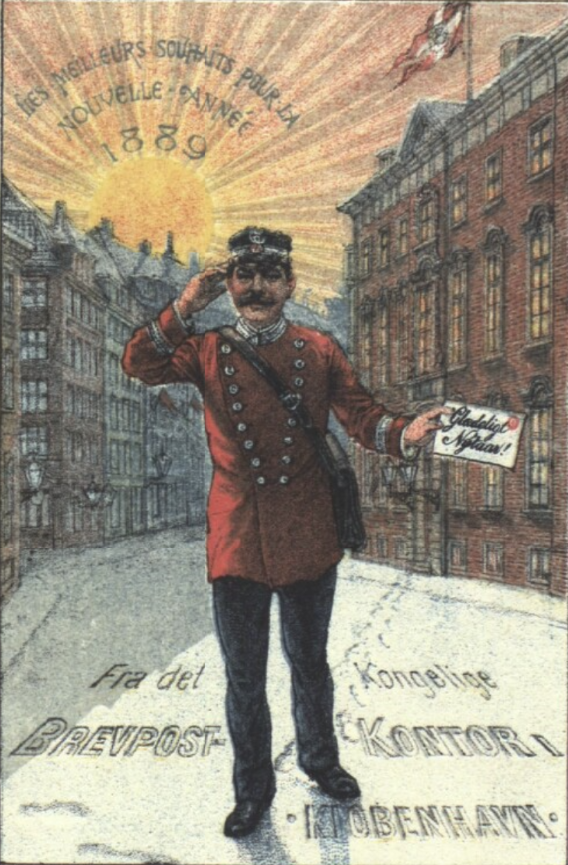
Advertisement from 1888

Open two-whealed mail coaches operated on Copenhagen-Hamburg from the 1780s. A yellow, egg-shaped mail coach operated between the Royal Mail Building and Hamburg from 1815. until 1865.

By the turn of the 20th century, the building had fallen into a state of disrepair and the location in the middle of the Old Town had also become still more inconvenient. For these reasons, it was decided to build a new a new headquarters next to the new Central Railway Station. The Copenhagen Central Mail Building was inaugurated in 1912. The building on Købmagergade continued to house a local post office for the city centre. A mail and telecommunications museum opened on the two upper floors of the complex in 1907.

In 2008, it was first announced that Post Danmark considered a sale of the building. PFA Pension acquired it in December 2014.

== Architecture ==
The oldest part of the building is designed in the Baroque style. The façade on Kønmagergade is seven bays wide with a 1-bay central projection topped by a small triangular pediment with Christian IX's monogram. The windows were originally sash windows, unusual in Denmark but also used on other buildings by Lange.

Andreas Clemmensen 's expansion from 1916 (No. 33-37), on the corner with Løvstræde, is eight bays wide and consists of two floors and a recessed mezzanine floor above a robust cornice. The façade is decorated with pilasters and has a three bay central projection under a triangular pediment.

The rear wing on Valkendorfsgade was designed by J. Th. Zeltner in a style similar to that of the main wing and is from is from 1875 to 1876.

== Current use ==
PFA Pension has commissioned Revco Property Development and Aarstiderne Arkitekter to undertake a renovation of the building which is expected to be completed media 2016. The principal tenants for the office space are Momondo (4800 square metres in the oldest part of the building) and Unity Technologies (4,400 square metres in the extension). The ground floor contains approximately 3,000 square metre retail space, with ARKET occupying most of the space.
