= Melbye =

Melbye is a surname. Notable people with the surname include:

- Anton Melbye (1818–1875), Danish painter and photographer
- Fritz Melbye (1826–1869), Danish marine painter
- Mads Melbye (born 1956), Danish epidemiologist
- Terje Melbye Hansen (born 1948), Norwegian sport shooter
- Vilhelm Melbye (1824–1882), Danish marine artist
