= Helsingør =

City in North Zealand, Denmark

Helsingør Elsinore
- City
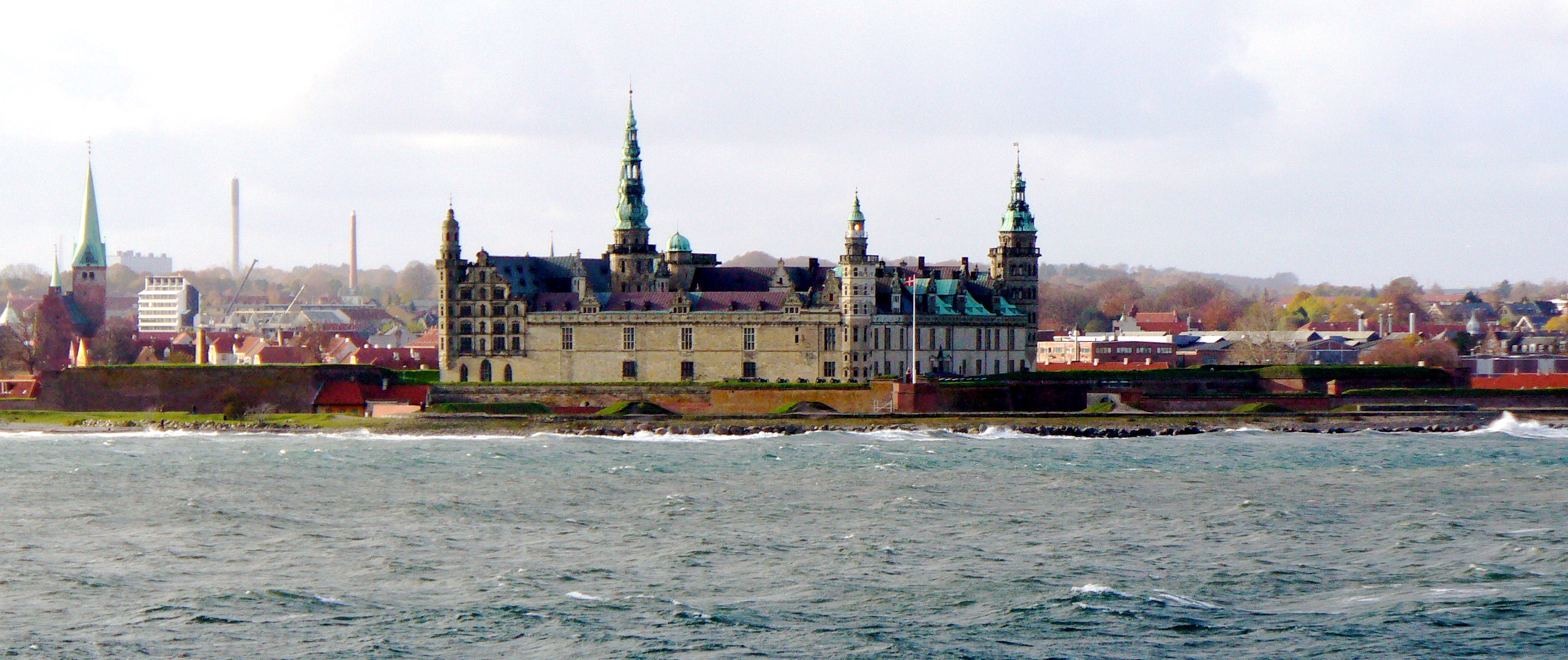
- Helsingør waterfront in November 2006, with Kronborg Castle

- Coat of arms

- Location in Denmark Helsingør (Capital Region)
- Coordinates: 56°02′10″N 12°36′30″E
- Country: Denmark
- Region: Capital (Hovedstaden)
- Municipality: Helsingør
- Established: 1420s
- City charter: 1426
- Current municipality: 2007-01-01

Government
  - Mayor: Benedikte Kiær

Area
  - Urban: 18 km^{2} (6.9 sq mi)
- Elevation: 8 m (26 ft)

Population (2026)
  - Urban: 48,450
  - Urban density: 2,639/km^{2} (6,830/sq mi)
  - Gender: 23,282 males and 25,168 females
- Demonym: Helsingoraner
- Time zone: UTC+1 (CET)
  - Summer (DST): UTC+2 (CEST)
- Postal code: 3000
- Area code: (+45) 49
- Website: helsingor.dk

Helsingør (/ˌhɛlsɪŋˈɜːr/ HEL-sing-UR, Danish: [helse̝ŋˈøɐ̯ˀ]; Swedish: Helsingör), also known in English as Elsinore (/ˈɛlsɪnɔːr, ˌɛlsɪˈnɔːr/ EL-sin-or, -OR), is a coastal city in northeastern Denmark. Helsingør Municipality had a population of 64,446 as of 10 July 2026. Helsingør is located at the narrowest part of the Øresund strait and together with Helsingborg in Sweden, forms the northern reaches of the Øresund Region, centred on Copenhagen and Malmö. Helsingør is a ferry city, with the frequent departures on the HH Ferry route, which connects Helsingør with Helsingborg, 4 km (2.5 mi) across the Øresund.

Its castle Kronborg was used by William Shakespeare as the setting for his play Hamlet.

== Etymology ==
The first part of the name, Hels, is believed to derive from the word hals 'neck; narrow strait', referring to the narrowest point of the Øresund (Øre Sound) between what is now Helsingør and Helsingborg in Sweden. The word Helsing supposedly means 'person/people who live by the neck' and ør corresponds to old Norse aurr 'gravel beach' and eyrr 'sandy or gravelly shore'. The city was first mentioned as Hælsingør and the people as Helsinger in King Valdemar the Victorious's Liber Census Daniæ from 1231 (not to be confused with the Helsings of Hälsingland in Sweden). Place names show that the Helsinger may have had their main fort at Helsingborg and a fortified landing place at Helsingør, to control the ferry route across the strait. The particularly 19th-century tradition to explain toponymies, place names, with features of the landscape does not necessarily exclude the much older tradition of reading place names as eponymous. Although an obscure legendary character, or several, Helsing is quite abundantly present in traces of lost legends in the Nordic countries.

Although probably not the first Helsing, one of the three sons of Gandalf Alfgeirsson (the antagonist of Halfdan the Black, who was father of King Harald Fairhair, the semi-legendary, historical first king of a feudalist Norway) is called Helsing. He was brother to Hake and Hysing Gandalfson. Also Helsinki in Finland and Hälsingland in Norrland, Sweden, refers to Helsing, as "the Land of the Helsing/Helsinger," which makes the landscape theory of the name of Helsingør less likely.

== History ==
Map of Helsingør and Kronborg Castle (c. 1725)

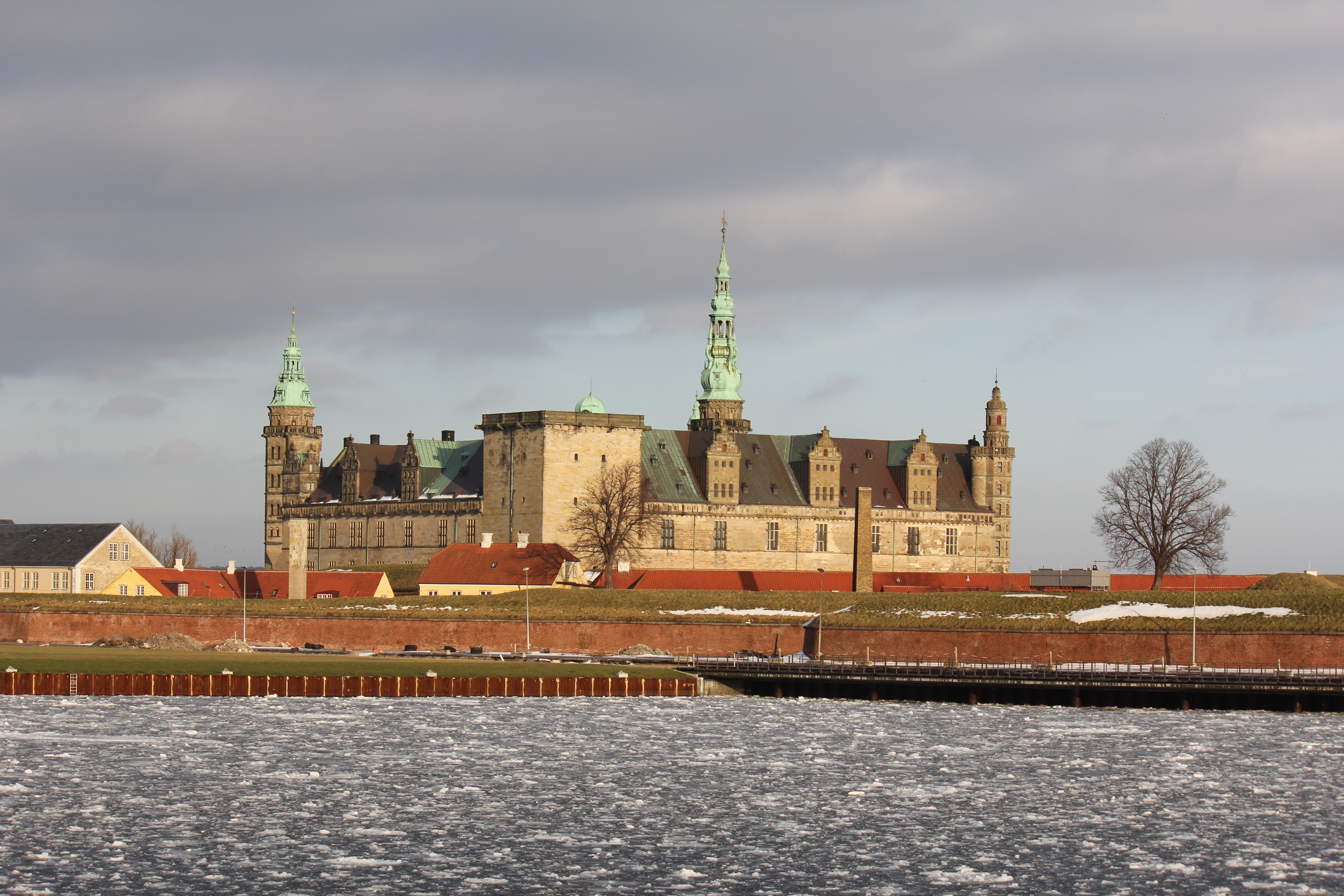
Kronborg Castle

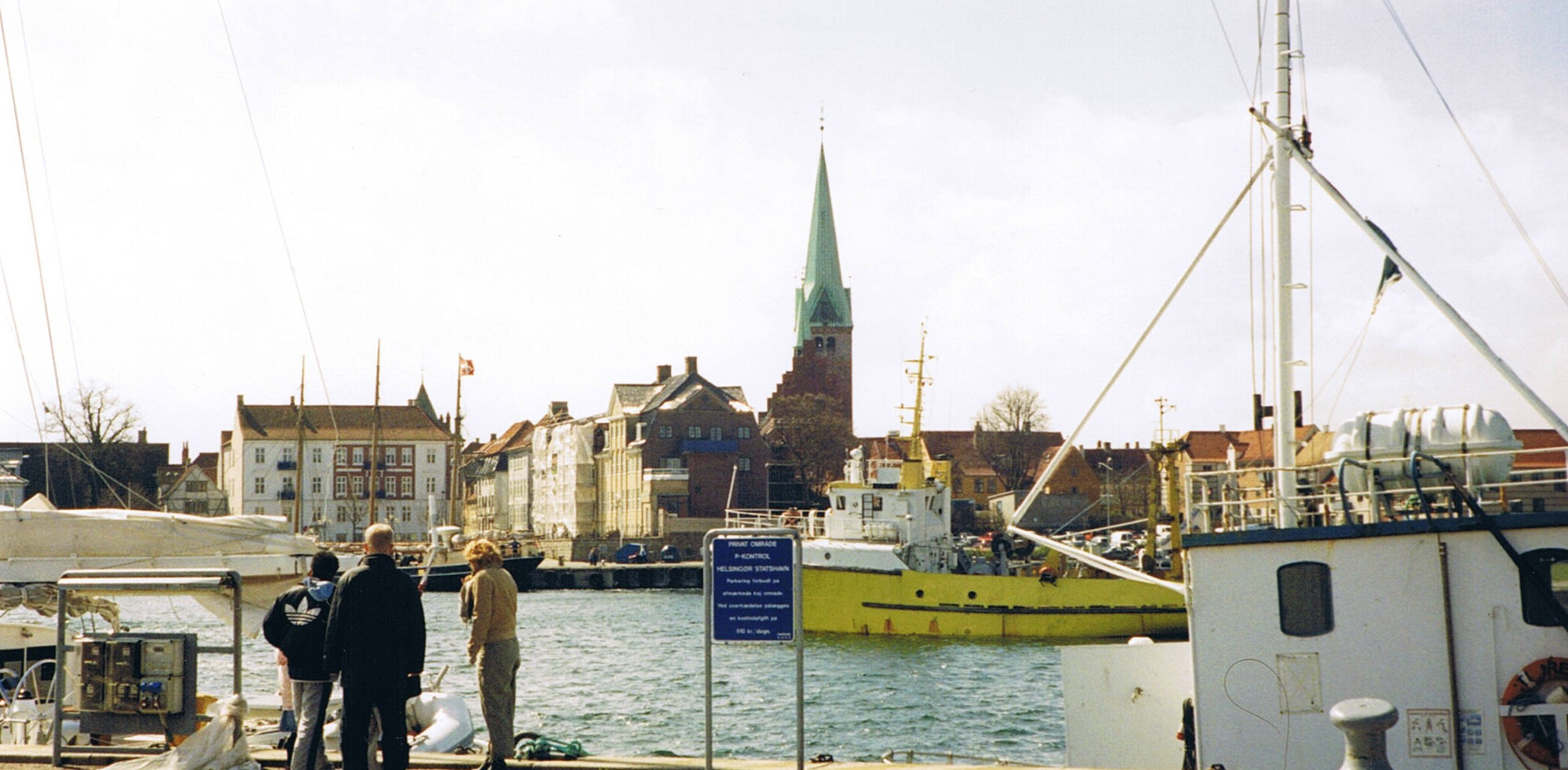
Helsingør port

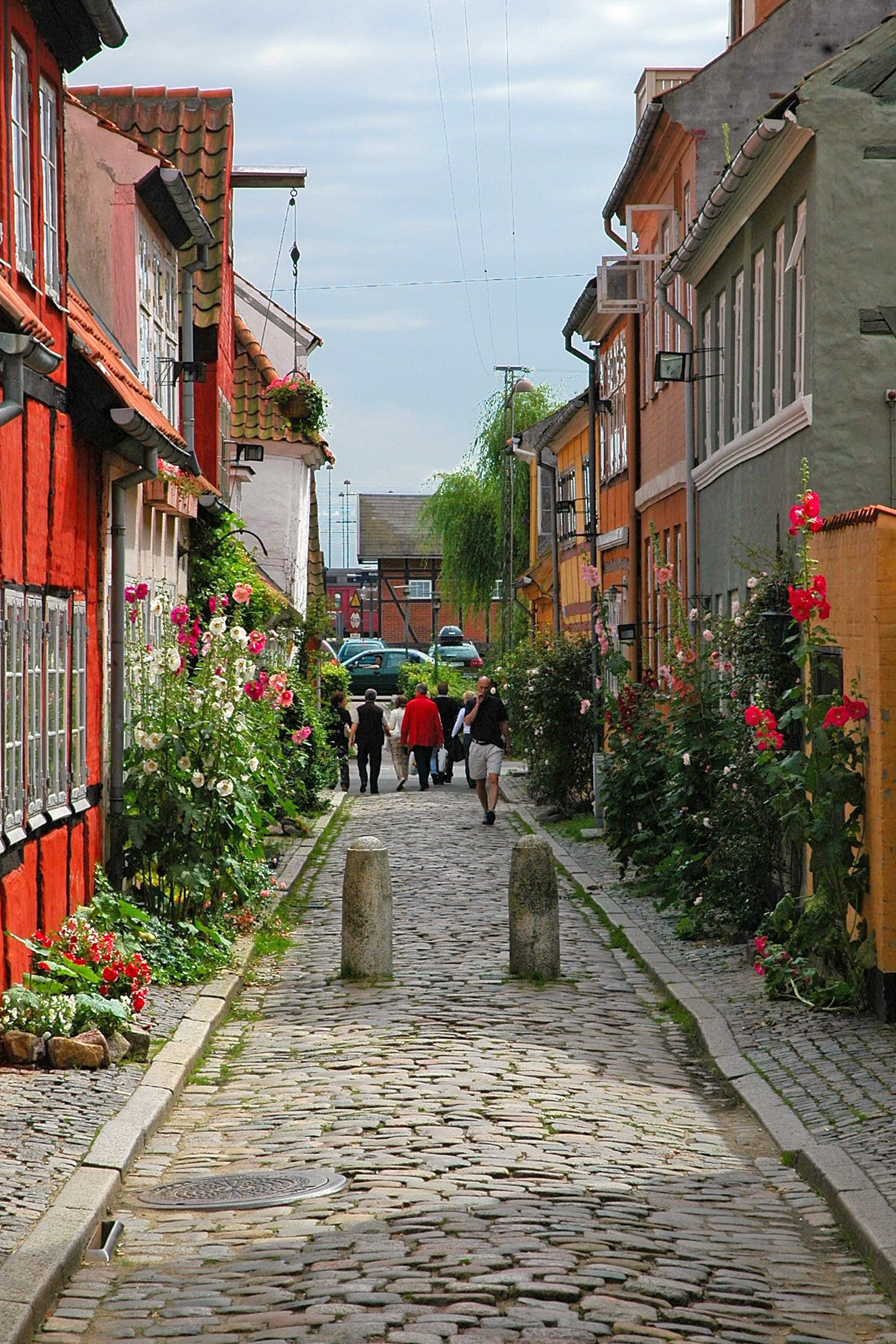
An alley in Helsingør

The city as it is known today was founded in the 1420s by Danish King Eric of Pomerania. He established the Sound Dues in 1429, which were a toll on the use of the Øresund. Although a different toll had existed before this one, the Sound Dues were paid in Helsingør, providing immense wealth to the city. With that income, the king built a castle named Krogen or Ørekrog on the extreme northeastern tip of the island of Zealand. The city expanded around the castle and envelops it today. Krogen was rebuilt and expanded in the 1570s by king Frederik II and renamed Kronborg. All ships had to stop in Helsingør to get their cargo taxed and pay a toll to the Danish Crown, which generated a significant income to the city, which in turn generated trade. The city's growing wealth further fuelled the growth of maritime transport through the Øresund Strait - from 1479 to 1581 the number of ships passing through the strait increased 6.5 times. In 1672, Helsingør had grown to be the third-largest town in Denmark. Up until the middle of the 19th century, Helsingør was among the largest cities in the country.

The Sound Dues were abolished in 1857 with the Copenhagen Convention in which all seafaring nations agreed to pay a one-time fee. The abolishment was a huge loss for the city and the following decades saw a slow growth in population.

The oldest known fortified building of Helsingør is Flynderborg, an early medieval fortress on a hill just south of the medieval city.

Around 1200, the first church, Saint Olaf's Church, was built.

A number of convents once surrounded the church, but now all that remains is the church building, today the cathedral of the Diocese of Helsingør. The oldest parts of the cathedral of Helsingør date back to the 13th century and show that the fishing village, as Helsingør was then, had grown to become a town of importance.

Johan Isaksson Pontanus (Rerum Danicarum Historica, 1631) attributes a long and partially-fictitious history to Helsingør.

During World War II, Helsingør was among the most important transport points for the rescue of Denmark's Jewish population during the Holocaust. Adolf Hitler had ordered that all Danish Jews were to be arrested and deported to the concentration camps on Rosh HaShanah, the Jewish New Year, which fell on 2 October 1943. When Georg Ferdinand Duckwitz, a diplomatic attaché of Nazi Germany to Denmark, received word of the order on 28 September 1943, he shared it with political and Jewish community leaders. Using the name Elsinore Sewing Club (Danish: Helsingør Syklub) as a cover for messages, the Danish population formed an Underground Railroad of sorts that moved Jews away from the closely watched Copenhagen docks to spots further away, especially in the north of Sjælland, including Helsingør, situated just two miles across the Øresund to Helsingborg, in neutral Sweden. Hundreds of civilians hid their fellow Danish Jewish citizens in their houses, farm lofts and churches until they could board them onto Danish fishing boats, personal pleasure boats and ferry boats. Over the course of three nights, Danes had smuggled over 7,200 Jews and 680 non-Jews (family members of Jews or political activists) across the Øresund to safety in Helsingborg and Malmö in Sweden.

== Transport ==
The car ferry line between Helsingør and Helsingborg, Scania, Sweden is the busiest in the world with more than 70 departures in each direction every day. The route is known as the HH Ferry route and has been sailed by several shipping lines throughout history. The Helsingør ferry terminal is connected to the town's main railway station. From the station, trains depart to Copenhagen every 20 minutes. Trains also depart to Hillerød and Gilleleje. There are another six stations or train stops within the city and connected suburbs. Apart from Helsingør Station and Ferry Terminal also Snekkersten, Espergærde, Mørdrup and the train stops on the line to Gilleleje, Grønnehave, Marienlyst and Højstrup.

The E47 motorway towards Copenhagen begins just outside the city limits. The town and surrounding areas also have a network of local and regional buses.

A tunnel between Helsingør and Helsingborg in Sweden, the HH-tunnel is in the early planning stage.

== Industrialisation ==
For a century the Helsingør Værft or Elsinore shipyard was a prominent landmark, which covered the whole area between the town and Kronborg Castle. It was founded in 1882. At its height in 1957, it had 3,600 employees. The last ship left the shipyard in 1983 and it closed the same year following substantial losses.

The Wiibroe brewery, founded in 1840, was the second brewery in Denmark to ship bottled beer, just three years after Carlsberg. The last beer was brewed at Wiibroe in Helsingør in 1998. Carlsberg continues to brew beer under the Wiibroe Årgangsøl label.

== Post-industrialisation ==
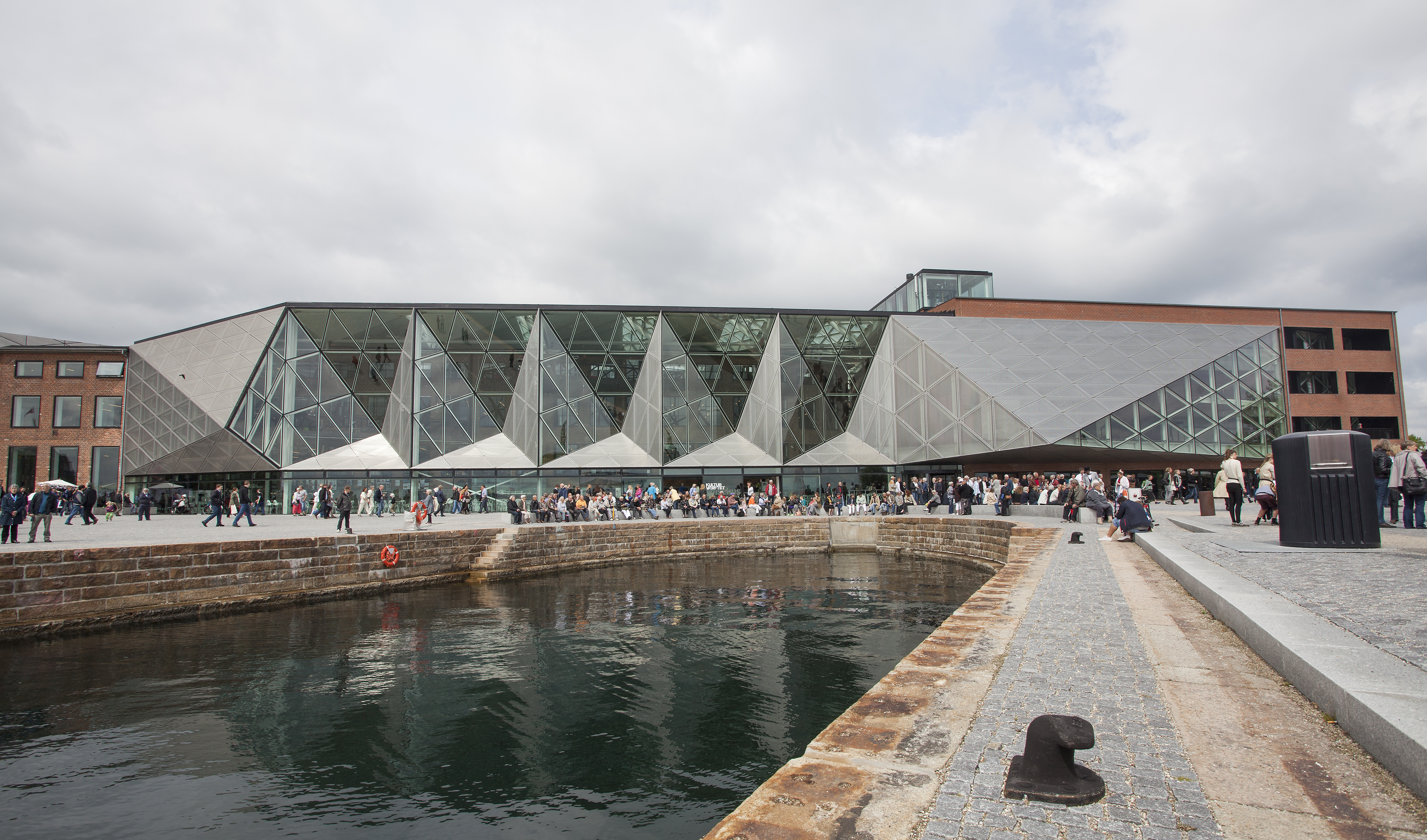
Culture Harbour Kronborg

After the end of the industrial era, the town of Helsingør had to redefine itself, and came up with an ambitious project: Kulturhavn Kronborg, literally "Culture-harbour of Kronborg". It officially opened on 26 May 2013, intended to appeal to tourists with an interest in culture. The main attraction of Kulturhavn Kronborg is Kronborg Castle, a UNESCO World Heritage Site. Besides the historical attractions of the site, William Shakespeare's play Hamlet has been performed annually in its courtyard since 1937. There is a longstanding tradition of performing the play in English, and notable actors in the title role have included Laurence Olivier, John Gielgud, Christopher Plummer, Derek Jacobi, and in 2009 Jude Law. At the heart of Kulturhavn Kronborg lies kulturværftet or The Culture Yard, a new cultural centre and a public library located in the old dockyard. It opened in 2010. The former dry dock now houses the Danish Maritime Museum.

In the centre of the harbour basin stands the polished steel sculpture Han (He) by artist duo Elmgreen and Dragset, commissioned by the City of Helsingør in 2012. It was inaugurated by then Minister of culture, Uffe Elbæk, in June 2012. It is seen as the counterpart (and even little brother) to Edvard Eriksen's world-famous The Little Mermaid statue in Copenhagen, and has caused both praise and protests among locals.

The Swedish city of Helsingborg lies a short distance across the Øresund from Helsingør, approximately 4 km (2 mi). European route E55 joins the two cities; ferries connect the two sides.

== Music ==
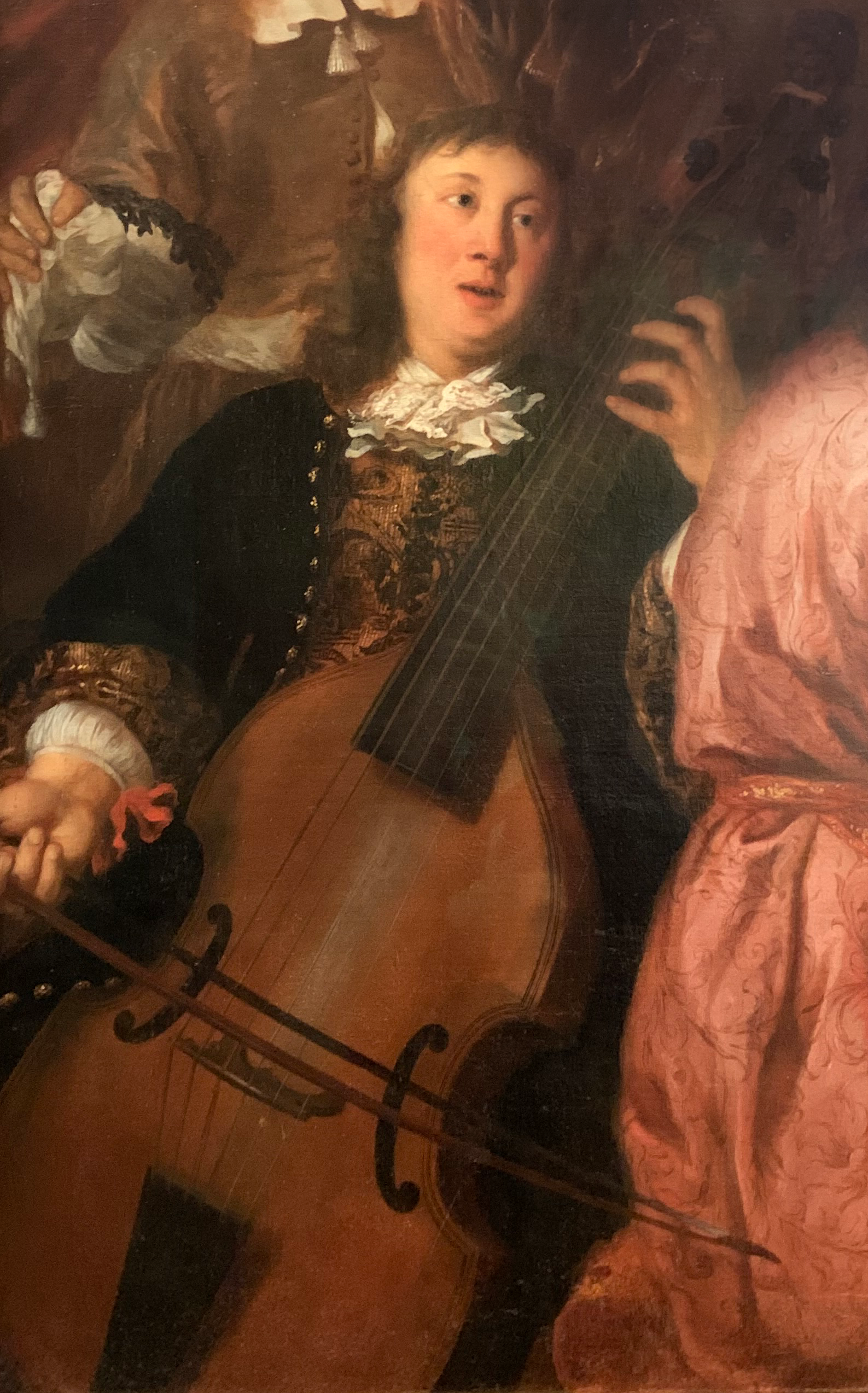
Buxtehude playing a viol

Dieterich Buxtehude was an organist and composer of the Baroque period. Presumably born in Helsingborg, he serving as organist from 1660 to 1668 in Helsingør like his father who held the position of organist at St. Olaf's cathedral. Diderich Buxtehude's compositions and style became of significant influence, among others, on his student Johann Sebastian Bach.

== Architecture ==
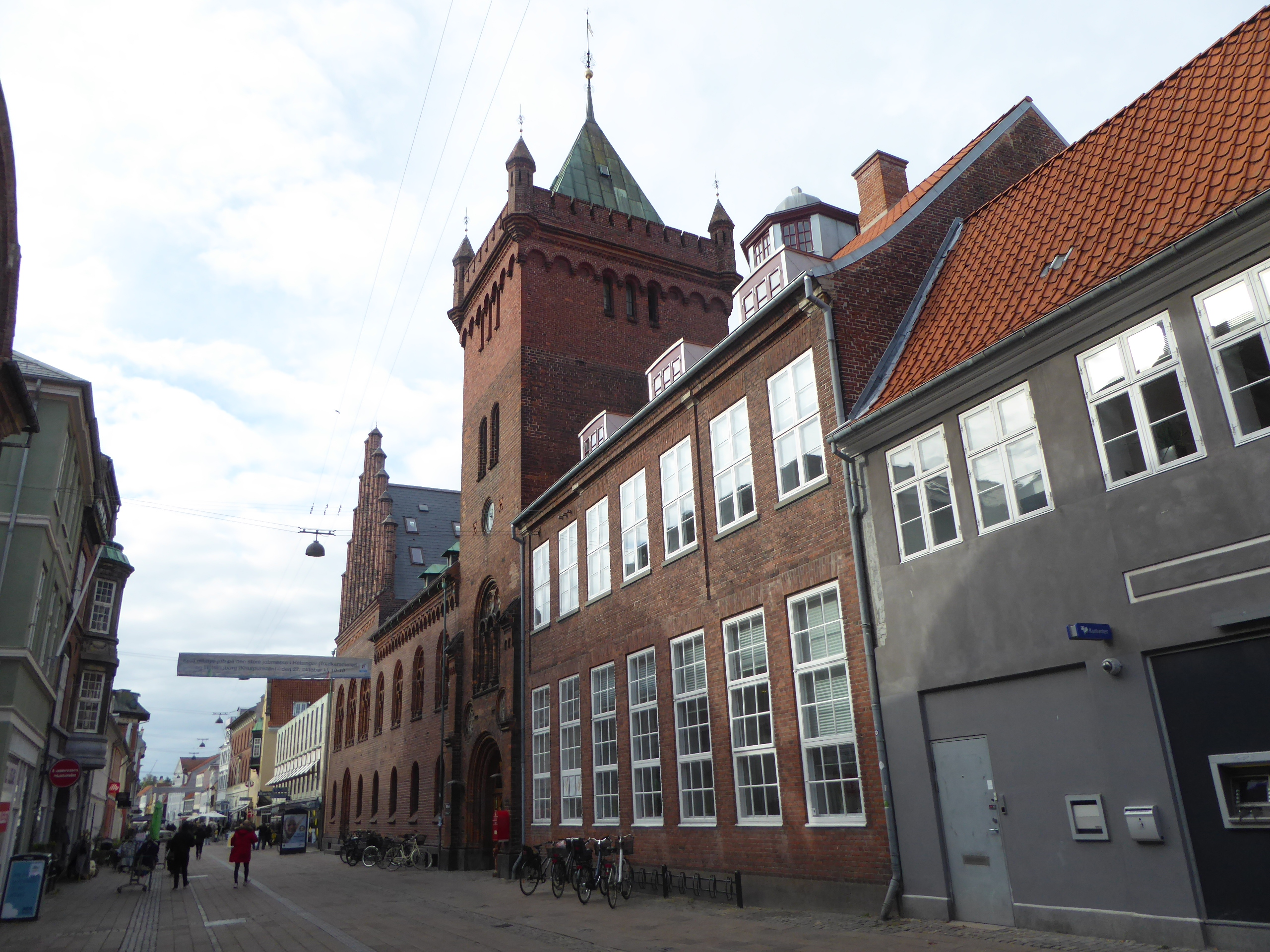
Helsingør City Hall

The new Danish Maritime Museum was designed by Danish prize-winning architects Bjarke Ingels Group (BIG).

Jørn Utzon lived in Helsingør in his youth because his father was an engineer at Helsingør Værft. Utzon designed : His own house (1952), The Kingo Houses (1956–60) and The Hammershøj Care Centre (1962) in the city. The project was completed by Birger Schmidt (1966) after Utzon moved to Sydney to work on the Sydney Opera House.

== Notable people ==
=== Public service ===
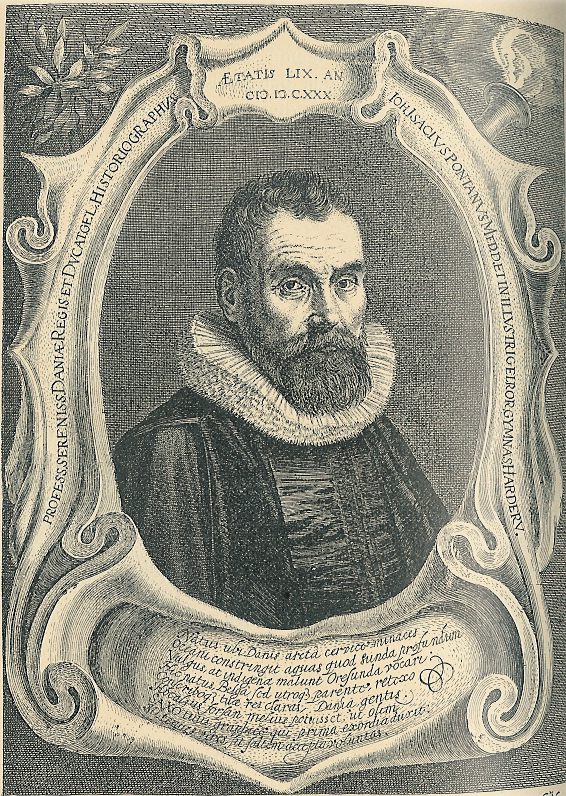
Johan Isaksen Pontanus

- Christiern Pedersen (c.1480–1554), canon, humanist scholar, writer and publisher
- Johannes Isacius Pontanus (1571–1639), Dutch historiographer.
- Niels Claussøn Senning (c.1580–1617), Danish/Norwegian clergyman, Bishop of Oslo
- Hans Ulrik Gyldenløve (1615–1645), illegit. son of King Christian IV of Denmark and Navy officer
- Jørgen Iversen Dyppel (1638–1683), first governor of the Danish West Indies 1672/1680.
- Christian de Meza (1792–1865) commanded the Danish Army in the Second Schleswig War
- Robert Cleaver Chapman (1803–1902), pastor, teacher and evangelist, the apostle of Love
- Olivia Nielsen (1852–1910), a Danish trade unionist and politician
- Hans Wright (1854–1925), city architect in Copenhagen from 1904 to 1925
- William Thalbitzer (1873–1958), a philologist and professor of Eskimo studies
- Morten Løkkegaard (born 1964), Danish politician and MEP.

=== Arts ===
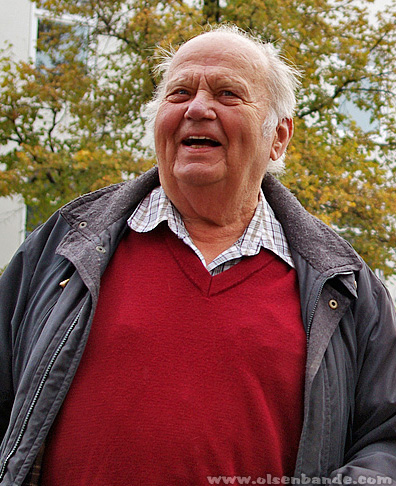
Ove Verner Hansen 2013

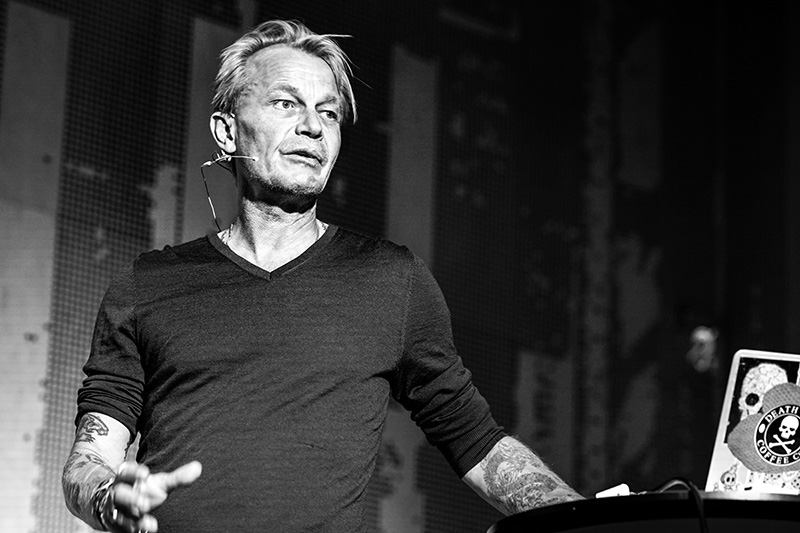
Jan Grarup, 2017

- Pieter Isaacsz (1569–1625), a Danish-born Dutch Golden Age painter.
- Bernhard Keil (1624–1687), Danish Baroque painter, became a pupil of Rembrandt.
- Johan Frederik Møller (1797–1871), Danish painter and photographer.
- Anton Melbye (1818–1875), Vilhelm Melbye (1824–1882) & Fritz Melbye (1826–1869), brothers and Danish marine artists
- August Schiøtt (1823–1895), Danish portrait painter.
- Peter Elfelt (1866–1931), photographer and cinema pioneer, made early Danish films
- Harald Moltke (1871–1960), a painter, author and explorer on four Arctic expeditions
- Alfred Lind (1879–1959), cinematographer, screenwriter and silent era film director
- Valdemar Andersen (1889–1956), screenwriter and film director for Nordisk Film
- Ove Verner Hansen (1932–2016), Danish opera singer and actor
- Erik Wedersøe (1938–2011), a Danish actor, director and author
- Birte Tove (1945–2016), a Danish actress
- Morten Rudå (born 1960), a Norwegian actor
- Fredrik Lundin (born 1963), jazz saxophonist and bandleader, brought up in Helsingør
- Martin Glyn Murray (born 1966), a Danish-born British actor
- Jan Grarup (born 1968 in Kvistgaard), a photojournalist, does war and conflict photography
- Helle Fagralid (born 1976), Danish actress of Faroese descent
- Vicki Berlin (born 1977), a Danish actress
- Susanne Grinder (born 1981), principal dancer with the Royal Danish Ballet

=== Science and business ===
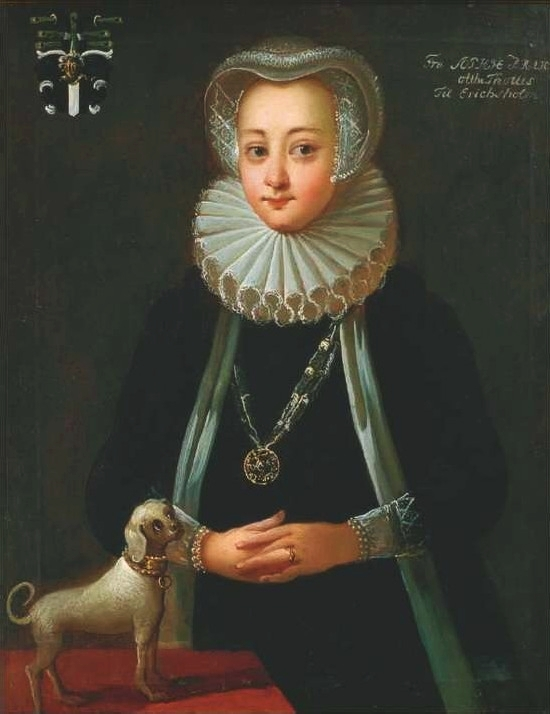
Sophie Brahe, 1602

- Sophia Brahe (1559–1643), a Danish noble woman and horticulturalist with knowledge of astronomy, chemistry, and medicine; lived in Helsingør from 1616
- Stephen Hansen (1701–1770), industrialist, businessman and General War Commissioner
- Jean Abraham Grill (1736–1792), merchant, director of the Swedish East India Company.
- Hans Christian Amberg (1749–1815), a Danish lexicographer
- Hartvig Marcus Frisch (1754–1816), director of the Royal Greenland Trading Department
- Sir Edward Knox (1819–1901), Danish-born Australian politician, sugar refiner and banker.
- Ludvig Lorenz (1829–1891), physicist and mathematician, named the Lorenz gauge condition
- Jens Levin Tvede (1830–1891), a Danish distiller, industrialist and politician; member of Helsingør City Council from 1857 and of the Landstinget
- Gordon Norrie (1855–1941), Danish surgeon and ophthalmologist, named Norrie disease
- Wilhelm Johannsen (1857–1927), Danish botanist, plant physiologist and geneticist
- Simon Spies (1921–1984), Danish tycoon.
- Steen Rasmussen (born 1955), a physicist, works on artificial life and complex systems
- Mette Blomsterberg (born 1970), Danish pastry chef, restaurateur and cookbook writer

=== Sport ===
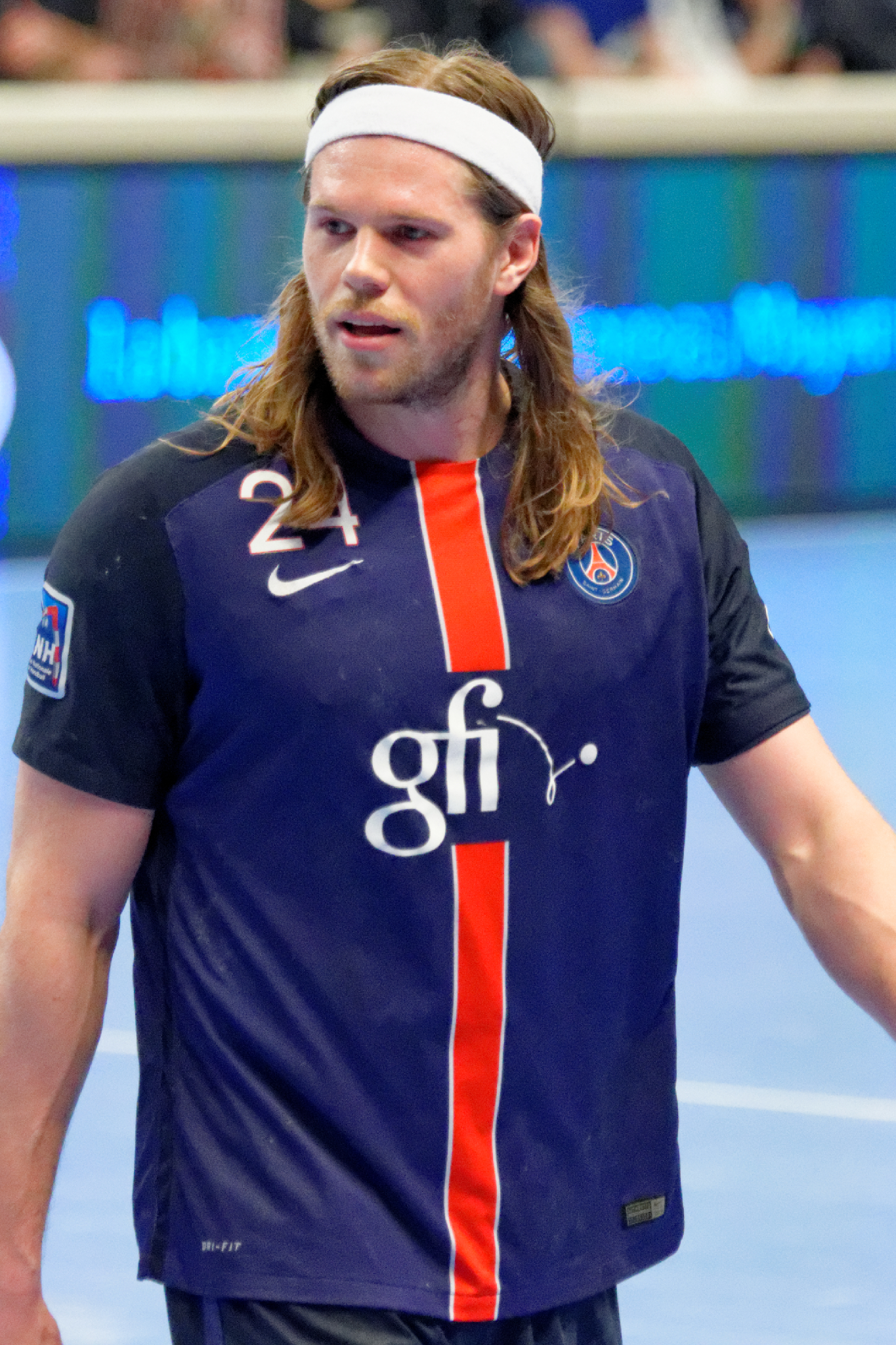
Mikkel Hansen, 2016

- Fairfax Fenwick (1852–1920), a New Zealand cricketer
- Edgar Aabye (1865–1941), a Danish athlete and journalist, team gold medallist in the tug of war at the 1900 Summer Olympics
- August Sørensen (1896–1979), track and field athlete, competed in the 1920 Summer Olympics
- Willy Hansen (1906–1978), a Danish track cyclist, silver medallist at the 1924 Summer Olympics and gold and bronze medallist at the 1928 Summer Olympics
- Jørn Steffensen (born 1944), a modern pentathlete, competed at the 1968, 1972 and 1976 Summer Olympics
- Mads Vibe-Hastrup (born 1978), Danish professional golfer
- Tobias Mikkelsen (born 1986), a footballer with over 250 club caps and 8 for Denmark
- Mikkel Hansen (born 1987), handball player who won the IHF World Player of the Year 2011, 2015, 2018
- Henrik Kronborg (born 1970), Danish handball coach

== Districts ==
Centrum

- North: Grønnehave (Green Gardens), Højstrup and Marienlyst, Hellebæk, Ålsgårde and Hornbæk
- West: Sundparken, Grøningen, Nøjsomheden, Vapnagård, Gurre, Nygård, Tikøb
- South: Skotterup and Snekkersten and Espergærde

== Twin towns – sister cities ==
Helsingør practices twinning on the municipal level. For the twin towns, see twin towns of Helsingør Municipality.

== In fiction and popular culture ==
- William Shakespeare's play Hamlet (whence the English spelling "Elsinore" derives) takes place mostly at Kronborg Castle in Helsingør.
- In the 1983 comedy Strange Brew, which is loosely based on Hamlet, the protagonists are given jobs at Elsinore Brewery.
- In Patrick O'Brian's Aubrey–Maturin series, Helsingør fires mortar shells at the heroes in book seven, The Surgeon's Mate, as they sail past on their way to a rendezvous in the Baltic.
- In the second chapter of Philip Roth's novel Our Gang (1971), Trick E. Dixon in a fictive speech tries to claim Helsingør as US-territory and tries to convince the audience to occupy the area.
- In Bret Easton Ellis's novel Lunar Park, the street on which the character Bret Easton Ellis lives, with his own haunting father-son issues, is called Helsingør Lane.
- Several stories written by the Danish author Karen Blixen (or Isak Dinesen) take place in Helsingør, including "The Supper at Elsinore" in her first published volume of stories, Seven Gothic Tales.
- A well-known poem by the Portuguese surrealist poet Mário Cesariny is named "You Are Welcome to Helsingør".
- Children's author Richard Scarry depicted Helsingør as "A Castle in Denmark" in the book Busy, Busy World.
- Indie-rock band The Essex Green recorded a song titled "Elsinore" for their 2006 album Cannibal Sea.
- In David Brin's novel The Postman, the first chapter features an apparition that appears to protagonist Gordon Krantz. It is described as an "Elsinorian figure" and greets Gordon with "Alas, poor Gordon!", both allusions to Hamlet.
- Surrealist artist René Magritte has a painting named after the city, depicting a castle, which might be modelled on Elsinore Castle.
- The detective show The Sommerdahl Murders is set in Helsingør

== See also ==
- Ålsgårde
- Carmelite Priory, Helsingør
- Elsinore municipality
- Hellebæk
- Tourism in Denmark
