= Kulturværftet =

Cultural centre in Helsingør, Denmark

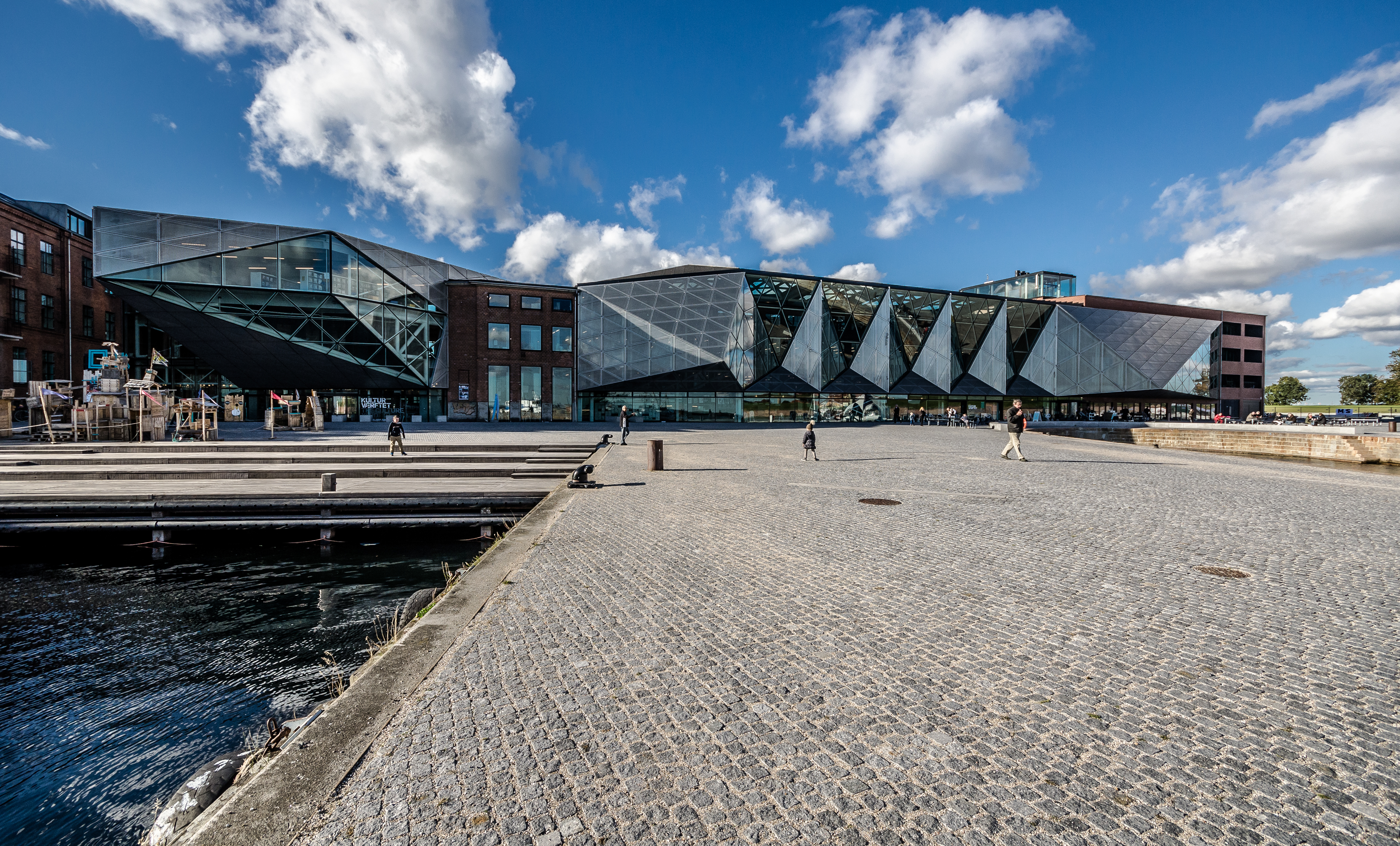
- Interactive map of Kulturværftet
- Location: Helsingør, Denmark
- Coordinates: 56°02′17″N 12°36′54″E
- Public transit: Helsingør station

Construction
- Opened: 2010

Website
- Kulturværftet

Kulturværftet (English: The Culture Yard) is a cultural centre located in Helsingør, Denmark.

The center was established in 2010, in the buildings of the former Helsingør Værft or Elsinore Shipyard. Kulturværftet is part of Kulturhavn Kronborg, a project by the city of Helsingør to leave the industrial era behind and enter a new chapter for the town.

Kulturhavn Kronborg is a joint initiative between Kronborg Castle, the Danish Maritime Museum, Kulturværftet, and Helsingør harbour, and is designed to offer a variety of cultural experiences to residents and visitors.

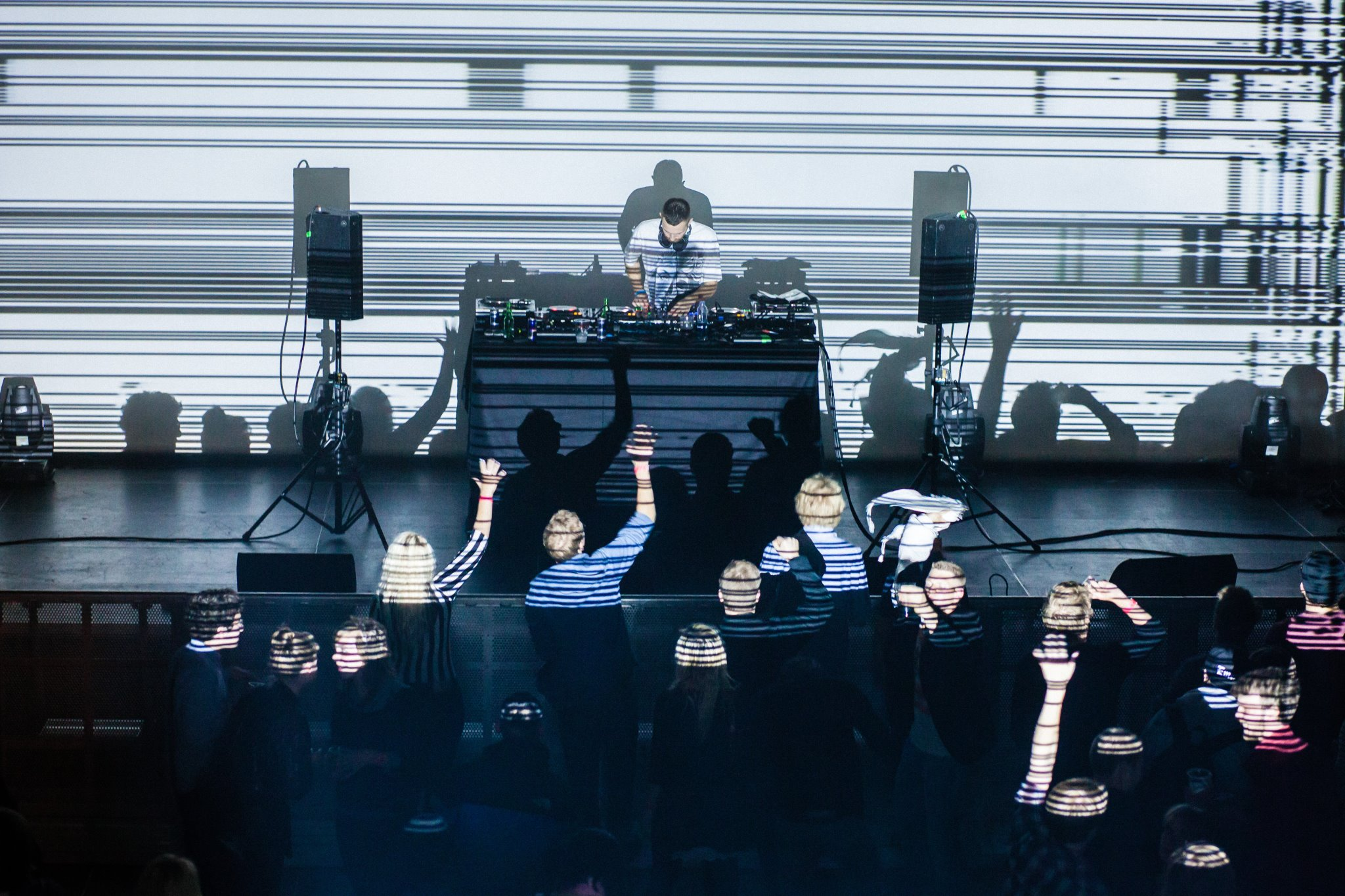
Clickfestival at The Culture Yard

Kulturværftet consists of 13,000 m^{2} (140,000 sq ft) of space dedicated to concerts, theatre, performance, events and exhibitions.

Recent notable events include hosting the annual Clickfestival, various performances during PASSAGE Festival and hosting the INDEX: Award Ceremony
