= Kulturhavn Kronborg =

Area in Helsingør, Denmark

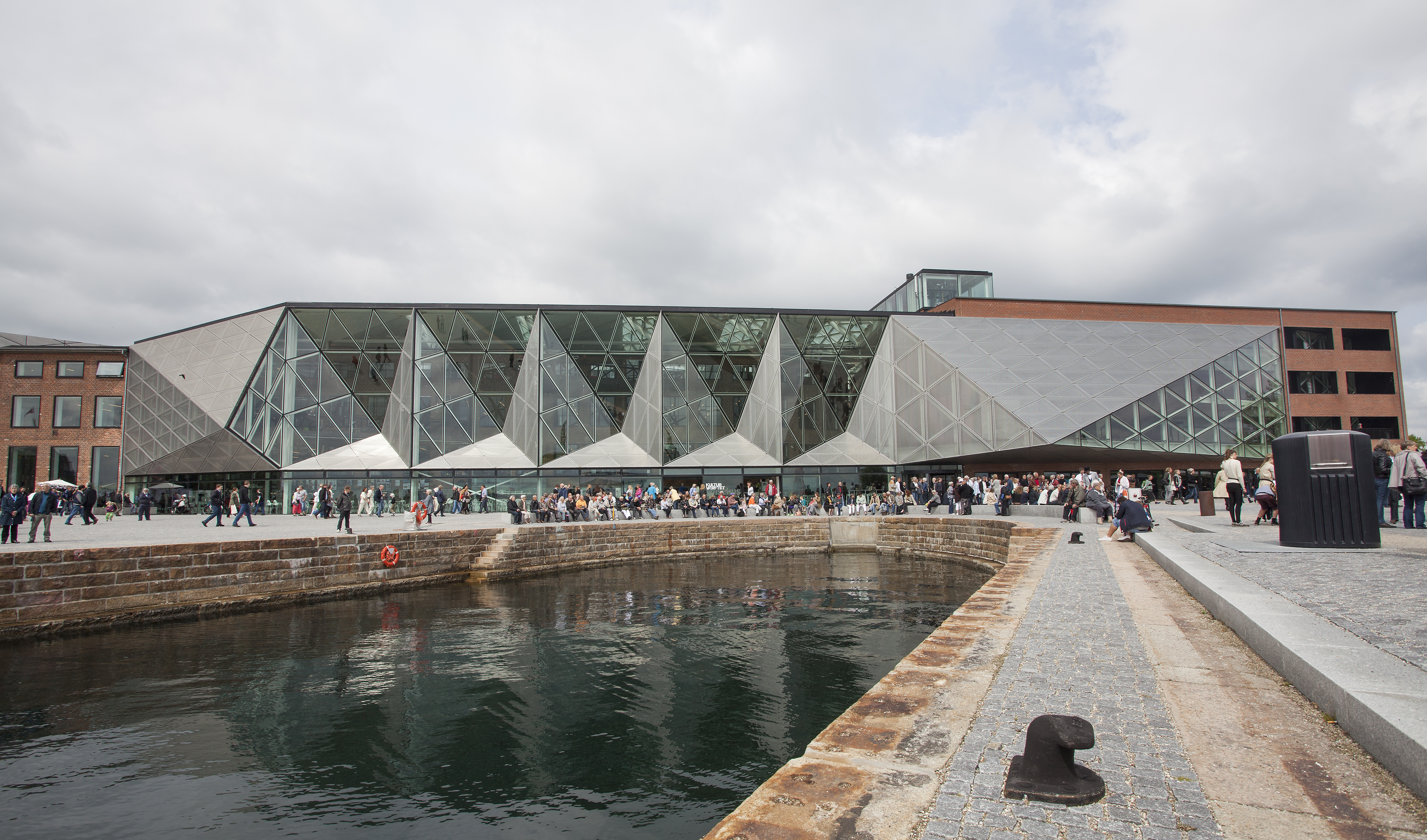
- Kulturhavn Kronborg

- Denmark
- Location: Helsingør, Denmark
- Coordinates: 56°2′16.22″N 12°36′52.74″E
- Type: Culture center
- Public transit: Helsingør station

Construction
- Opened: May 2013

Website
- Kulturhavn kronborg

Kulturhavn Kronborg is an area in the harbour of Helsingør dedicated to culture and events, designed to attract residents and visitors. It is a joint initiative by Kronborg Castle, the Danish Maritime Museum, Kulturværftet (The Culture Yard) and Helsingør harbour, and was opened in May 2013.

Kulturhavn Kronborg is the culmination of an ambitious project by the city of Helsingør to leave the industrial era behind and enter a new chapter for the town. This was achieved first, with the establishment of the Kulturværftet in 2010, in the buildings of the former Helsingør Værft (Elsinore Shipyard), and subsequently, with the opening of the Danish Maritime Museum in the summer of 2013, in the neighbouring dry dock.

The main attraction to Kulturhavn Kronborg is the Kronborg Castle, a UNESCO World Heritage Site. In the centre harbour basin the Town of Helsingør has commissioned a statue by the artist duo, Elmgreen and Dragset, with the title, han, installed in 2012.

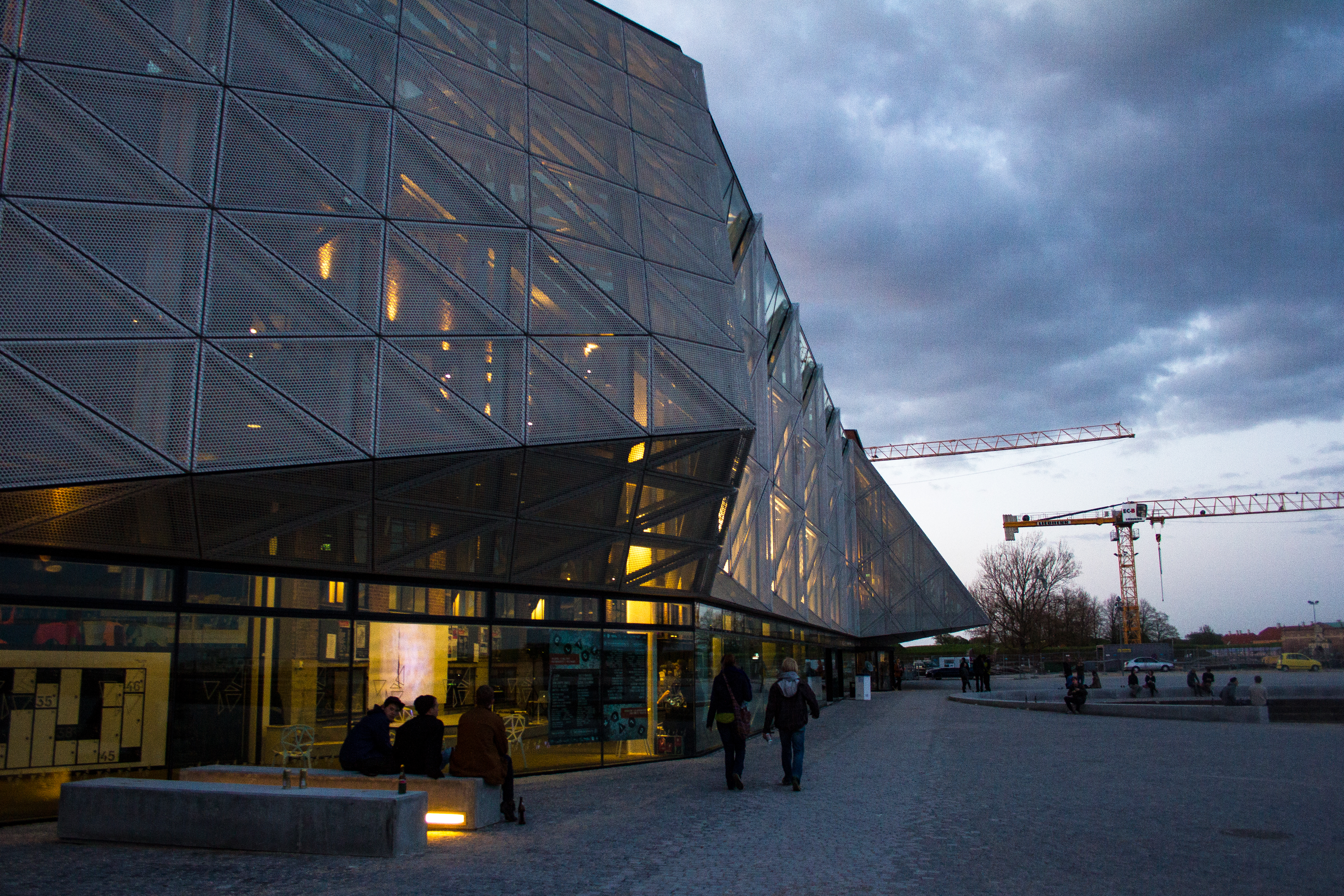
Kulturværftet
