= M/S Maritime Museum of Denmark =

Maritime museum in Helsingør, Denmark

- M/S Museet for Søfart
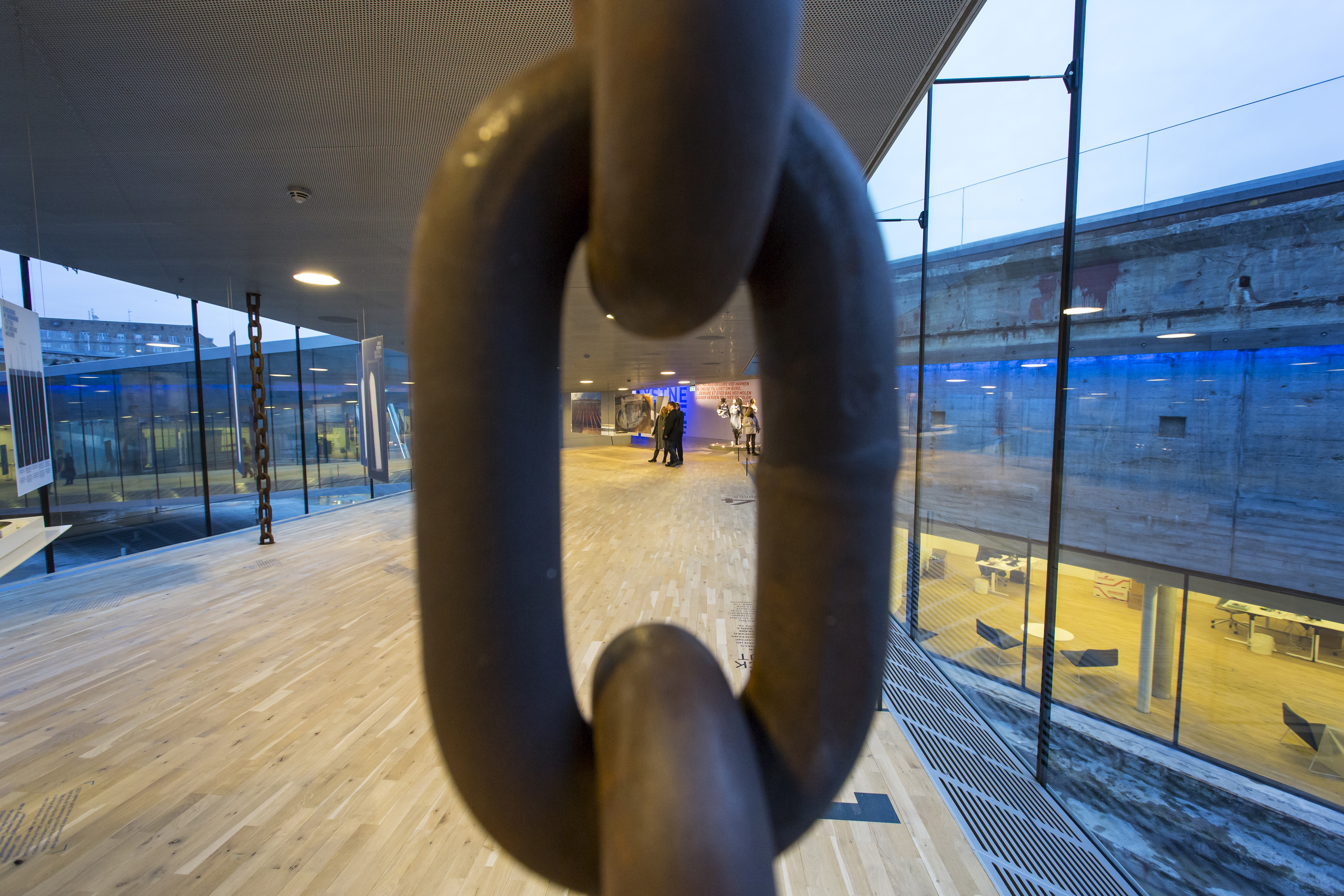
- Interior of the museum (2014)
- Former name: Danish Maritime Museum
- Established: 1915
- Location: Helsingør, Denmark
- Coordinates: 56°02′21″N 12°36′56″E
- Owner: Self-governing institution
- Website: mfs.dk

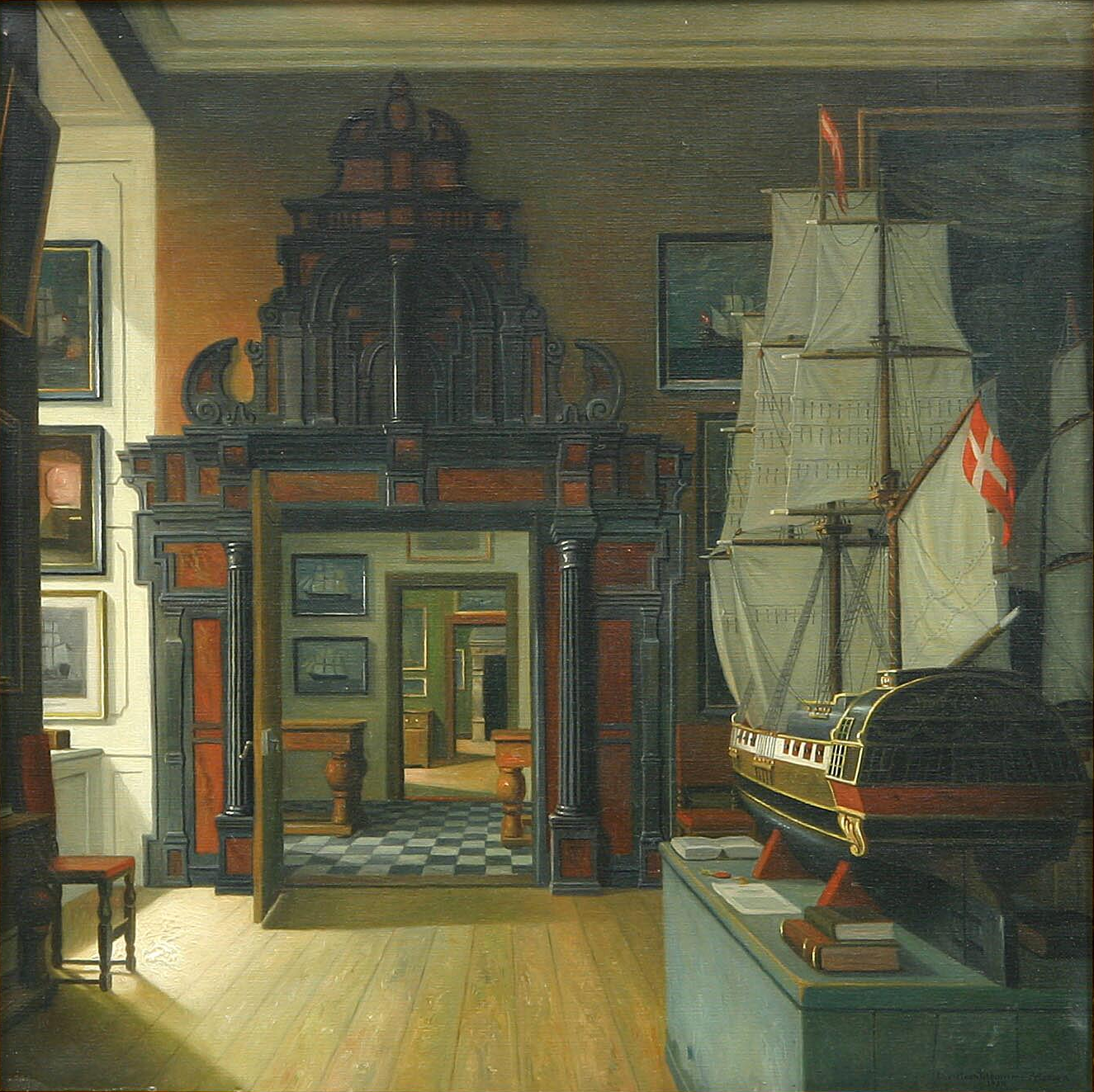
Interior from the museum at Kronborg in 1920. Painting by Christian Tilemann-Petersen.

The M/S Maritime Museum of Denmark (Danish: M/S Museet for Søfart) is a maritime museum located in Helsingør, Denmark. Established in 1915, its collections cover Danish trade and shipping from the 15th century to the present day.

The museum was originally located at Kronborg Castle. In 2013, the museum moved into new underground premises designed by Bjarke Ingels Group (BIG) around a former dry dock. Until 31 December 2011, the museum was known as Handels- og Søfartsmuseet (literally "The Trade and Maritime Museum"), which was officially translated as the Danish Maritime Museum.

== Description ==
Model ships, paintings, photographs and related artifacts illustrate the Napoleonic Wars as well as Danish trade with China and India. Special exhibitions are devoted to navigation, the Danish lifeboat service, lighthouses, shipbuilding, and the sailor's life since the 16th century. The museum also has several thousand paintings, a collection of over 33,000 photographs illustrating virtually all Danish ships since 1880, and a library of 20,000 volumes.

== New museum ==
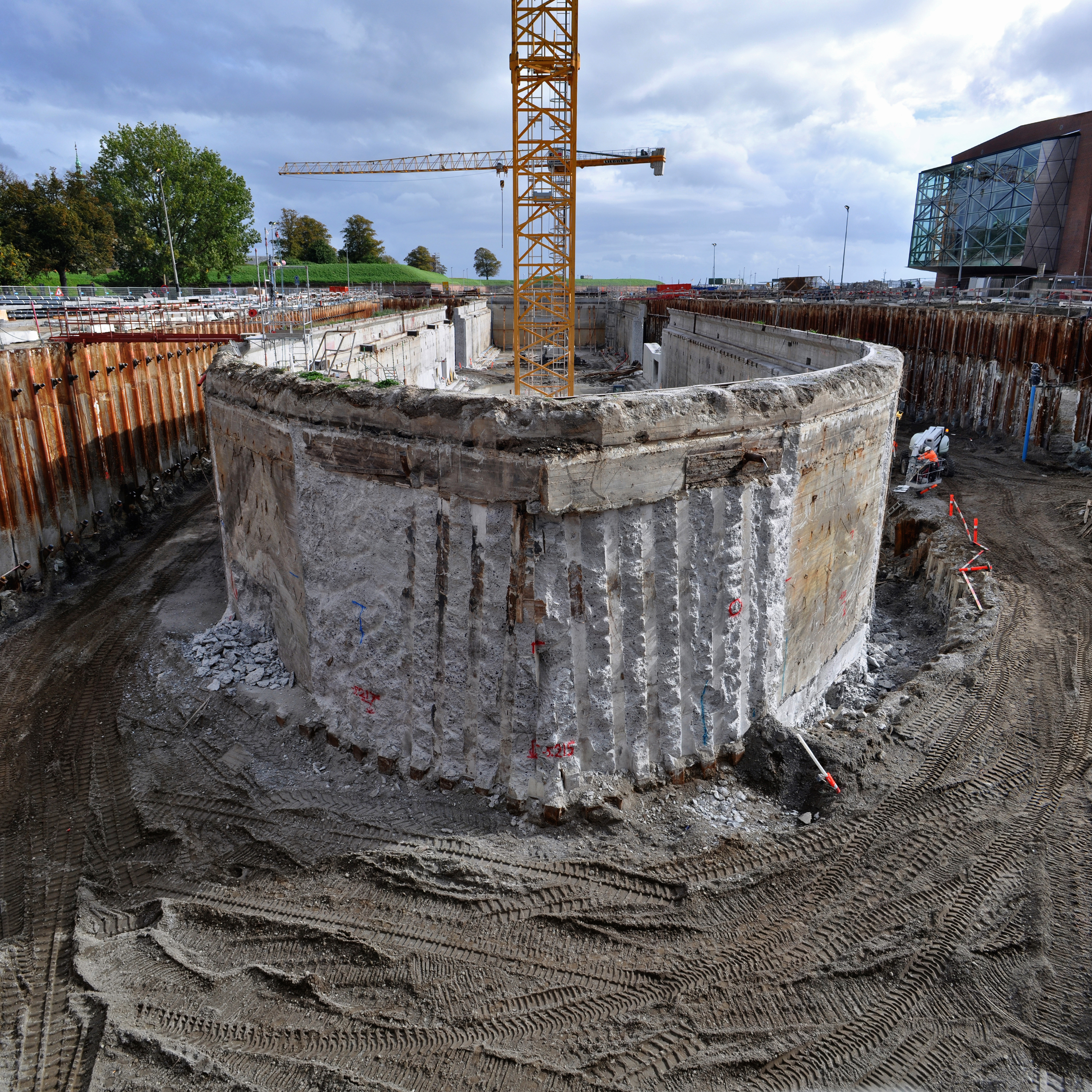
Construction of the new museum, September 2011

A new museum designed by Bjarke Ingels Group (BIG) opened in October 2013. Located in a former Helsingør dry dock, it is placed in an underground area of 7,600 square metres (82,000 sq ft) with an interior designed by Dutch architects Kossmann.dejong. Equipped with teaching facilities, workshops and a café, the museum also hosts conferences and cultural events.

BIG's decision to build underground was the result of height restrictions imposed on the design in order to protect the viewshed of nearby Kronborg. The old dry dock, 150 metres (490 ft) long, 25 metres (82 ft) wide and 9 metres (30 ft) deep, proved to be an ideal location but it was first necessary to reinforce the old dock walls before constructing the museum on its periphery. The dock itself will remain an empty space crossed by ramps and bridges providing access to the museum and the exhibition areas. The overall intention is to give the museum the feel of a ship's deck. The competition jury welcomed the proposal, believing it would create a world-class maritime museum for Denmark. Financed by 11 foundations, construction work began in September 2008 and the museum finally was opened on 5 October 2013.

== Awards ==
- Architizer A+ Award
- 2014 RIBA EU Award
- 2014 WAF Award (Culture category)
- The design magazine Frame, has ranked the exhibition #2 on a list of the 10 Best New Exhibition Designs.

== Culture Harbour Kronborg ==
Kulturhavn Kronborg is an effort of 2013 to offer a variety of culture experiences to residents and visitors to Helsingør. Kulturhavn Kronborg is a joint initiative by Kronborg Castle, Danish Maritime Museum, kulturværftet and Helsingør harbour.
