= Skotterup =

Neighbourhood in Helsingør, Denmark

Coordinates: 56.0086°N 12.5897°E

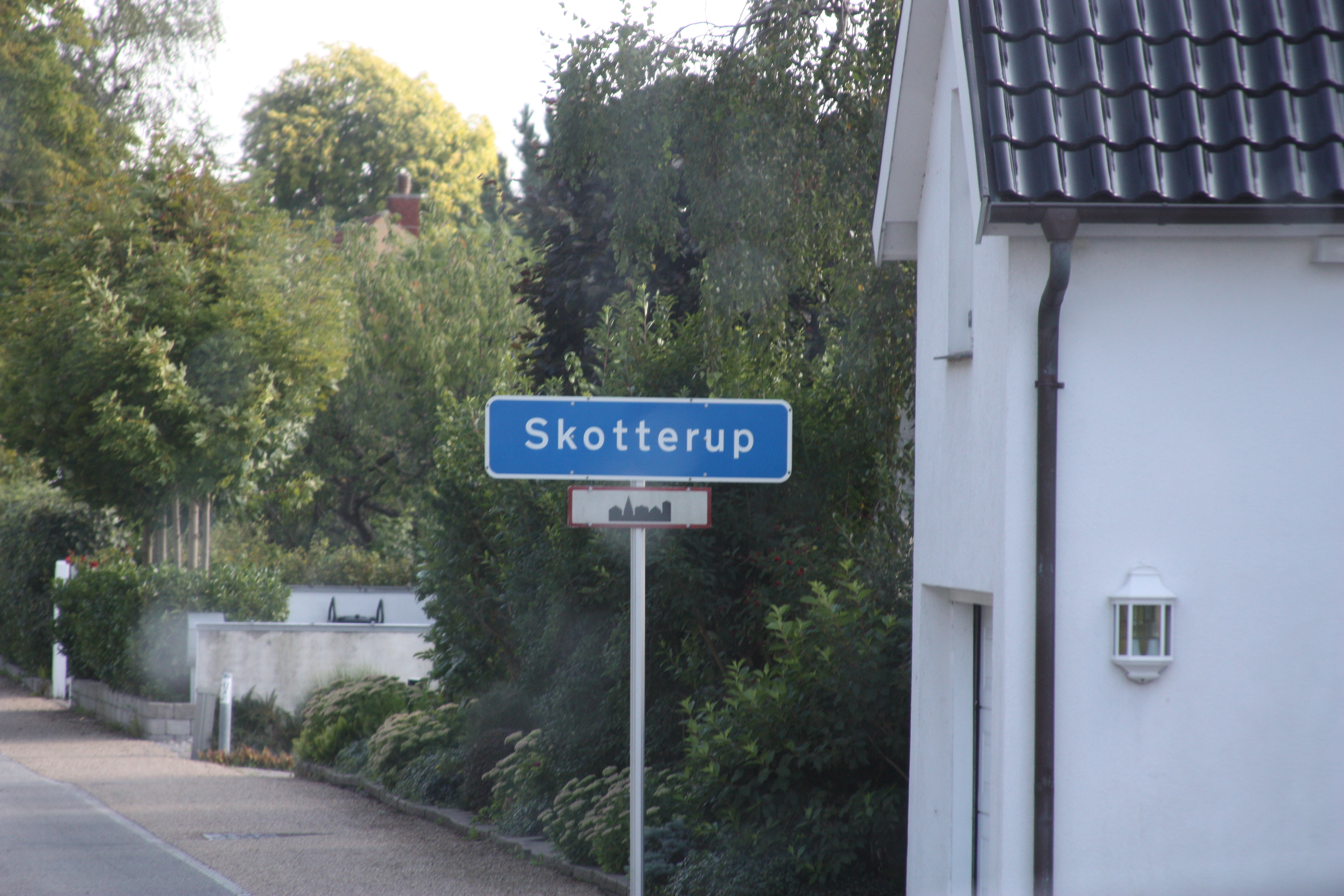
Skotterupvej

Skotterup is a former village and current neighbourhood located in the southern part of Helsingør, Denmark. It is located between Snekkersten to the north and Espergærde to the south and belongs to Snekkersten postal district (3070, Snekkersten).

Skotterup consists of an approximately 100 metres long stretch of the Strandvejen coastal road. It is located approximately 200 metres south of Snekkersten station. The name is mostly associated with the small Skotterup Beach, the road Skotterupvek and Skotterup Inn (Skotterup Kro). The King's Vase (Kongevasen), a landmark installed by the fishermen who brought passengers from the steam ferries ashore, is still seen on the beach.

== History ==
Skotterup was originally a small fishing village but it is unclear when it was founded. Land records (Markbøger) from the parish of Tikøb mentions the locality in the form "Skotterups Hus" (Skotterup's House), indicating that it at this point only consisted of a single house. The suffix -rup refers to a settlement established by people who have left another village. It is usually seen in much older place names, indicating that Skotterup may have a history that goes back much longer. One possibility is that the rest of the village was destroyed during the Swedish Wars. It is also unclear whether the first part of the name refers to a Scotsmen—Helsingør was home to a sizeable Scottish colony—or to the male given name Skopte. Efterleddet -rup, betyder. A baptism in Skotterup is for the first time mentioned in church records from Tikøb parish in 1701. The records go back to 1683 and list many baptisms for neighbouring settlements in the period 1683–1700. At the census in 1771, Skotterup consisted of nine families. In 1787, it had grown to 11 families with a total of 37 family members. Most of the residents were fishermen. By 1834m the population had grown to 110.

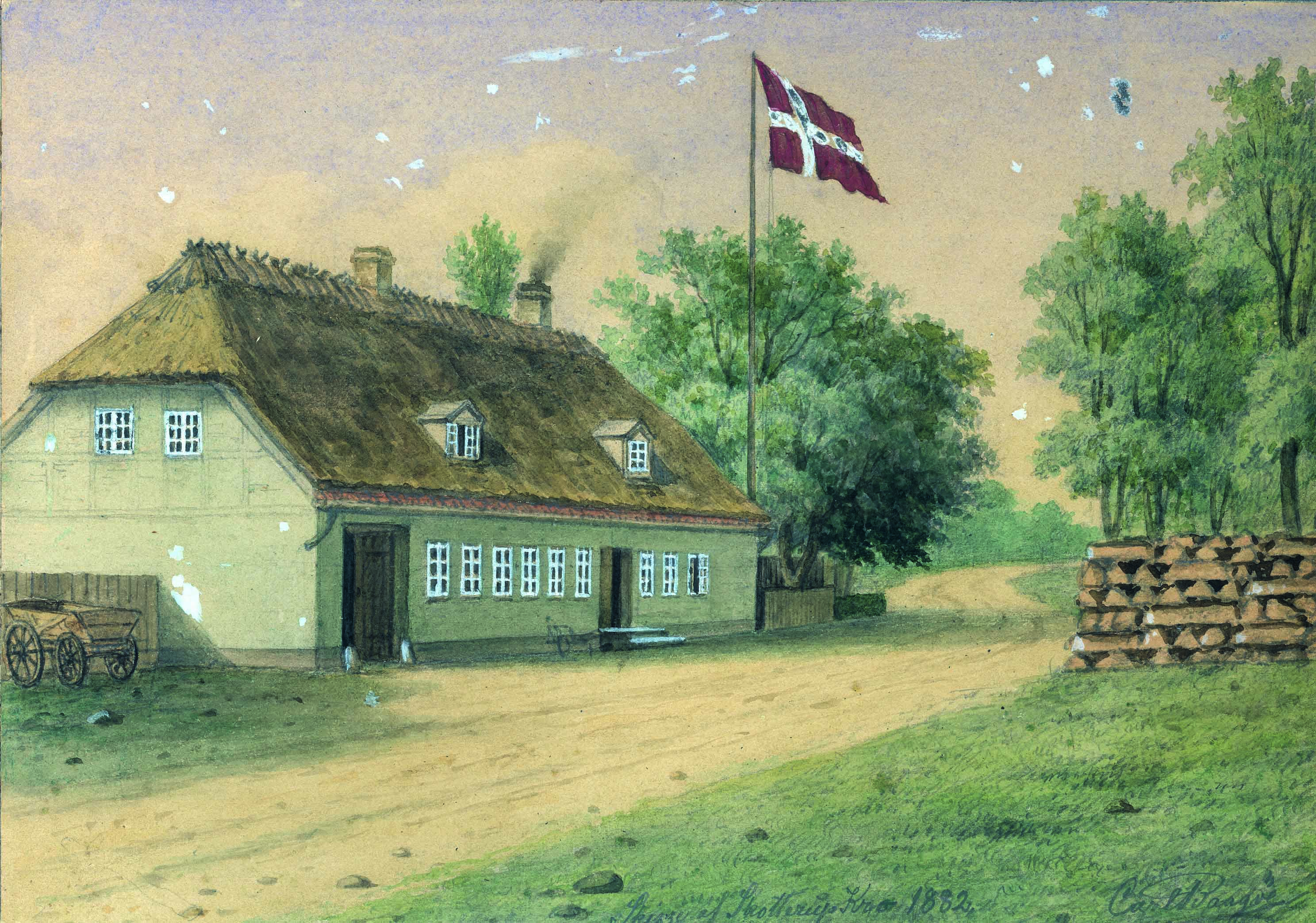
Skotterup Inn painted by Carl Baagøe in 1882

The village had no farms. The only property with more land than a small vegetable garden was Dideriksminde. It owned all the land to the south of the village. between Egebæksvang and the coast and down to Egebækken. Dideriksminde was for years home to a bakery and later also a grocery store before it was converted into an inn in 1835 or 1836. In the 1840s, its owner sold almost all the land and the new big landowner in Skotterup was the property Øresundslyst. Its owner began to rent out or sell lots. The blacksmith in Rørtang built or owned several of the new houses. Most of the new residents were craftsmen or small-scale manufacturers. The owner of Øresundslyst established the short-lived Sønderups Brickyard. More successful was Skotterup Ceramics Factory (Skotterup Lervarefabrik), established by the owner of Jeans Minde. It existed for 67 years.

In the second half of the 19th century, some of houses were converted into country houses by people from Copenhagen or Helsingør. The houses in the original village were still owned by fishermen but they, too, were gradually purchased by outsiders.

== Notable people ==
- Augusta Dohlmann (1847–1914), Danish painter known for flower painting
