= Vilhelm Melbye =

Danish marine artist

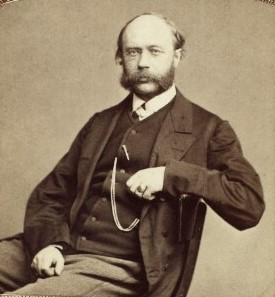
- Born: Knud Frederik Vilhelm Hannibal Melbye; 14 May 1824; Helsingør, Denmark
- Died: 6 October 1882 (aged 58); Roskilde, Denmark
- Resting place: Holmens Kirkegård
- Education: Royal Danish Academy of Fine Arts
- Known for: Marine painting
- Movement: Romanticism
- Relatives: Anton Melbye (brother); Fritz Melbye (brother)

Knud Frederik Vilhelm Hannibal Melbye (14 May 1824 – 6 October 1882) was a Danish marine artist. Over the course of his career, he painted seascapes, coastal and harbor scenes, sailing vessels and topographical subjects in many parts of Europe, especially in the Mediterranean region.

== Biography ==
Melbye was born in Elsinore, Denmark. He was the son of Jacob Buntzen Melbye and Anna Marie (Clara) Christine Løehts. His brothers were painter and photographer Anton Melbye (1818–1875) and marine painter Fritz Melbye (1826–1869). He first trained to become a merchant but then turned to painting, studying under his older brother Anton, already an established marine painter, and attending the Royal Danish Academy of Fine Arts from 1844 to 1847. He also took private classes in perspective drawing with Carl Dahl.

In 1847, he went on his first journey, to Iceland aboard the corvette Valkyrien. In 1848, he became one of the first artists to paint in Skagen. The same year he traveled to Paris by way of Düsseldorf. In Paris he studied with Théodore Gudin (1802–1880) before returning to Denmark in 1849.

He was appointed professor at the academy in Copenhagen in 1880 but died in 1882 in Roskilde. He was interred at Holmens Kirkegård in Copenhagen.

== Works ==
Vilhelm Melbye preferred a realistic style, often also with romantic or dramatic scenes. Many of his works depict southern European coastal or harbor views. He was influenced by his older brother and teacher Anton Melbye but another important influence in his oeuvre was the Düsseldorf School, especially Andreas Achenbach.

== Gallery ==
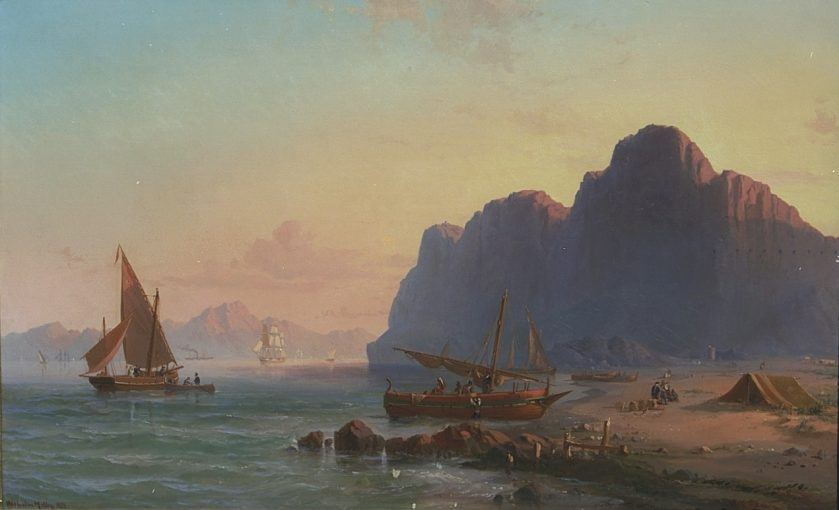
Coastal Scene with fishing and other boats off Gibraltar
(1854)

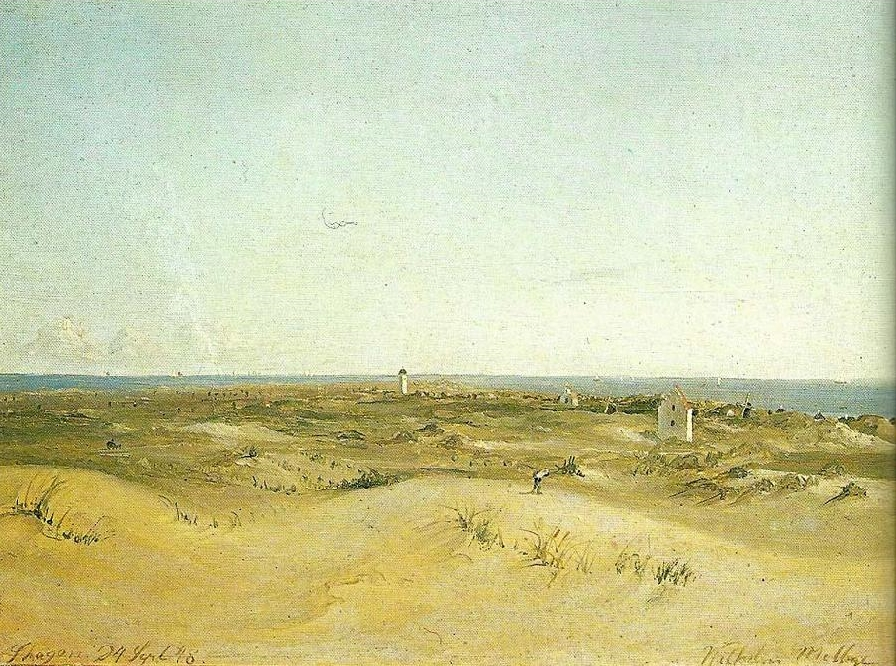
View over Skagen
(1848)

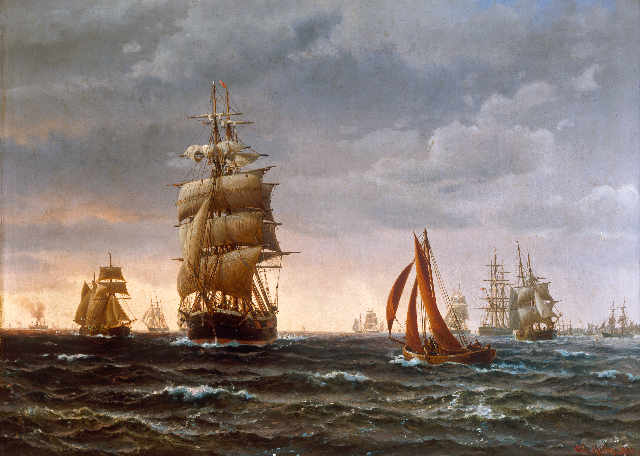
Seascape from Gibraltar
(1850)

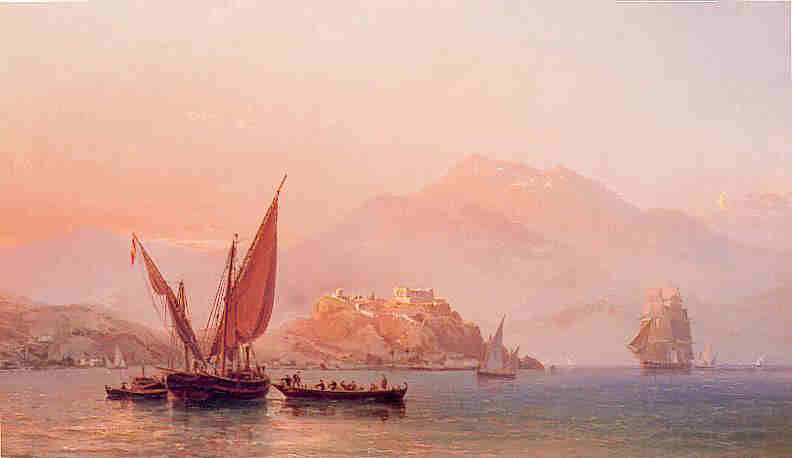
Seascape from Italy
(1852)

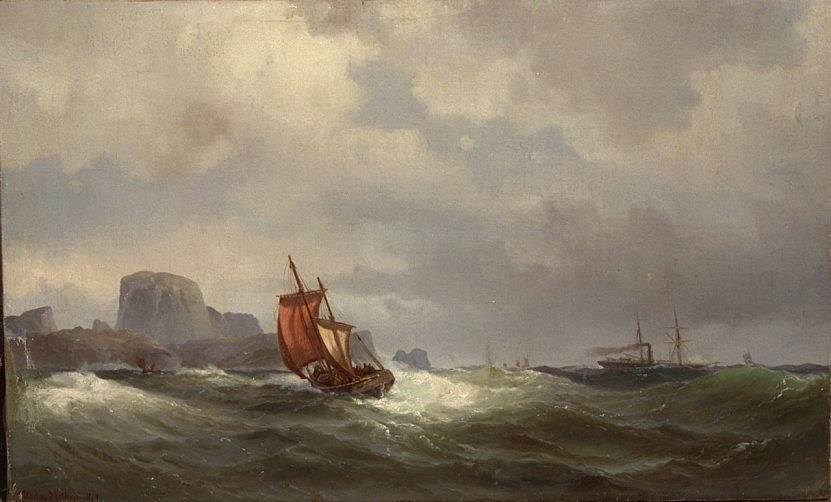
Fishing boat and a steamer off a Rocky Coast
(1870)

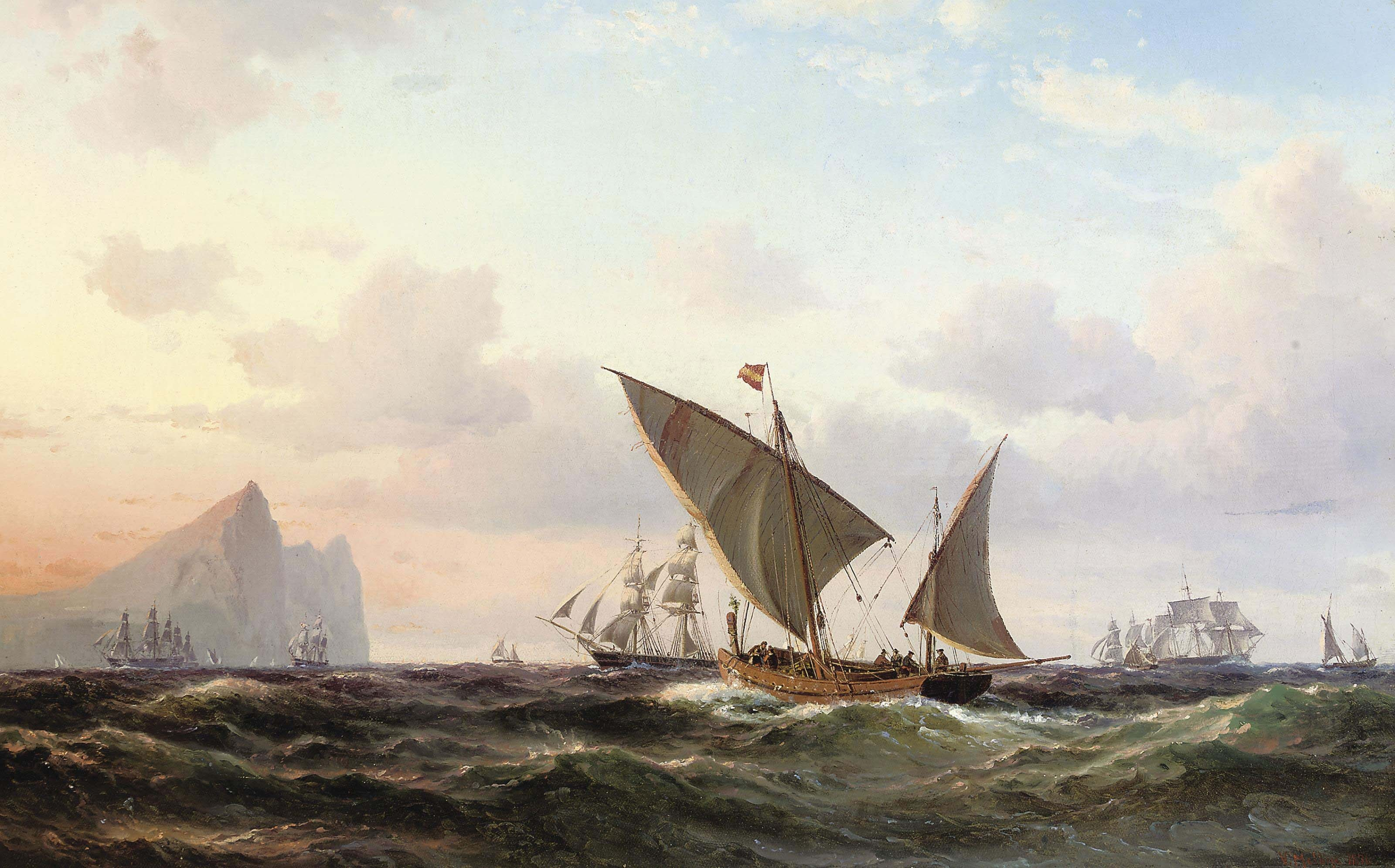
Seascape from Gibraltar
(1882)

== See also ==
- Art of Denmark
- List of painters from Denmark
