= Fritz Melbye =

Danish artist (1826–1869)

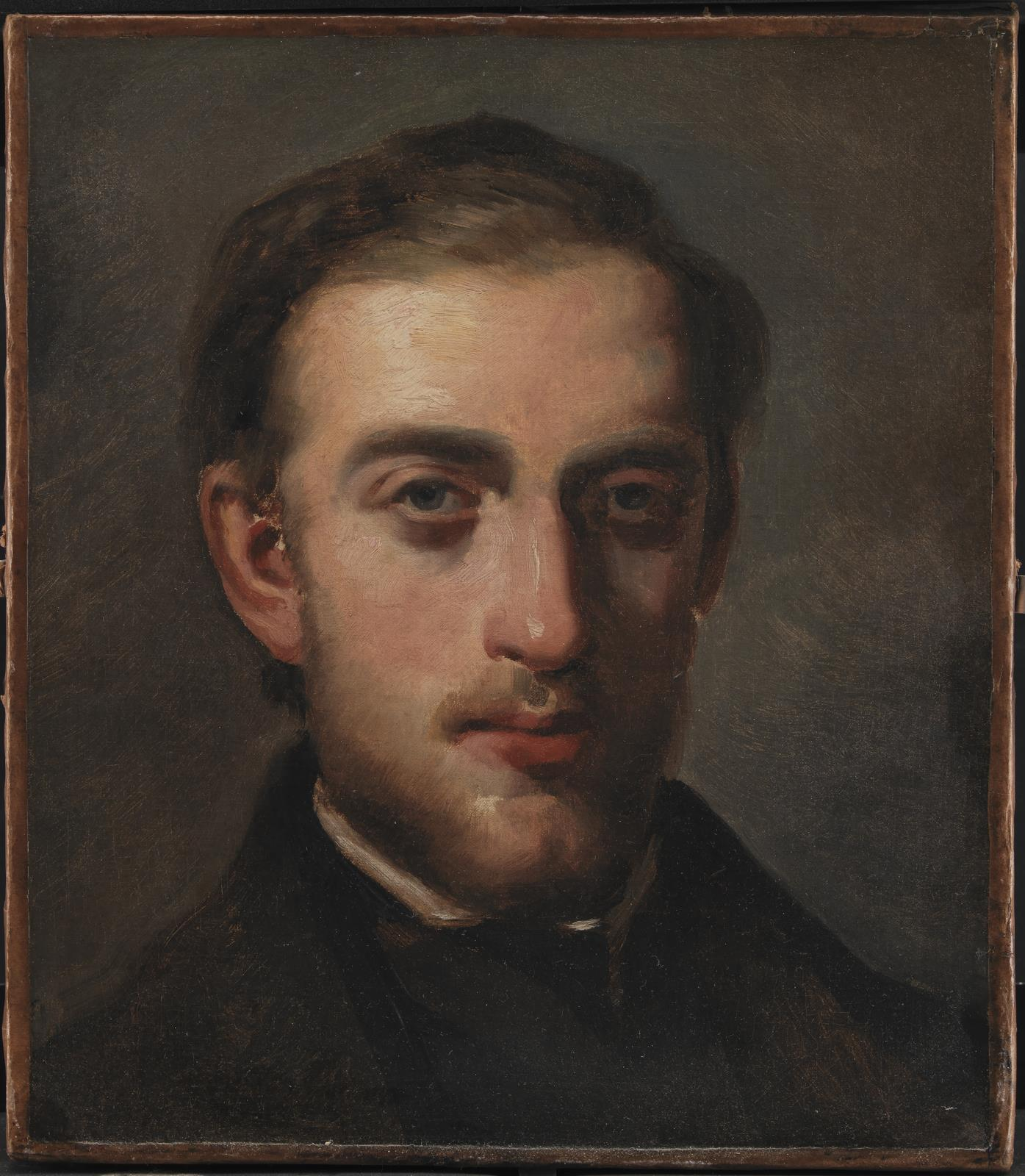
- Melbye painted by Camille Pissarro in 1857
- Born: Fritz Sigfred Georg Melbye; 24 August 1826; Helsingør, Denmark
- Died: 14 December 1869 (aged 43); Shanghai, China
- Education: Anton Melbye
- Known for: Painting
- Movement: Romanticism

Fritz Sigfred Georg Melbye (24 August 1826 – 14 December 1869) was a Danish marine painter, the brother of Anton Melbye and Vilhelm Melbye who were also marine painters. He traveled widely, painting seascapes, coastal and harbour scenes as well as some landscapes in Europe, the Caribbean, Venezuela, North America and Asia.

== Biography ==
Fritz Melbye was born on 24 August 1826 in Elsinore, Denmark. He trained as a painter under his older brother, Anton Melbye and, in 1849, set off for the Danish West Indies, settling on Saint Thomas. There he met the young Camille Pissarro whom he inspired to take up painting as a full-time profession. Pissarro became his pupil as well as close friend.

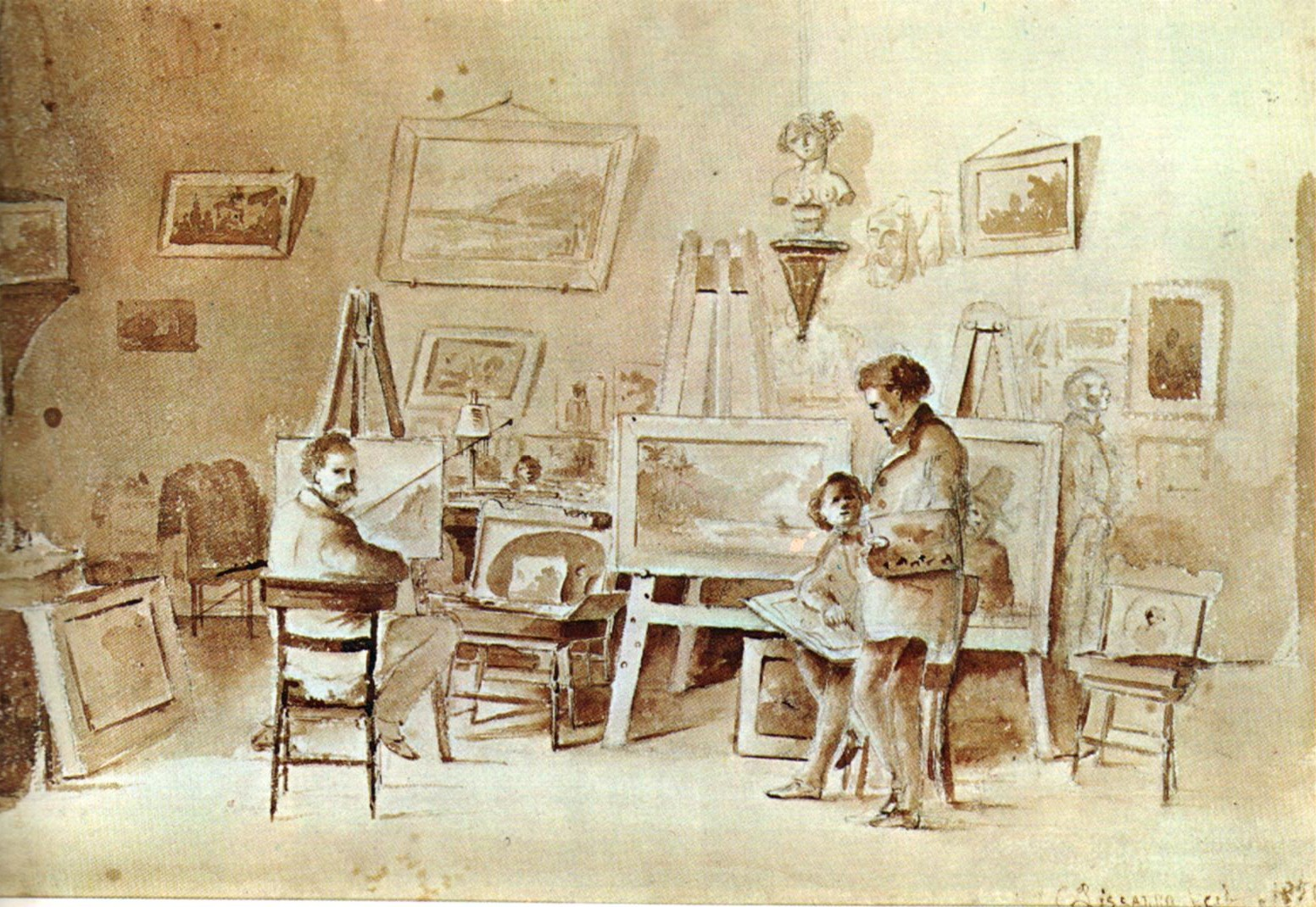
Camille Pissarro: Melby and Pissarro in their studio in Carracas, c. 1854

In April 1852, Melbye was on Saint Croix, preparing a trip to Venezuela. Pissarro decided to join him and they spent two years together in Caracas and the harbour city of La Guaira before Pissarro returned to Saint Thomas. Melbye stayed until 1856 and then briefly returned to Europe, living some time in Paris, before traveling to North America where he set up a studio in New York City.

He continued to travel widely, mainly to the Caribbean but also north to Newfoundland. A close friend in New York and frequent travelling companion on his Caribbean travels was the famous American landscape painter Frederic Church, who also had a studio in New York.

In 1866, Melbye set off on a journey to the Far East in search of new adventures, leaving his studio in Church's care. In Asia he used Peking as a base for travels around the region which also took him to Japan. He died in Shanghai three years later.

== Works ==
Fritz Melbye initially painted seascapes in the family tradition his brother had taught him, but he increasingly turned to landscapes, coastal and town views. He preferred a realistic style, often with romantic scenes. He exhibited at Charlottenborg in Copenhagen from 1849-1858.

In Peking he was commissioned to paint the Imperial Summer Palace and during his years in America he exhibited at the Pennsylvania Academy of Fine Art.

== Gallery ==
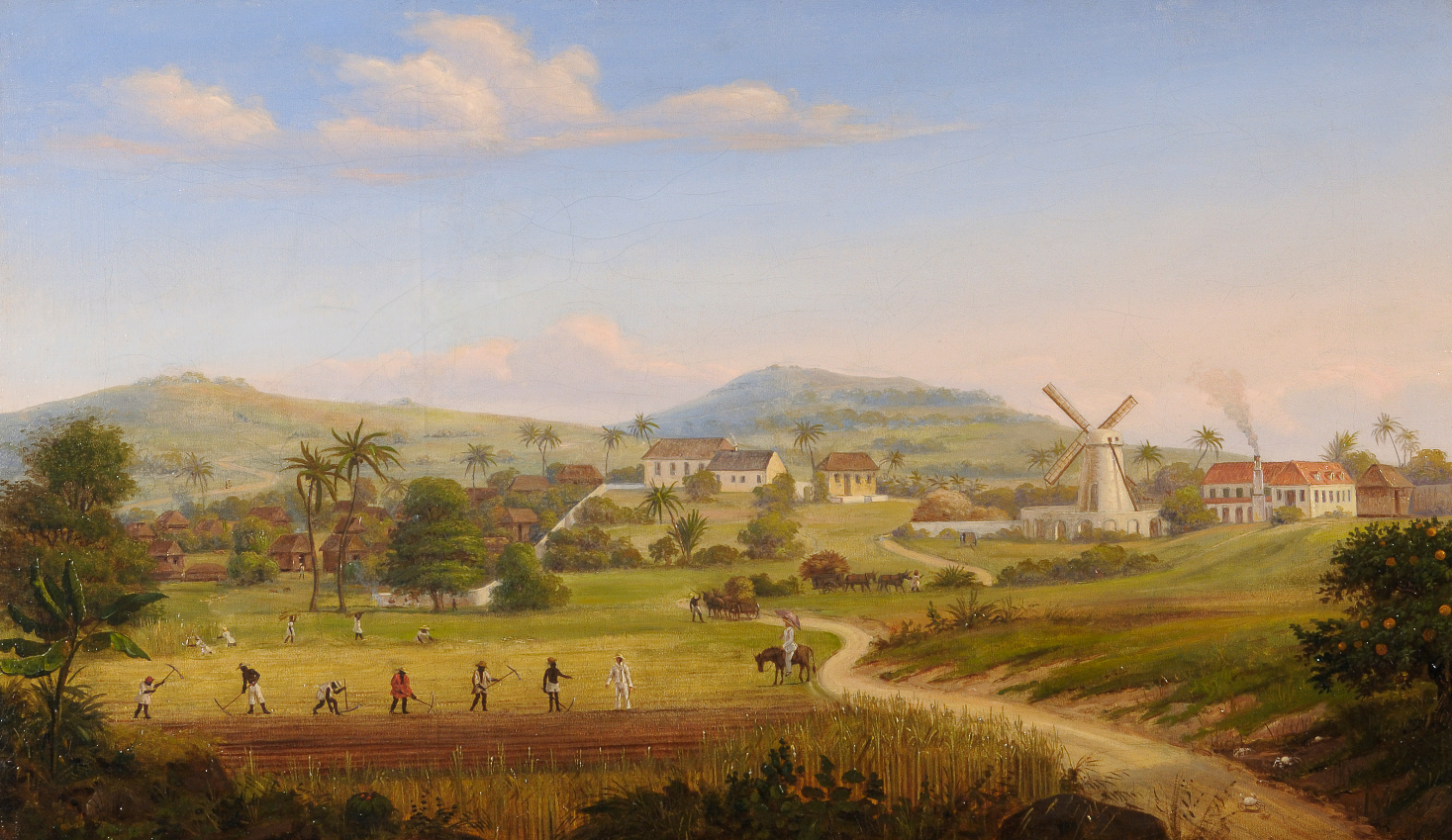
Pastoral scene from the Danish West Indies, c. 1850

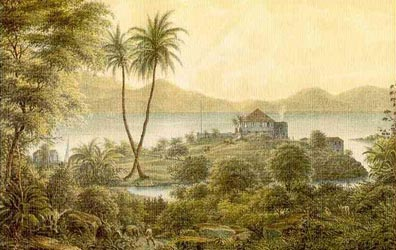
Cruz Bay Battery on St. John, c. 1850

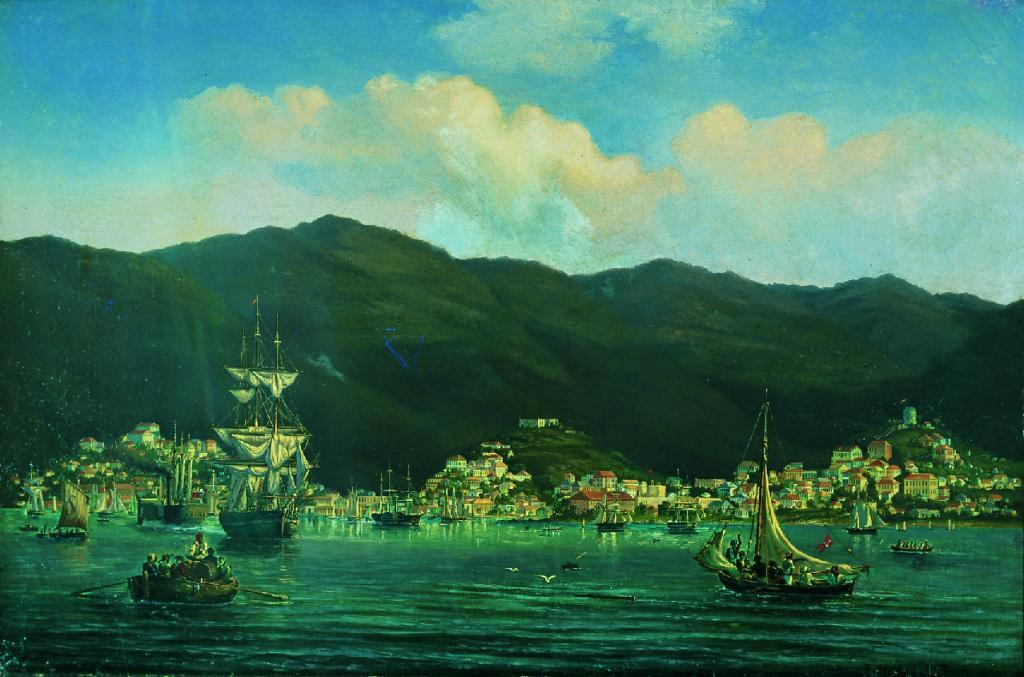
The harbour at St. Thomas, 1852

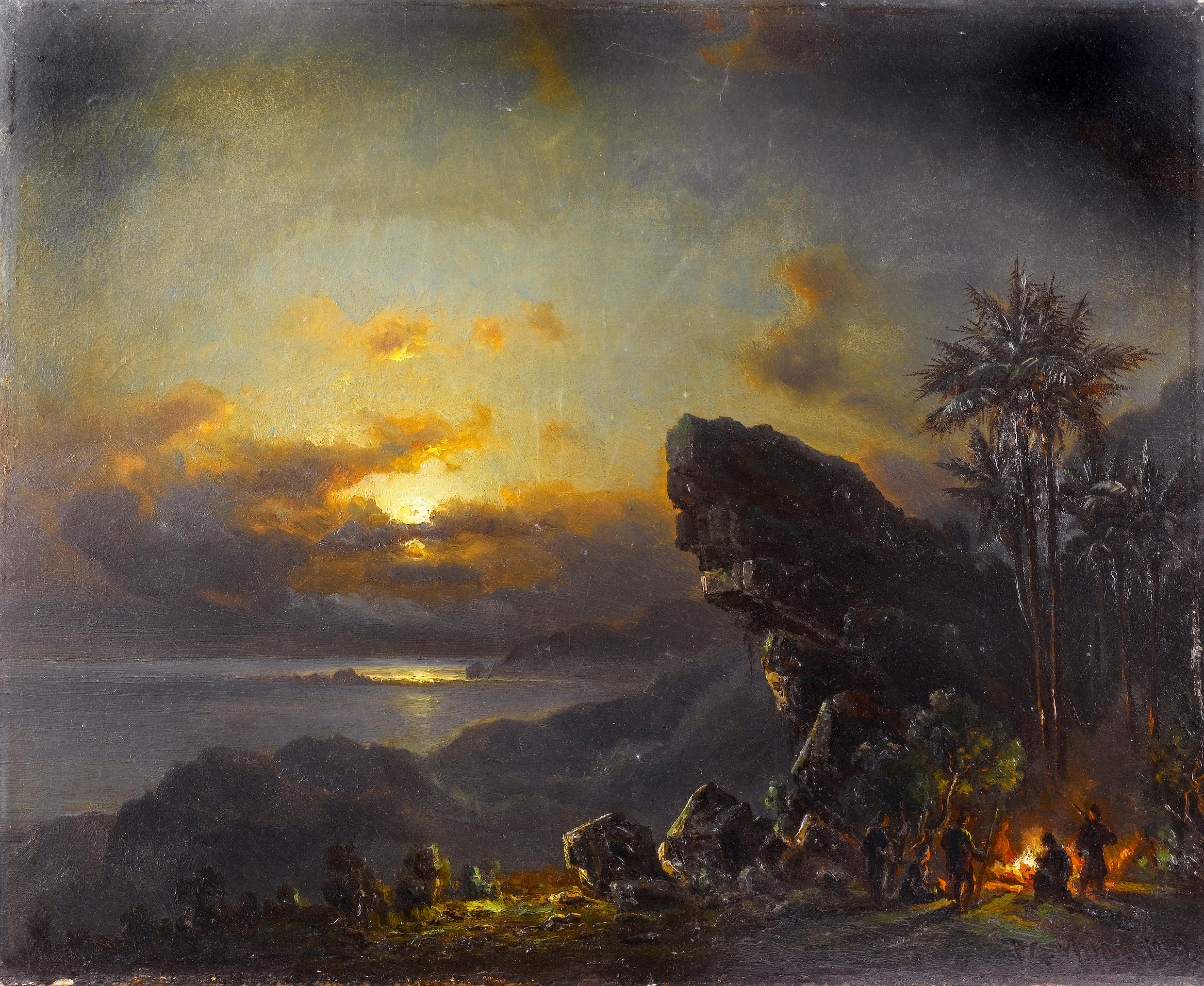
Figures round a fire by moonlight, 1867

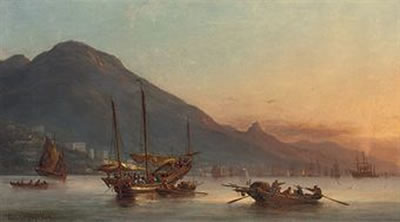
Junks, sampans and western shipping lying off Hong Kong at dusk

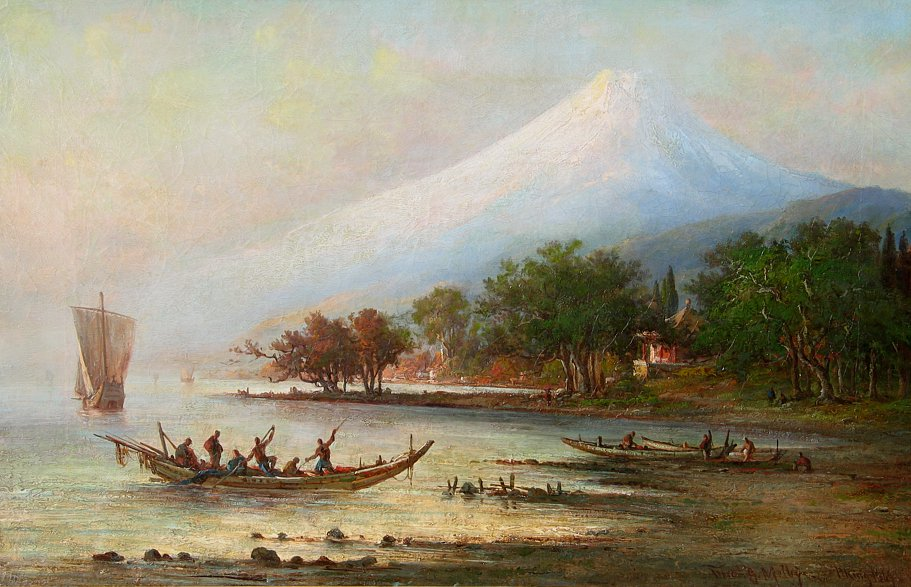
Marine Painting with Shipping off the Fujijama, Japan, in early Morning Light, 1869

== See also ==
- Art of Denmark
