= Mads Melbye =

Danish medical doctor and scientist

- Education: University of Aarhus
- Known for: Health effects of vaccines Infectious disease epidemiology
- Scientific career
- Fields: Epidemiology
- Institutions: Stanford University School of Medicine; Statens Serum Institut; University of Copenhagen

Mads Melbye is a Danish epidemiologist. Among many other important research findings, one of his most important contributions to public health is his and his colleagues' 2002 study that showed that there is no association between the MMR vaccine and risk of autism.

== Early life and education ==
Mads Melbye earned his M.D. degree from University of Aarhus, Denmark, in 1983, and a DMSc degree from the same university in 1988. His thesis work was partly done as a fellow in the epidemiology program (1985–1986) at the National Cancer Institute, NIH, US.

== Career ==
After clinical training Melbye became senior investigator in 1989 at the Danish Cancer Registry in Copenhagen, and in 1991 state epidemiologist at Statens Serum Institut (SSI) in Copenhagen.

In 1992, Melbye was given a personal chair in infectious disease and cancer epidemiology by the Danish minister for research and education. He founded the Department of Epidemiology Research at SSI.

From 1998 to 2008 he was foreign adjunct professor at Medical Epidemiology and Biostatistics Branch at Karolinska University in Stockholm. In 2012 he established the Danish National Biobank, which is one of the biggest biobanks in the world. In the same year he became senior vice-president at Statens Serum Institut in Copenhagen, and from 2016 until 2020 he was president and CEO.

He is presently professor of medical epidemiology at University of Copenhagen and affiliated with Department of Genetics at Stanford University School of Medicine. He is also director of the Cancer Institute in Denmark (DCRC).

== Research ==
In his thesis work, entitled "The natural history of HTLV-III infection", from 1986, he described the natural history of HIV (first named HTLV-III) based on studies of homosexual men, hemophiliacs, and African populations. Many of the findings from these studies helped define the AIDS intervention campaigns. In 1984, he showed that in Danish gay men, HIV infection occurred via sexual contact with gay men in the US and that the primary route was anal receptive intercourse. In the summer of 1984, he published the first report to document that hemophiliacs were heavily infected with HIV and later the same year that HIV infection was caused by commercially manufactured factor VIII based on blood from American donors. The paper was accompanied by an editorial stating that there was now sufficient evidence for immediate worldwide introduction of heat-treatment of factor VIII products. He and his colleges later showed that Kaposi's sarcoma, an AIDS-defining disease, was not associated with HIV infection. (This cancer was later shown by others to be caused by HHV8). In another paper based on field work in Zambia he showed that HIV infection was prevalent in that part of Africa (overall 17.5% seropositivity, being 37.5% among patients repeatedly seen in the STD clinic) and that HIV was transmitted heterosexually. He also documented that the epidemic in Zambia was new, setting the scene for what to expect in other parts of Africa, if drastic preventive measures were not taken immediately.

Melbye later became occupied with research on the etiology of cancer and has done pioneering work in the areas of breast cancer, anal cancer, cervical cancer, and Hodgkin lymphoma. In 1991 he hypothesised and provided evidence that anal cancer may have the same aetiology as cervical cancer. In a later paper he and his group substantiated their findings reporting a highly significant association between number of sexual partners and risk of anal cancer. Furthermore, they documented that the majority of anal cancers were HPV-16 positive. Their finding has tremendous importance because it suggests that a vaccine against high-risk HPV types, not only protects against cervical cancer but also anal cancer. Partly based on this evidence, it is now recommended in an increasing number of countries, including Scandinavian countries, to offer HPV vaccination not only to girls but also to boys.

In a study from 2003, Henrik Hjalgrim and Mads Melbye provided evidence for an etiological link between yet another virus and cancer. They used large population-based data and pathology specimens to show that in some situations infection with Epstein-Barr virus leads to the development of Hodgkin lymphoma. They were able to calculated the time from infection to cancer diagnosis and showed that in this situation the incubation period was 3.5 years. In an interview with the CBS News, Professor Richard Ambinder of Johns Hopkins School of Medicine who is an internationally recognized expert on this malignancy said: "I think it removes the last shade of doubt that the virus actually has something to do with causing Hodgkin's disease."

Breast cancer is the most prevalent cancer in women worldwide. Among the few known factors that lower a woman's risk of breast cancer is her number of child births. Melbye and his group recently found that pregnancies lasting only 33 weeks did not confer a risk reduction whereas pregnancies lasting 34 or longer gave the protection. In other words, something happens to the breast tissue between week 33 and week 34 of pregnancy that holds the key to our understanding of how to reduce breast cancer risk.

Vaccination is the most effective method of preventing infectious diseases and widespread immunity due to vaccination is largely responsible for the worldwide eradication of smallpox and the restriction of diseases such as polio, measles, and tetanus from much of the world. However, claims that the MMR vaccination caused autism have challenged the vaccination program and lowered vaccination coverage, in particular for the MMR vaccine, in many societies around the world. In what must be considered one of Melbye's most important contributions to public health is his and his colleagues' work that showed, that there is no association between the MMR vaccination and risk of autism in the vaccinated children. This paper was accompanied by an editorial in The New England Journal of Medicine, stating that the contribution by Melbye provided the definitive evidence for no association. Together with Anders Hviid and colleagues he published a follow-up in 2019 on the topic that dealt with issues not covered in the original publication. This paper also found no evidence of an association.

Melbye and his group has contributed to the identification of genes and gene variants involved in or associated with disease development, e.g. in pyloric stenosis, hypospadias, febrile seizures, and pre-term births. A large number of other papers by Melbye and his group have evaluated the safety of drugs. Many have evaluated drug safety in pregnant women and children and have contributed to our understanding of pharmacovigilance.

In two recent papers published in Science and Cell, Melbye, together with Stanford professors Stephen Quake and Michael Snyder, demonstrated how the use of new technologies makes it possible based on a blood test among pregnant woman to predict gestational age, due date and preterm birth with high precision. These methods predicts due day better than ultrasound in the late second and third trimester. Turned into simple tests, such products holds great promise for use in middle and low income countries where skilled personnel and ultrasound equipment is sparse. Furthermore, preterm birth is the single factor leading to most morbidity and mortalities among newborns, but lack of methods to predict such pregnancy outcomes have up till now made it nearly impossible to study methods to prevent preterm birth.

== Honours and awards ==
- Knighted by Her Majesty Margrethe II, Queen of Denmark (2018)
- The Mackenzie Lecture, Dundee, Scotland (2015); The Large Erhoff Prize (2014);
- Novo Nordisk Prize (2005)
- Thorvald Madsen Prize (1998)
- Ipsen lecture (1993)
- Anders Jahre Prize for Young Scientists, Oslo, Norway (1992);
- Danish AIDS Society Prize (1989)
- Hjortenberg Foundation Prize (1985)
