= Anton Melbye =

Danish artist

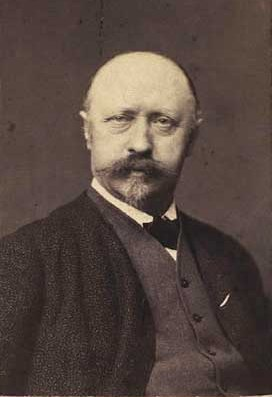
Melbye in 1868

Daniel Herman Anton Melbye (13 February 1818 – 10 January 1875) was a Danish painter and photographer who specialised in marine art. He was the brother of fellow painters Vilhelm and Fritz Melbye.

== Life ==
His father was a Royal Customs officer. He had originally planned on a naval career but, because of his myopia, was sent to learn shipbuilding instead. His inclinations for music and art asserted themselves, however, and he left engineering school to learn the guitar.

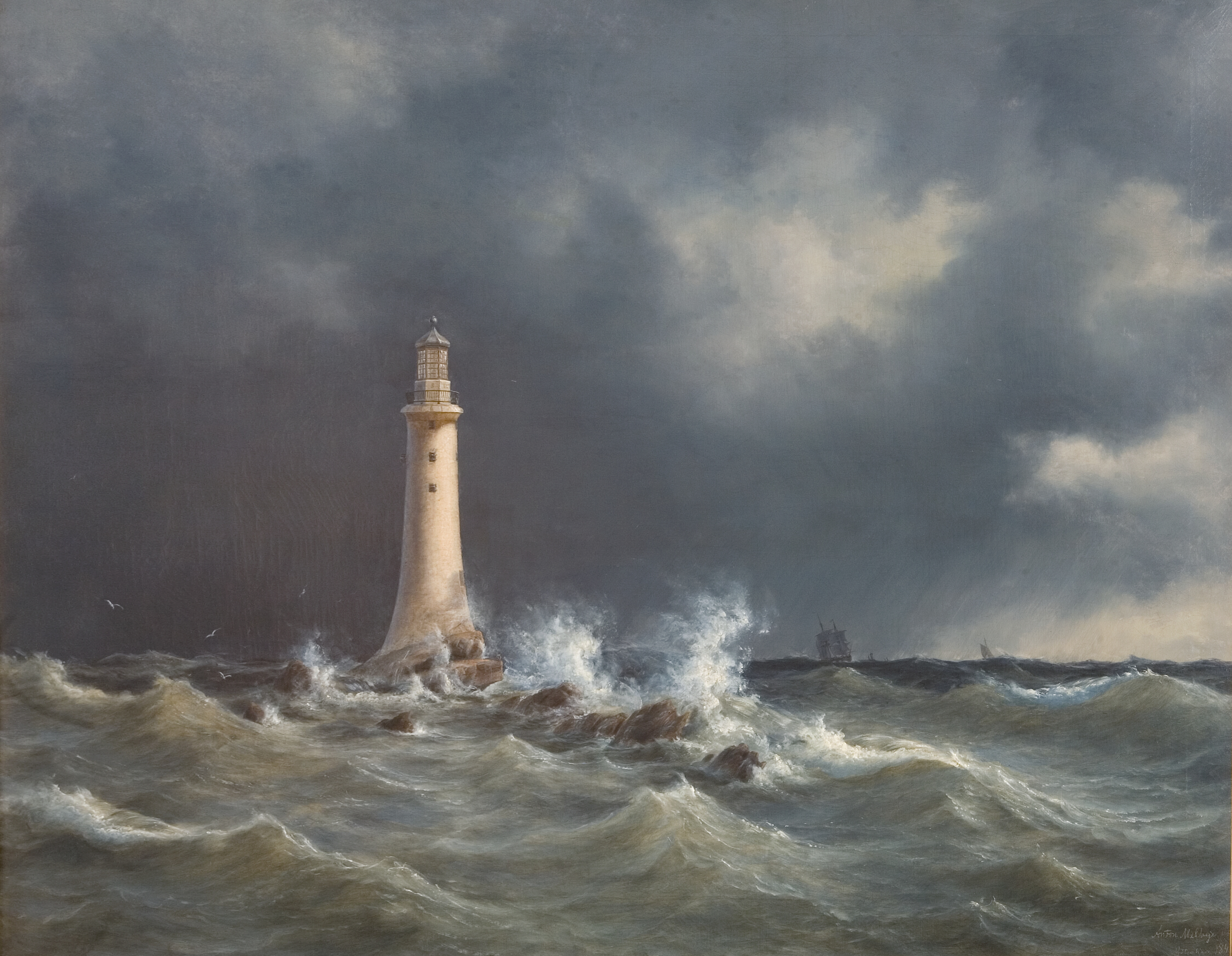
Eddystone Lighthouse

He also wanted to be a marine painter and attended the Royal Danish Academy of Fine Arts for a year, in 1838, taking C.W. Eckersberg as his mentor. By 1840, he was already exhibiting some seascapes that attracted the attention of the German art collector, Karl Friedrich von Rumohr. On his recommendation, Melbye accompanied King Christian VIII on his corvette for a voyage through the Baltic and North Seas.

Soon after, he was invited to accompany the King on a voyage to Morocco, where he witnessed the Bombardment of Tangiers. In 1845, he applied to the Royal Academy for a travel scholarship, but was passed over. With the support of the King, he was awarded the money in 1846 and his painting of the Eddystone Lighthouse was purchased for the Royal Collection. It also won the Thorvaldsen Medal. This brought a rush of orders that forced him to postpone his trip.

=== Years in Paris ===
He finally arrived in Paris in 1847 and remained through the Revolution; receiving a year's extension on his scholarship. His name soon became known in local articles circles and he remained there even longer. In 1853, he was given the chance to travel with a French expedition to Istanbul. For a time, he lived with the French Ambassador, Achille Baraguey d'Hilliers, and painted a portrait of Sultan Abdülmecid I. During these years, he also received a commission from Napoleon III and learned how to take daguerrotypes directly from Louis Daguerre, just before his death.

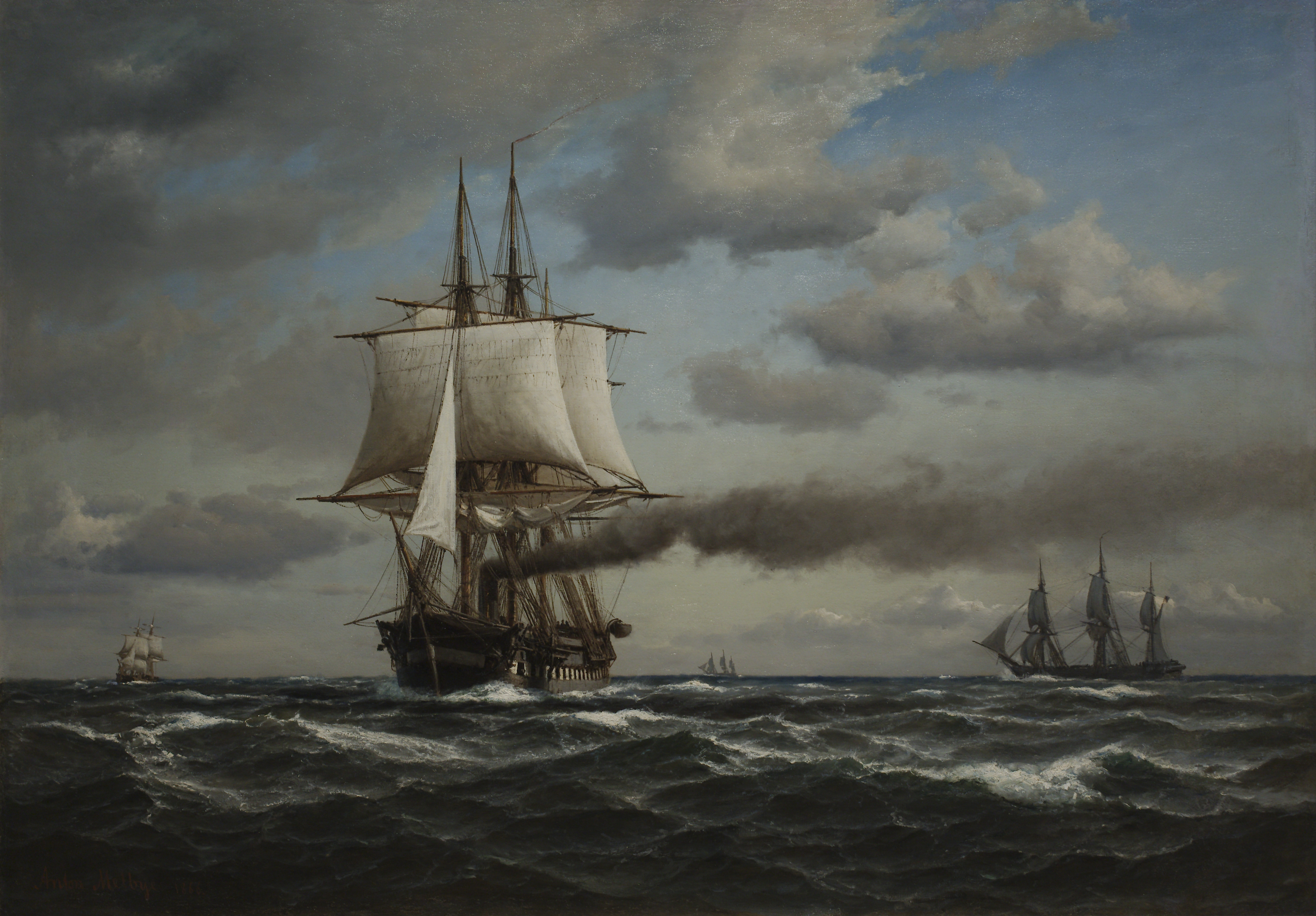
The Frigate "Jylland" (1866)

He was married in 1857 and returned to Denmark the following year. Upon his arrival, he was named a member of the Royal Academy and awarded the Order of the Dannebrog. In 1862, he became a Professor. During his later years, he divided his time between Copenhagen, Hamburg and Paris. Despite his great success, he was often frustrated that everyone he met referred to his picture of the lighthouse as his greatest painting. Worsening health gradually affected his ability to paint, so he turned to charcoal and chalk sketches. He died during a stay in Paris and was buried there.

His paintings are realistic, often enhanced with dramatic light and weather effects (he was especially fond of portraying inclement weather), and show the influence of Camille Corot, who he met in Paris.
