= Vilhelm Petersen (painter) =

Danish landscape painter (1812–1880)

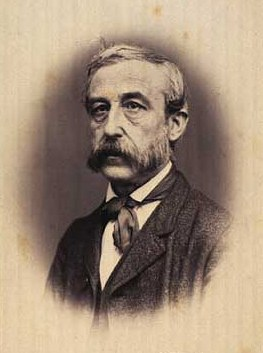
- Born: 17 December 1812; Copenhagen, Denmark
- Died: 25 July 1880 (aged 67); Copenhagen, Denmark
- Resting place: Assistens Cemetery
- Education: Royal Danish Academy of Fine Arts
- Spouse: Sophie Margrethe Sørensen-Groth (1838–1916)
- Awards: Sødrings Legat (1877)

Vilhelm Peter Carl Petersen (17 December 1812 – 25 July 1880) was a Danish landscape painter. He was one of the first Danish landscape painters to work on Bornholm and in the moorlands of Jutland. Small fishing villages were especially attractive to him.

== Biography ==
Vilhelm Petersen was born in Copenhagen. He was the son of a wagon manufacturer. In 1830, he became a student at the Royal Danish Academy of Fine Arts where he studied landscape painting. His work was first featured at the Charlottenborg Spring Exhibition in 1833. His first painting, A Party in Nødebo, was purchased by the Kunstforeningen.

He received a travel stipend from the Academy in 1848 but, because of the political unrest in Europe, had to postpone leaving until 1850. Travelling to Italy by way of the Netherlands, Germany and the Tyrol, he spent two years in Rome.

He exhibited regularly until 1860, then stopped for a few years; holding some major showings from 1873 to 1874. Part of this break was due to family obligations that arose from his father's illness and death and the necessity of taking work as a drawing teacher. In 1864, he married Sophie Margrethe Sørensen-Groth (1838-1916), the daughter of a retired sea captain. In 1877, he was a recipient of the "Sødrings Legat", an endowment for artists established by the painter Frederik Sødring.

He died in Copenhagen and was buried at Assistens Cemetery. His art is on display at the National Gallery of Denmark as well at Øregaard Museum, Bornholm Art Museum, Sorø Art Museum, Helsingør City Museum, Skovgaard Museum and Randers Museum of Art.

== Gallery ==
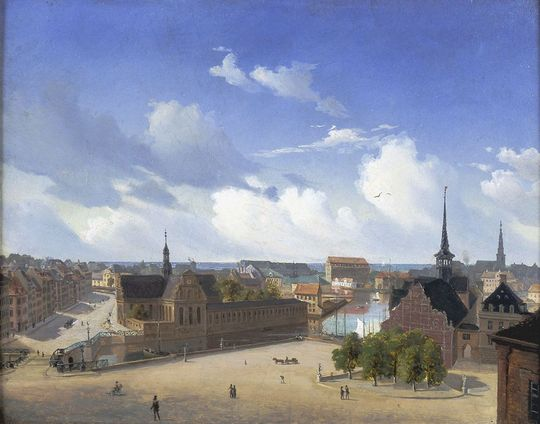
Church of Holmen
(c. 1855)

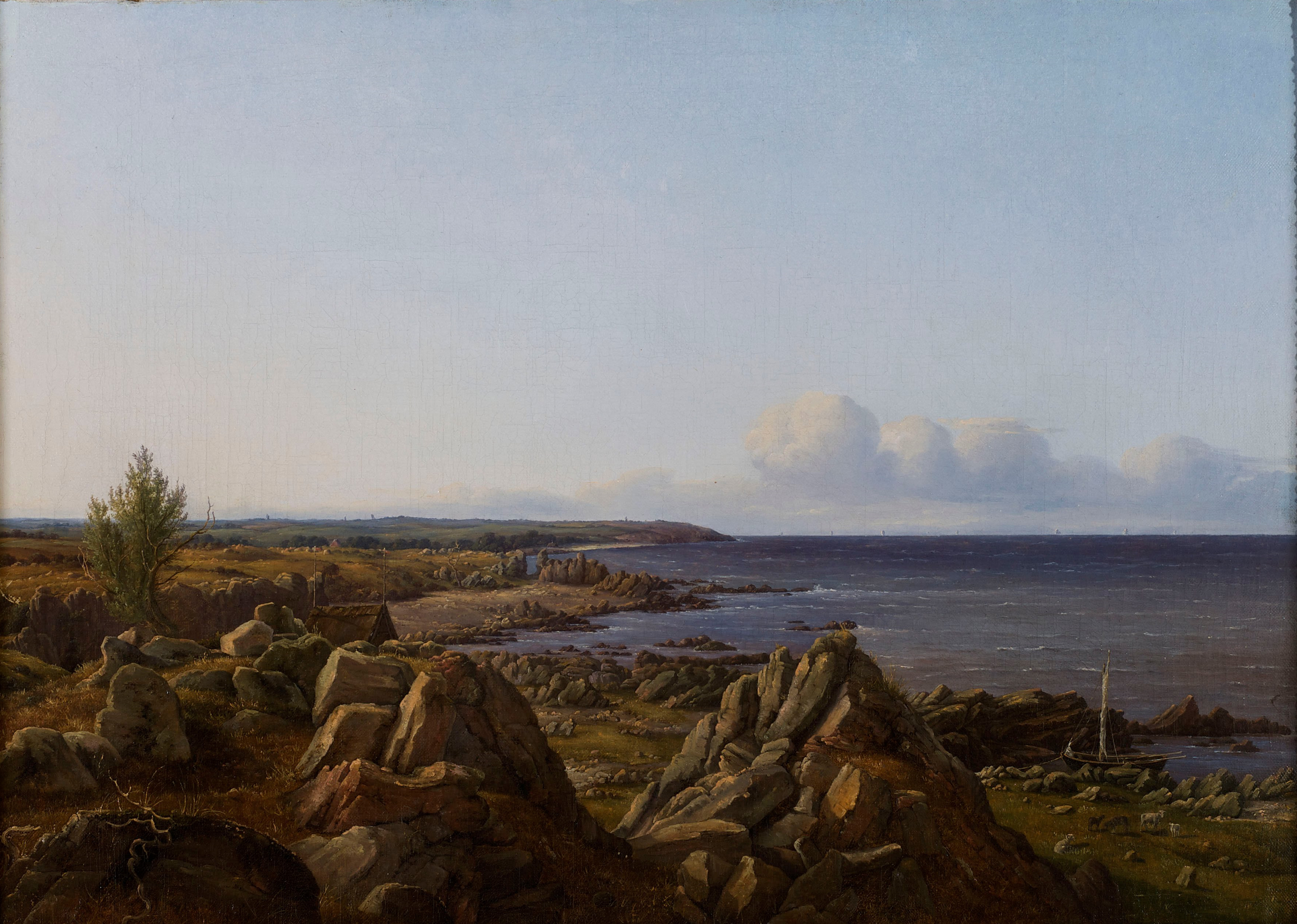
View of Østerlarsker parish
(1838)

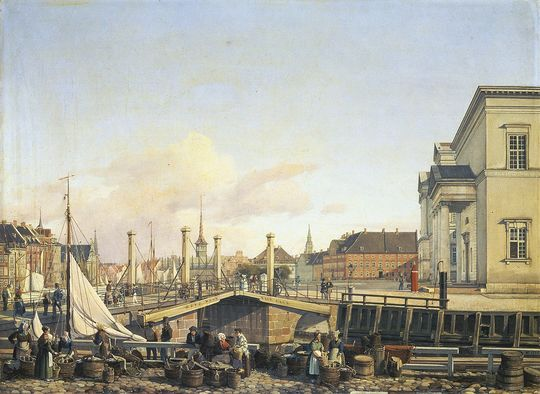
Højbro with a view of Slotsholmen
(1839)
