= 2021 Helsingør municipal election =

← 2017	16 November 2021	2025 →

All 25 seats to the Helsingør Municipal Council 13 seats needed for a majority
- Turnout: 34,738 (68.6%) ▼3.4pp
	First party	Second party	Third party
	C	A	Ø
Party	Conservatives	Social Democrats	Red–Green Alliance
Last election	9 seats, 32.8%	8 seats, 24.4%	2 seats, 7.8%
Seats won	10	7	2
Seat change	▲1	▼1	0
Popular vote	11,875	8,903	2,386
Percentage	34.7%	26.0%	7.0%
Swing	▲2.0%	▲1.6%	▼0.8%
	Fourth party	Fifth party	Sixth party
	B	D	V
Party	Social Liberals	New Right	Venstre
Last election	1 seat, 5.0%	0 seats, 2.3%	1 seat, 4.0%
Seats won	2	1	1
Seat change	▲1	▲1	0
Popular vote	2,298	2,149	1,905
Percentage	6.7%	6.3%	5.6%
Swing	▲1.8%	▲4.0%	▲1.6%
	Seventh party	Eighth party
	F	O
Party	Green Left	Danish People's Party
Last election	1 seat, 3.5%	2 seats, 9.2%
Seats won	1	1
Seat change	0	▼1
Popular vote	1,736	1,602
Percentage	5.1%	4.7%
Swing	▲1.5%	▼4.5%
Mayor before election
Benedikte Kiær
Conservatives
Mayor after election
Benedikte Kiær
Conservatives

Helsingør Municipality had have Conservative rule for 22 of the last 26 years. . (Note: Helsingør Municipality was not affected by the 2007 municipal reform) Venstre had held the mayor's position in the 4 other years, after making an agreement with 3 parties of the red bloc following the 2009 election . However, in 2013, Benedikte Kiær would win the mayor's position back to Conservatives.

In the 2017 election, Conservatives had won 9 seats, and would become the sole largest party for the 7th time in a row. However, none of the traditional blocs had a majority without local party Lokaldemokraterne. The result would be that the Conservatives with Benedikte Kiær as mayoral candidate, would be able to reach a broad agreement with the Social Democrats, the Social Liberals, Danish People's Party and Venstre.

In this election, once again the Conservatives would become the largest party. They won a total of 10 seats, the most since the 2001 election. The traditional blue bloc had won 13 seats, and it looked like Benedikte Kiær could continue as mayor. The bloc would eventually make use of its majority, and on the election night it could be announced that she would continue as mayor.

== Electoral system ==
For elections to Danish municipalities, a number varying from 9 to 31 are chosen to be elected to the municipal council. The seats are then allocated using the D'Hondt method and a closed list proportional representation. Helsingør Municipality had 25 seats in 2021

Unlike in Danish General Elections, in elections to municipal councils, electoral alliances are allowed.

== Electoral alliances ==
=== Electoral Alliance 1 ===
Party		Political alignment
C	Conservatives	Centre-right
D	New Right	Right-wing to Far-right
I	Liberal Alliance	Centre-right to Right-wing
O	Danish People's Party	Right-wing to Far-right
V	Venstre	Centre-right

=== Electoral Alliance 2 ===
Party		Political alignment
B	Social Liberals	Centre to Centre-left
Å	The Alternative	Centre-left to Left-wing

=== Electoral Alliance 3 ===
Party		Political alignment
A	Social Democrats	Centre-left
F	Green Left	Centre-left to Left-wing
Ø	Red–Green Alliance	Left-wing to Far-Left

== Results by polling station ==
H = Projekt Transparens
J = Listehansen
P = Bella Listen

Division	A	B	C	D	F	H	I	J	O	P	V	Ø	Å
Division	%	%	%	%	%	%	%	%	%	%	%	%	%
Helsingør Hallen	28.4	6.2	31.3	6.3	6.0	0.0	1.4	0.3	4.9	0.0	3.9	8.7	2.6
Skolen ved Gurrevej	36.3	4.1	24.6	7.9	5.1	0.0	0.9	0.2	6.9	0.0	3.6	8.3	2.2
Laden, Gl. Vapnagård	31.9	5.6	28.0	7.0	5.3	0.0	1.2	0.4	5.7	0.1	4.2	8.6	2.1
Bølgen	23.6	5.0	44.7	5.6	3.9	0.0	1.3	0.1	4.1	0.0	4.6	5.3	1.8
Kvistgård Idrætsanlæg	23.3	7.1	30.3	8.3	5.5	0.0	2.8	0.0	7.1	0.2	6.8	5.5	3.1
Tikøb Skole	14.7	10.1	42.2	7.6	2.3	0.0	1.0	0.0	4.0	0.0	12.9	3.6	1.6
Nygård Skole	20.0	6.1	38.4	9.3	3.8	0.5	2.2	0.0	4.1	0.0	6.6	5.9	3.2
Hornbæk Skole	21.9	7.4	41.9	5.8	4.7	0.0	1.0	0.1	3.6	0.0	6.5	4.4	2.5
Snekkersten Hallen	23.9	7.5	39.6	5.8	5.1	0.0	1.4	0.1	3.8	0.0	5.0	5.9	1.8
Espergærde Bibliotek	18.6	9.9	41.8	4.5	5.6	0.1	1.2	0.0	2.7	0.1	7.2	5.7	2.7
Mørdrupskolen	23.7	8.0	34.3	5.5	4.9	0.0	1.1	0.0	4.6	0.0	9.6	5.7	2.6
Toldkammeret	21.2	9.3	31.3	5.1	6.3	0.0	2.0	0.5	3.7	0.1	3.9	13.1	3.4

== Results ==
Party		Votes	%	+/-	Seats	+/-
Helsingør Municipality
C	Conservatives	11,875	34.74	+1.96	10	+1
A	Social Democrats	8,903	26.05	+1.63	7	-1
Ø	Red-Green Alliance	2,386	6.98	-0.80	2	0
B	Social Liberals	2,298	6.72	+1.77	2	+1
D	New Right	2,149	6.29	+3.97	1	+1
V	Venstre	1,905	5.57	+1.60	1	0
F	Green Left	1,736	5.08	+1.54	1	0
O	Danish People's Party	1,602	4.69	-4.53	1	-1
Å	The Alternative	811	2.37	-0.37	0	0
I	Liberal Alliance	431	1.26	-0.18	0	0
J	Listehansen	60	0.18	New	0	New
P	Bella Listen	13	0.04	-0.02	0	0
H	Projekt Transparens	10	0.03	New	0	New
Total		34,179	100	N/A	25	N/A
Invalid votes		124	0.24	-0.05		
Blank votes		435	0.86	+0.20		
Turnout		34,738	68.57	-3.41		
Source: valg.dk
