= 2025 Helsingør municipal election =

Municipal election in Denmark

- 18 November 2025

All 25 seats to the Helsingør municipal council 13 seats needed for a majority
- Turnout: 36,504 (70.5%) ▲1.9%
	First party	Second party	Third party
	C	A	F
Party	Conservatives	Social Democrats	Green Left
Last election	10 seats, 34.7%	7 seats, 26.0%	1 seat, 5.1%
Seats won	9	5	3
Seat change	▼1	▼2	▲2
Popular vote	10,160	7,614	3,982
Percentage	28.3%	21.2%	11.1%
Swing	▼6.4%	▼4.8%	▲6.0%
	Fourth party	Fifth party	Sixth party
	Ø	O	I
Party	Red-Green Alliance	Danish People's Party	Liberal Alliance
Last election	2 seats, 7.0%	1 seat, 4.7%	0 seats, 1.3%
Seats won	2	1	1
Seat change	0	0	▲1
Popular vote	2,907	2,145	1,942
Percentage	8.1%	6.0%	5.4%
Swing	▲1.1%	▲1.3%	▲4.1%
	Seventh party	Eighth party	Ninth party
	V	B	Æ
Party	Venstre	Social Liberals	Denmark Democrats
Last election	1 seat, 5.6%	2 seats, 6.7%	Did not stand
Seats won	1	1	1
Seat change	0	▼1	▲1
Popular vote	1,763	1,527	1,311
Percentage	4.9%	4.3%	3.7%
Swing	▼0.7%	▼2.5%	New
Mayor before election
Benedikte Kiær
Conservatives
Mayor after election
Benedikte Kiær
Conservatives

The 2025 Helsingør Municipal election was held on November 18, 2025, to elect the 25 members to sit in the regional council for the Helsingør Municipal council, in the period of 2026 to 2029. Following the election result, Thomas Holm looked set to become the next mayor. However, a mistake was detected in regards to the counting of votes at Hornbæk Skole, and a recount showed that the parties backing Thomas Holm from the Social Democrats did not have a majority. Following thism Benedikte Kiær from the Conservatives, would secure re-election.

== Background ==
Following the 2021 election, Benedikte Kiær from Conservatives became mayor for her third term. This election was described by Helsingør Dagblad, to likely be a battle between the continuation of Benedikte Kiær or a flip to Thomas Horn from the Social Democrats.

== Electoral system ==
For elections to Danish municipalities, a number varying from 9 to 31 are chosen to be elected to the municipal council. The seats are then allocated using the D'Hondt method and a closed list proportional representation. Helsingør Municipality had 25 seats in 2025.

== Electoral alliances ==
=== Electoral Alliance 1 ===
Party		Political alignment
A	Social Democrats	Centre-left
F	Green Left	Centre-left to Left-wing
Ø	Red-Green Alliance	Left-wing to Far-Left

=== Electoral Alliance 2 ===
Party		Political alignment
B	Social Liberals	Centre to Centre-left
K	Christian Democrats	Centre to Centre-right
M	Moderates	Centre to Centre-right
Å	The Alternative	Centre-left to Left-wing

=== Electoral Alliance 3 ===
Party		Political alignment
C	Conservatives	Centre-right
I	Liberal Alliance	Centre-right to Right-wing
O	Danish People's Party	Right-wing to Far-right
V	Venstre	Centre-right
Æ	Denmark Democrats	Right-wing to Far-right

=== Electoral Alliance 4 ===
Party		Political alignment
E	Borgerforslag	Local politics
Y	Stefan Warburg	Local politics

== Results by polling station ==
Division	A	B	C	E	F	I	K	L	M	O	T	V	Y	Æ	Ø	Å
Division	%	%	%	%	%	%	%	%	%	%	%	%	%	%	%	%
Helsingør Hallen	22.0	3.3	25.5	0.1	13.5	5.5	0.3	2.2	3.1	6.1	0.2	3.6	0.1	3.6	9.8	1.3
Skolen ved Gurrevej	29.2	2.1	20.2	0.3	11.2	4.2	0.3	2.1	2.9	8.4	0.3	2.9	0.1	5.2	9.6	1.1
Laden, Gl. Vapnagård	27.6	3.2	24.4	0.1	11.9	4.5	0.2	1.4	2.3	6.8	0.1	2.5	0.1	4.0	9.4	1.4
Bølgen	18.8	3.2	34.6	0.1	8.7	5.4	0.2	2.7	4.0	5.3	0.1	5.7	0.1	4.1	5.9	1.2
Hornbæk Skole	19.5	5.2	34.3	0.1	8.6	7.0	0.6	1.5	3.3	5.1	0.1	4.7	0.0	2.8	5.1	2.1
Nygård Skole	16.5	3.5	26.0	0.1	9.6	6.2	1.2	1.0	4.3	7.9	0.2	9.5	0.1	6.3	6.3	1.3
Tikøb Skole	11.2	10.4	33.5	0.2	6.0	6.2	0.3	2.0	3.3	6.9	0.1	9.0	0.1	4.0	6.0	0.8
Kvistgård Idrætsanlæg	18.4	5.4	22.7	0.5	12.5	6.9	0.3	3.5	2.7	7.5	0.2	4.8	0.0	6.4	5.5	2.7
Snekkersten Hallen	18.4	5.5	33.9	0.1	11.0	6.0	0.2	1.0	2.9	4.8	0.1	4.8	0.1	3.0	7.1	1.1
Espergærde Bibliotek	16.9	6.2	34.6	0.1	9.9	6.2	0.3	0.9	2.5	3.7	0.1	7.9	0.0	2.2	7.3	1.2
Mørdrupskolen	18.5	5.4	27.7	0.1	11.0	4.9	0.2	2.4	4.6	5.4	0.0	7.5	0.0	3.5	7.4	1.4
Toldkammeret	17.2	4.6	26.0	0.2	16.5	5.4	0.4	1.8	3.3	5.2	0.3	2.7	0.1	1.2	13.4	1.7

== Results ==
Party		Votes	%	+/-	Seats	+/-
Helsingør Municipality
C	Conservatives	10,160	28.30	-6.45	9	-1
A	Social Democrats	7,614	21.21	-4.84	5	-2
F	Green Left	3,982	11.09	+6.01	3	+2
Ø	Red-Green Alliance	2,907	8.10	+1.12	2	0
O	Danish People's Party	2,145	5.97	+1.29	1	0
I	Liberal Alliance	1,942	5.41	+4.15	1	+1
V	Venstre	1,763	4.91	-0.66	1	0
B	Social Liberals	1,527	4.25	-2.47	1	-1
Æ	Denmark Democrats	1,311	3.65	New	1	New
M	Moderates	1,163	3.24	New	1	New
L	Lokaldemokraterne	669	1.86	New	0	New
Å	The Alternative	487	1.36	-1.02	0	0
K	Christian Democrats	110	0.31	New	0	New
T	De Kreative	52	0.14	New	0	New
E	Borgerforslag	46	0.13	New	0	New
Y	Stefan Warburg	26	0.07	New	0	New
Total		35,904	100	N/A	25	N/A
Invalid votes		121	0.23	-0.01		
Blank votes		479	0.92	+0.11		
Turnout		36,504	70.49	+1.92		
Source: valg.dk

== Opinion polls ==
Polling firm	Fieldwork date	Sample size	C	A	Ø	B	V	F	O	Å	I	K	M	Æ	Others	Lead
Epinion	4 Sep - 13 Oct 2025	553	29.5	21.7	8.4	2.7	5.5	11.4	5.4	1.5	9.0	–	0.9	4.1	0.0	7.8
2024 european parliament election	9 Jun 2024		12.1	14.4	7.0	8.2	10.5	19.1	6.4	2.7	7.9	–	8.3	3.4	–	4.7
2022 general election	1 Nov 2022		7.5	27.8	5.3	4.7	10.7	7.7	2.5	4.3	8.4	0.2	10.9	4.7	–	16.9
2021 regional election	16 Nov 2021		31.8	24.5	7.8	7.0	6.4	6.8	4.8	2.5	1.6	0.3	–	–	–	7.3
2021 municipal election	16 Nov 2021		34.7 (10)	26.0 (7)	7.0 (2)	6.7 (2)	5.6 (1)	5.1 (1)	4.7 (1)	2.4 (0)	1.3 (0)	–	–	–	–	8.7
