= Skibsklarerergaarden =

Historic building in Elsinore, Denmark

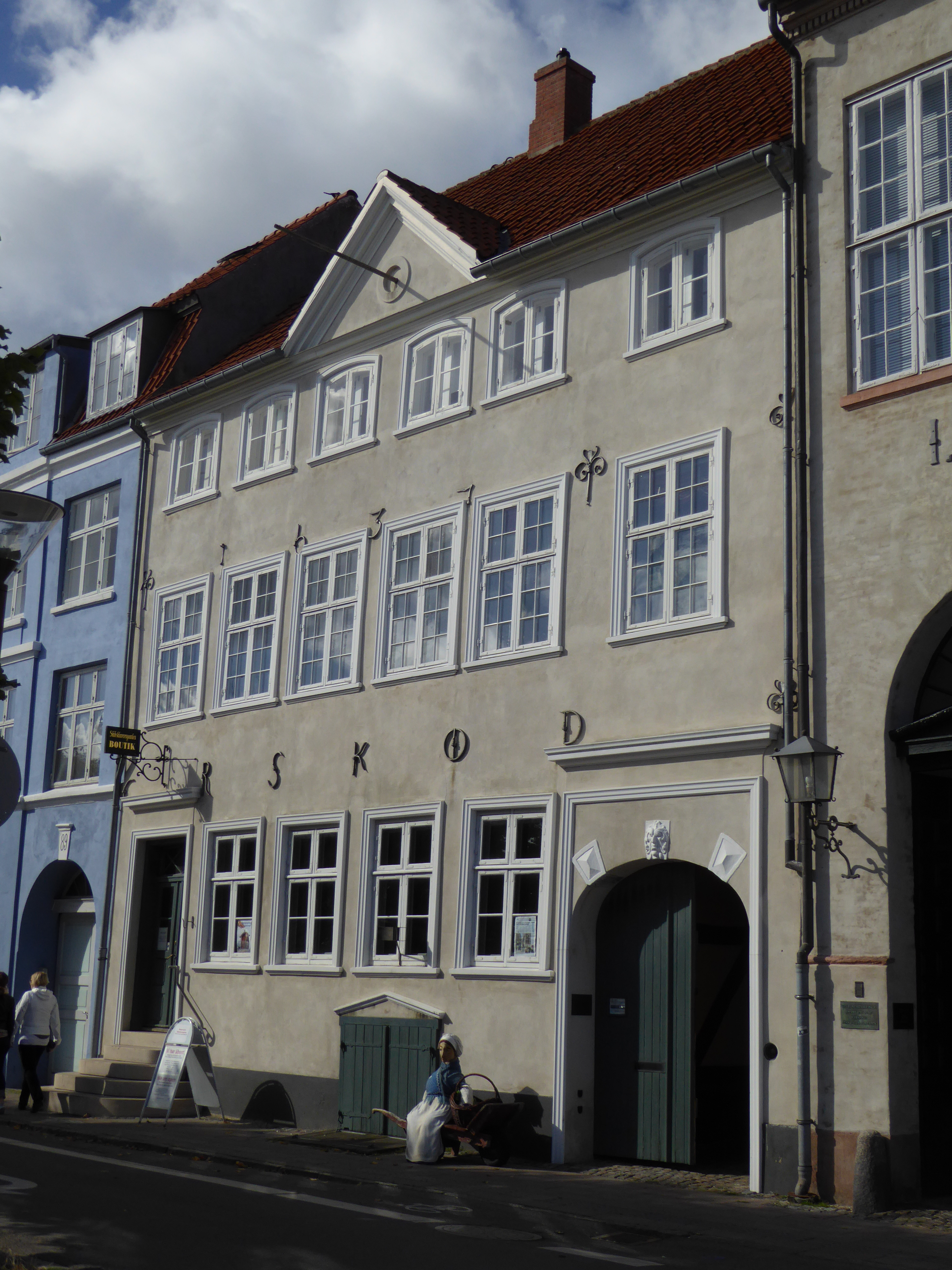
- The façade on Strandgade
- Established: 1995
- Location: Helsingør, Denmark
- Coordinates: 56.0348°N 12.6151°E
- Website: Official website

Skibsklarerergaarden, literally "The Ship Handler's House"), is a historic house museum and listed building situated on Strandgade in Helsingør, Denmark. A "ship handler" handled the paperwork at Øresund Custom House for captains in connection with Denmark's collection of Sound Dues from all ships that passed through the Øresund. The Sound Duty was collected on and off between 1429 and 1857 and was one of Denmark's most important sources of income as well as a major cause of local prosperity in Helsingør. The ground floor of the building contains a Ship-chandler with Denmark's oldest surviving shop interior. The building is also known as Rasmussens Gård.

== History ==
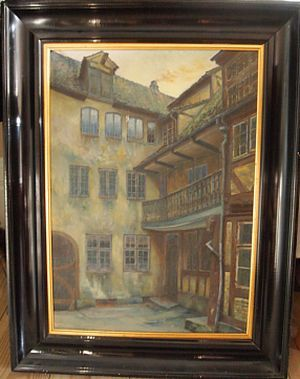
The courtyard in the 1920s.

The house dates from the 16th century but was adapted in 1781. Christian Simmelkier opened the Ship-chandler in 1809. The building was acquired by Ove Elling Galschiøt in 1823.

Restaurateur Søren Fisker acquired the building in 1993 and the ground floor was subsequently restored by experts from the National Museum before opening as a museum in 1995. In 2000, the property was acquired by Bjarne Rasmussen who renovated the upper floors and made them available to the museum.

== Building ==
The ship's chandler feature much of its original furniture and fittings as well as artifacts from similar establishments in Helsingør. Next to the ship-chandler is the so-called Captain's Room (Danish: Skipperstuen) where captains could pass the time with food and drink while waiting for the bill from Øresund Custom House as well as their supplies to be made ready. To its rear is the former office of the ship commissioner. The main floor contains the private residence of the ship handler. The upper floor contained lodging for captains that waited for their papers to be ready and favourable winds for onwards voyage. A gate in the building on Strandgade opens to a yard. The rear wing contained a brewery.

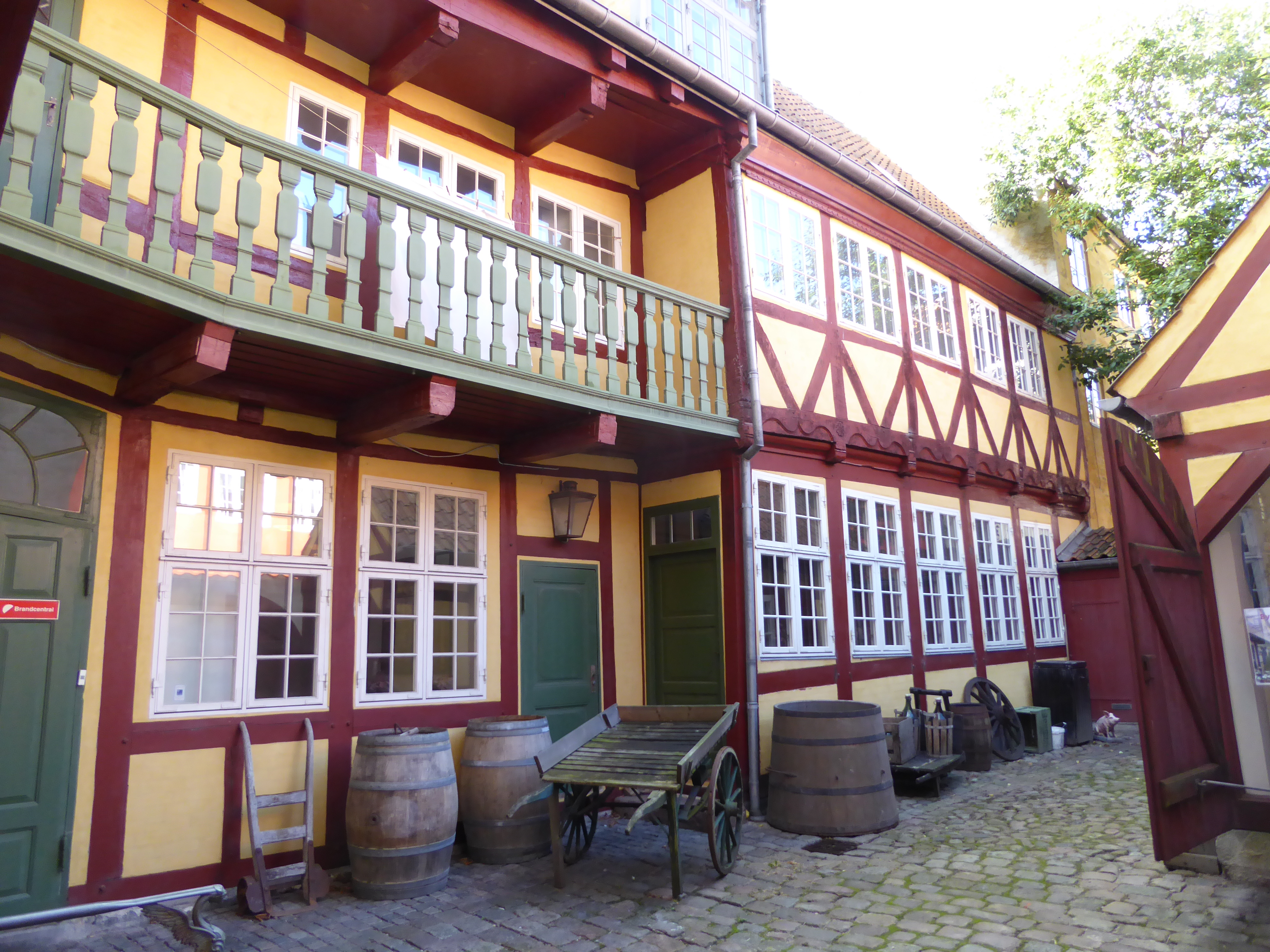
The brewery wing.

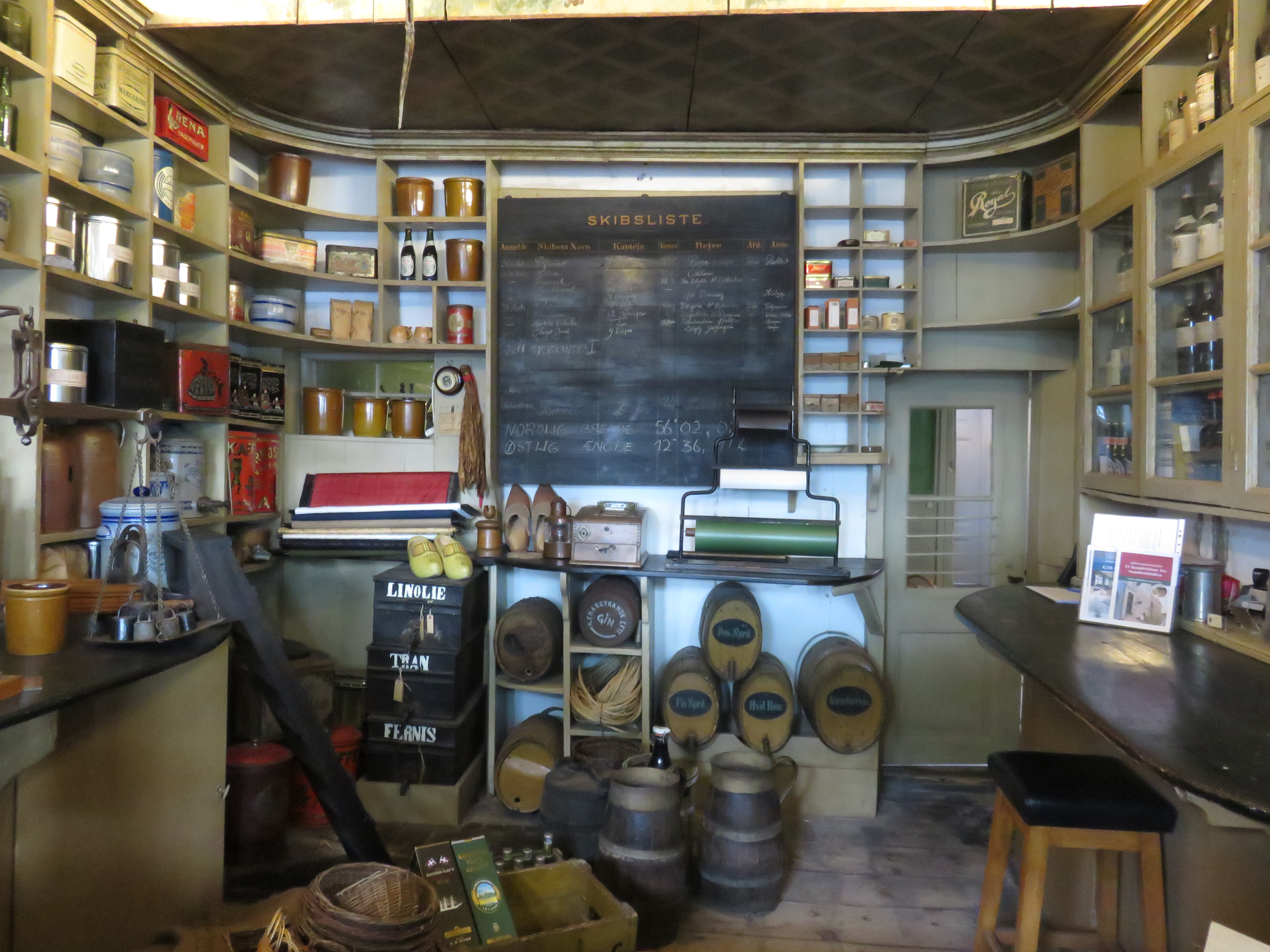
The supply shop on the ground floor

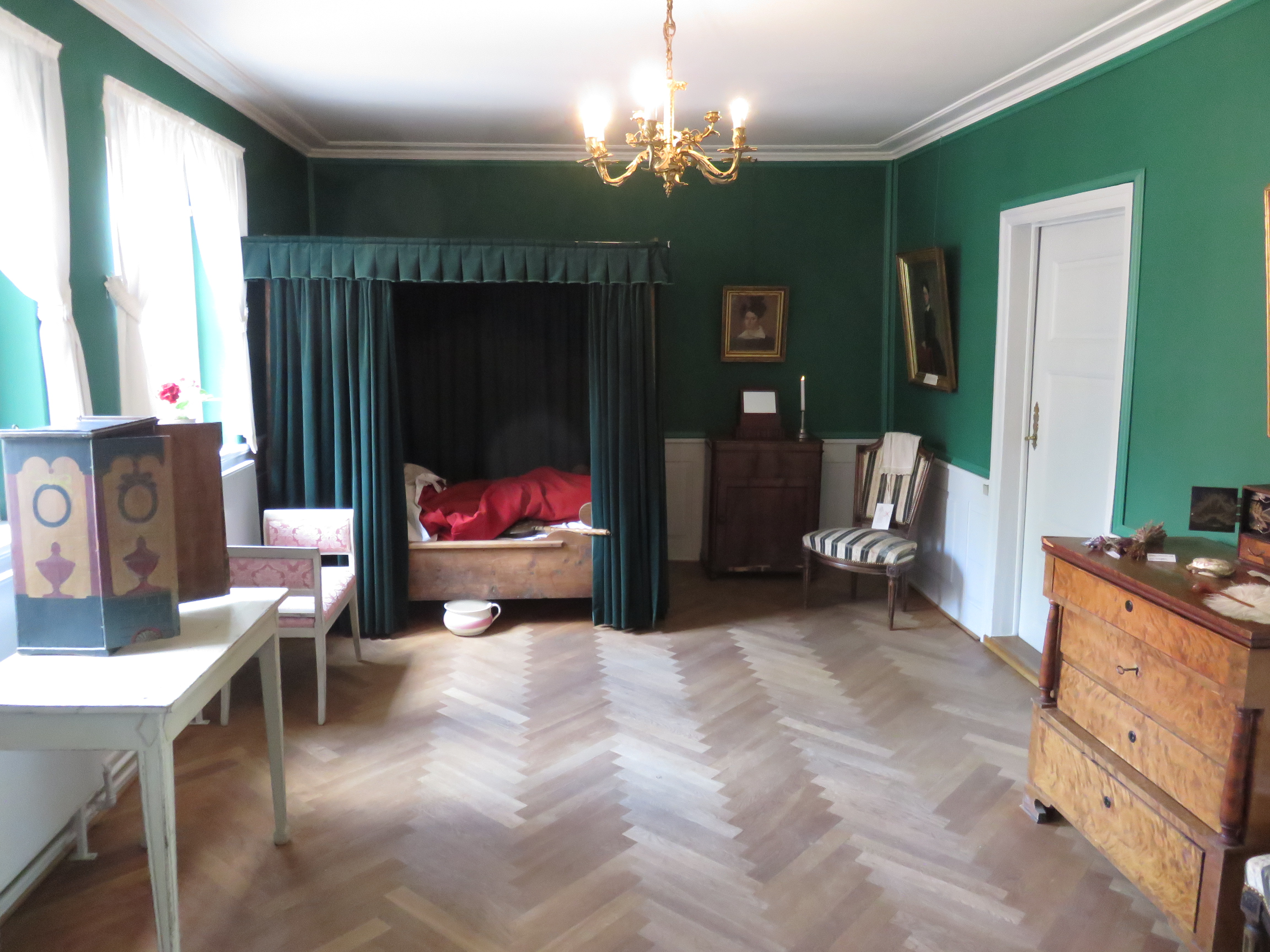
Part of the shipping agent's private residence on the first floor

== See also ==
- Helsingør City Museum
