= Gurrevejsstiftelsen =

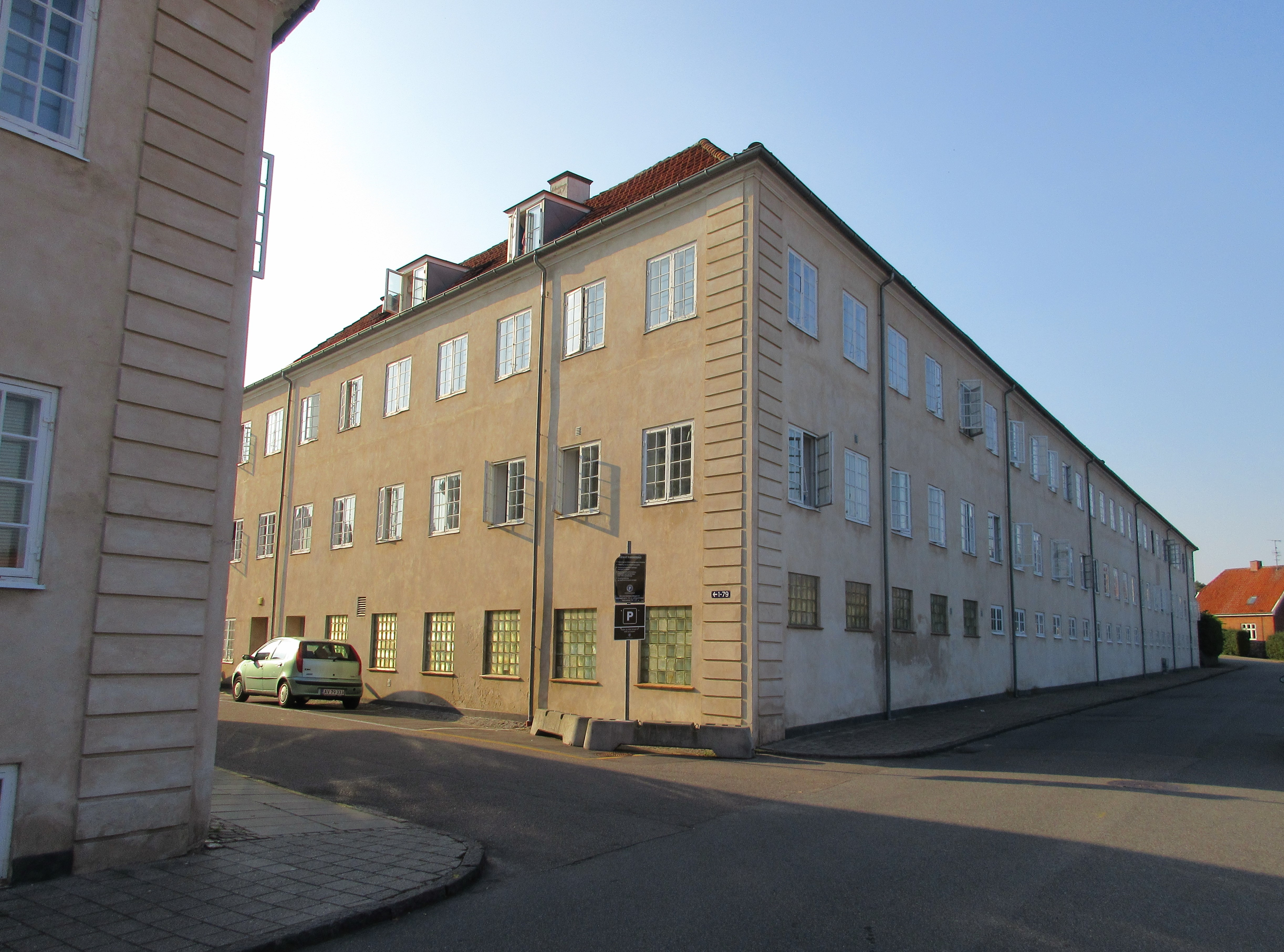
- Interactive map of the Gurrevejsstiftelsen area

General information
- Location: Helsingør, Denmark
- Coordinates: 56°2′10.65″N 12°35′44.6″E
- Construction started: 1918
- Completed: 1921
- Client: Helsingør Municipality

Design and construction
- Architect: oPoul Holsøe

Gurrevejsstiftelsen, also known as Helsingør Kommunes Alderdomsstiftelse, is a residential complex for senior citizens in Helsingør, Denmark. Built in 1918–1921 to design by Poul Holsøe, it is an early manifestation of the emerging welfare state and became a model for similar projects. It was listed in 1995.

== History ==
At the turn of the 20th century, the poorhouse in the Cammelite House (now Helsingør City Museum was still the only option for elderly people in need of care. It was closed in 1902 and the approximately 70 residents were transferred to premises with slightly better living conditions at Fiolgade 13. A new senior citizens home was established in the former Hotel Helsingør's building at Hestemøllestræde 6. It had room for 20 residents and offered somewhat better conditions than in the poorhouse.

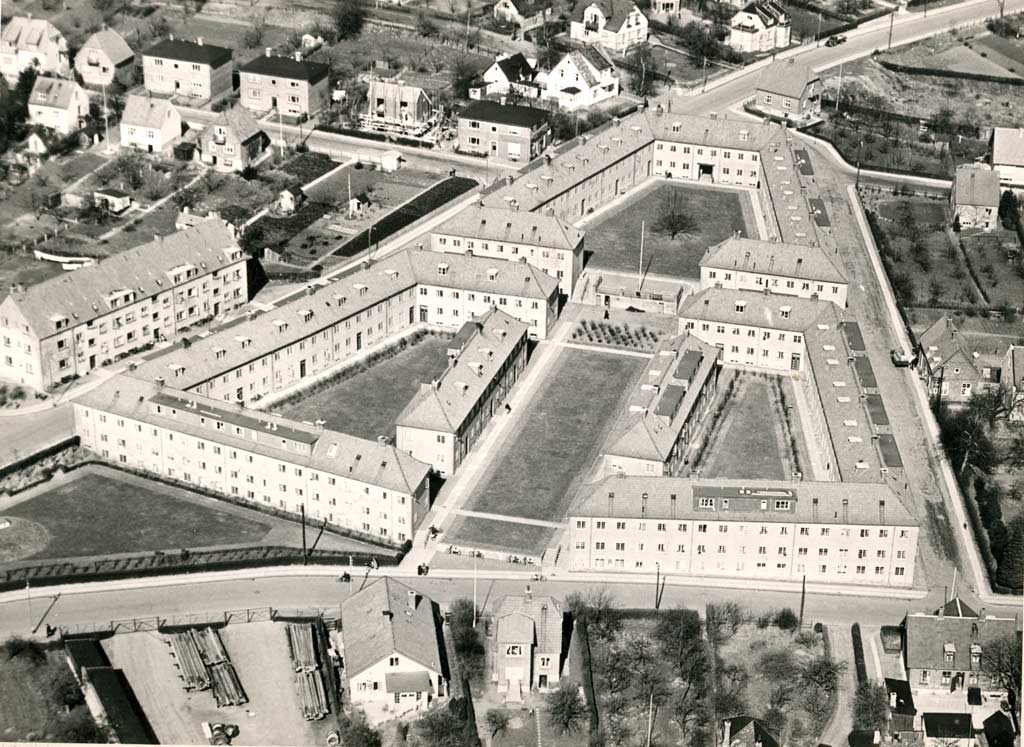
Aerual of Gurrevejsstiftelsen in the 1960s

In 1913, Helsingør Municipality acquired the former entertainment venue Hammershøj which was subsequently converted into a new senior citizens home, which replaced the institution in Hestemøllestræde on its completion in 1915. Helsingør Alderdomshjem or Hammershøj, as it was now called, was expanded in 1919 and again, with 28 individual apartments, in 1920.

The development was created as the first major initiative of mayor Peder Christensen. The complex was designed by Poul Holsøe. The project also comprised land for small gardens where the residents could grow their own vegetables. Construction began inn 1918 and was completed in 1921. The development was progressive for its time and became a model for later projects in both Denmark and abroad. It was listed in 1996.

== Architecture ==
Gurrevejsstiftelsen consists of three open blocks occupying a gently sloping, trapezoid site between Gurrevej Bnarkesvej and Bragesvej. The lower side fronting Gurrevej has three floors while the upper side fronting Bjarkesvej is only two floors tall. The development is built to a simple Neoclassical design with white facades with corner Lesenes and red tile roofs. It contained 160 individual apartments, consisting of living room, sleapong room, kitchen and toilet.

== Image gallery ==
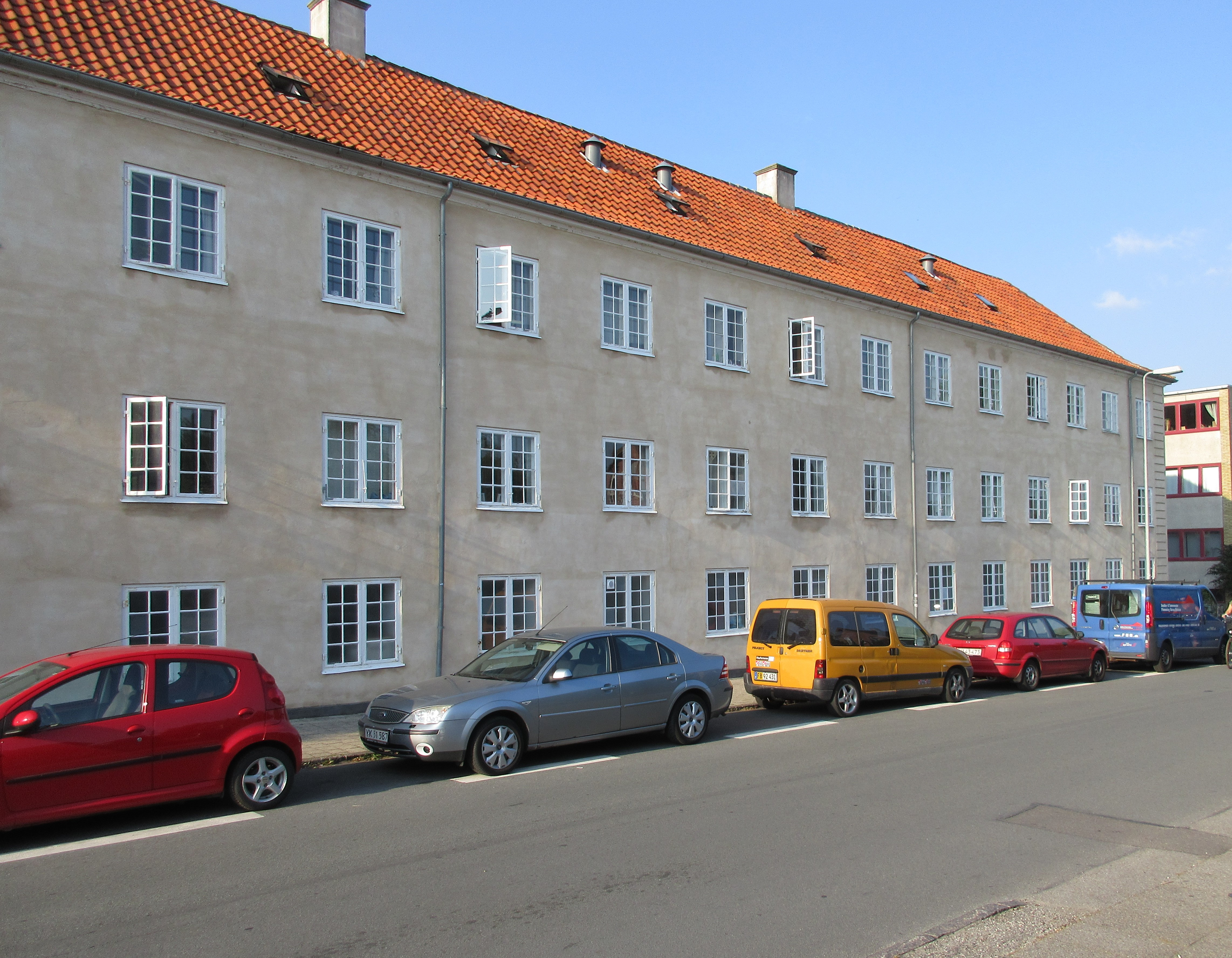
The three-storey side fronting Gurrevej

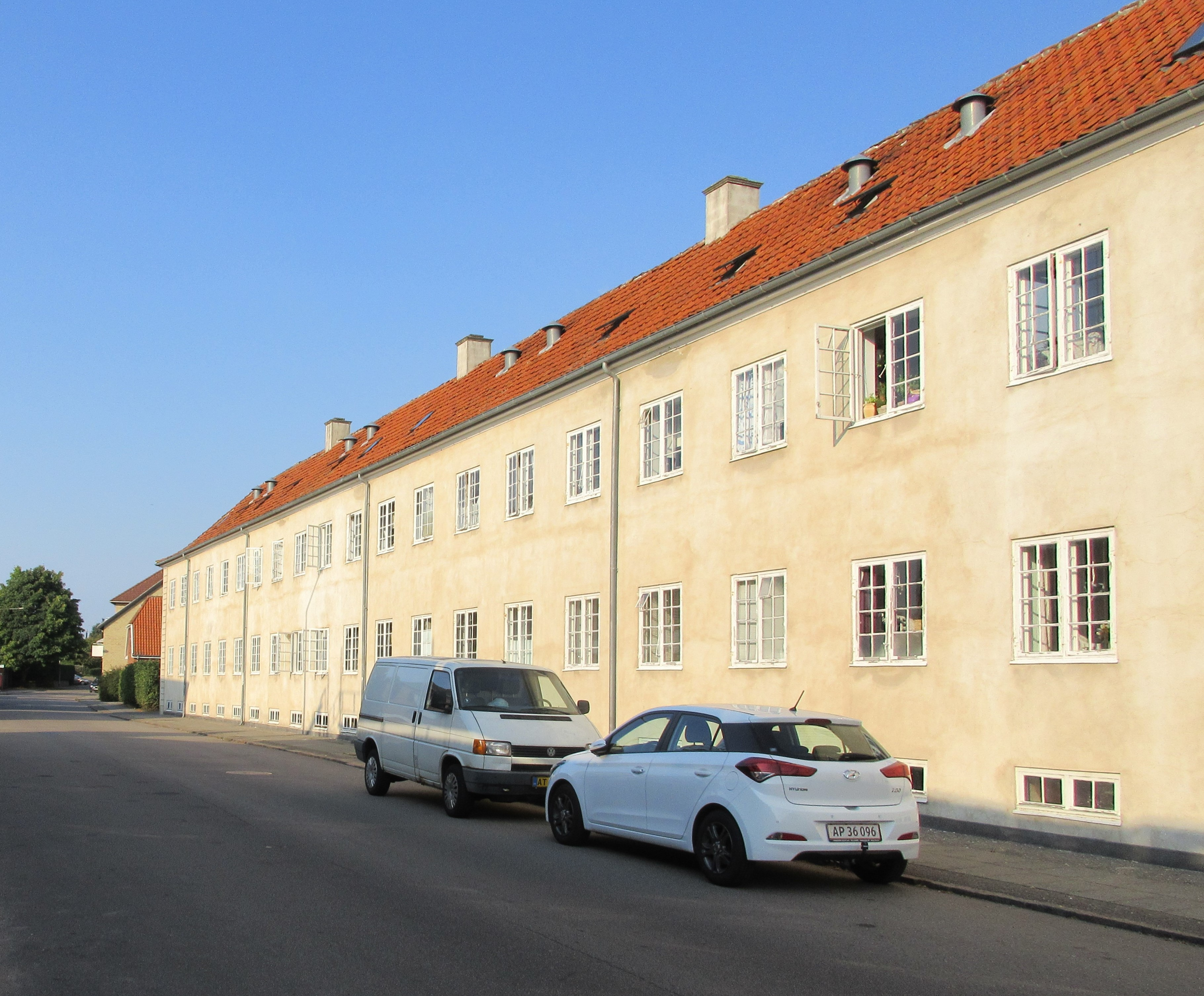
The two-stoey, "upper" side fronting Bjarkesvej

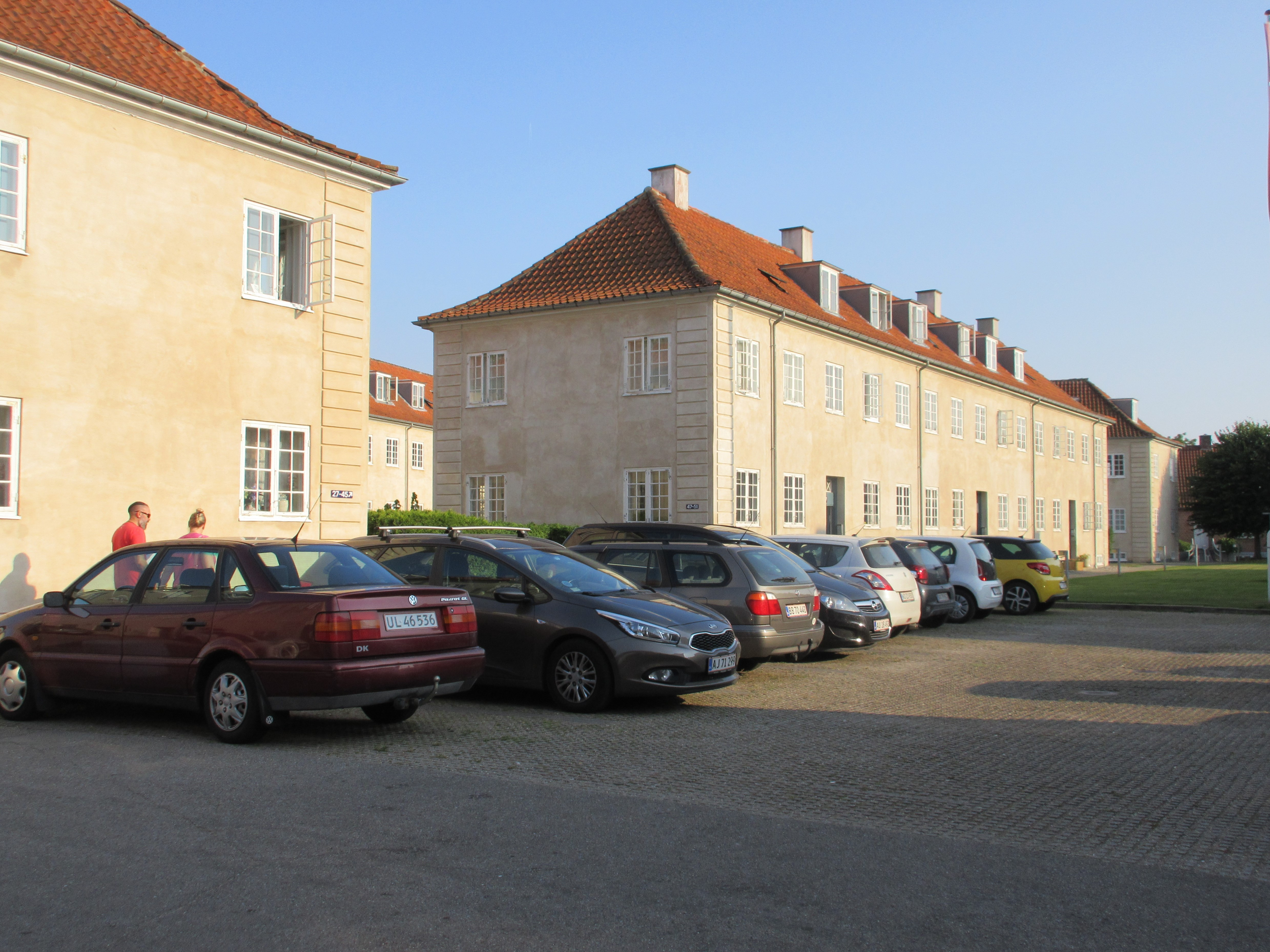
