= Flynderupgård =

Former country house in the Espergærde, Helsingør, Denmark

Coordinates: 56.0045°N 12.5551°E

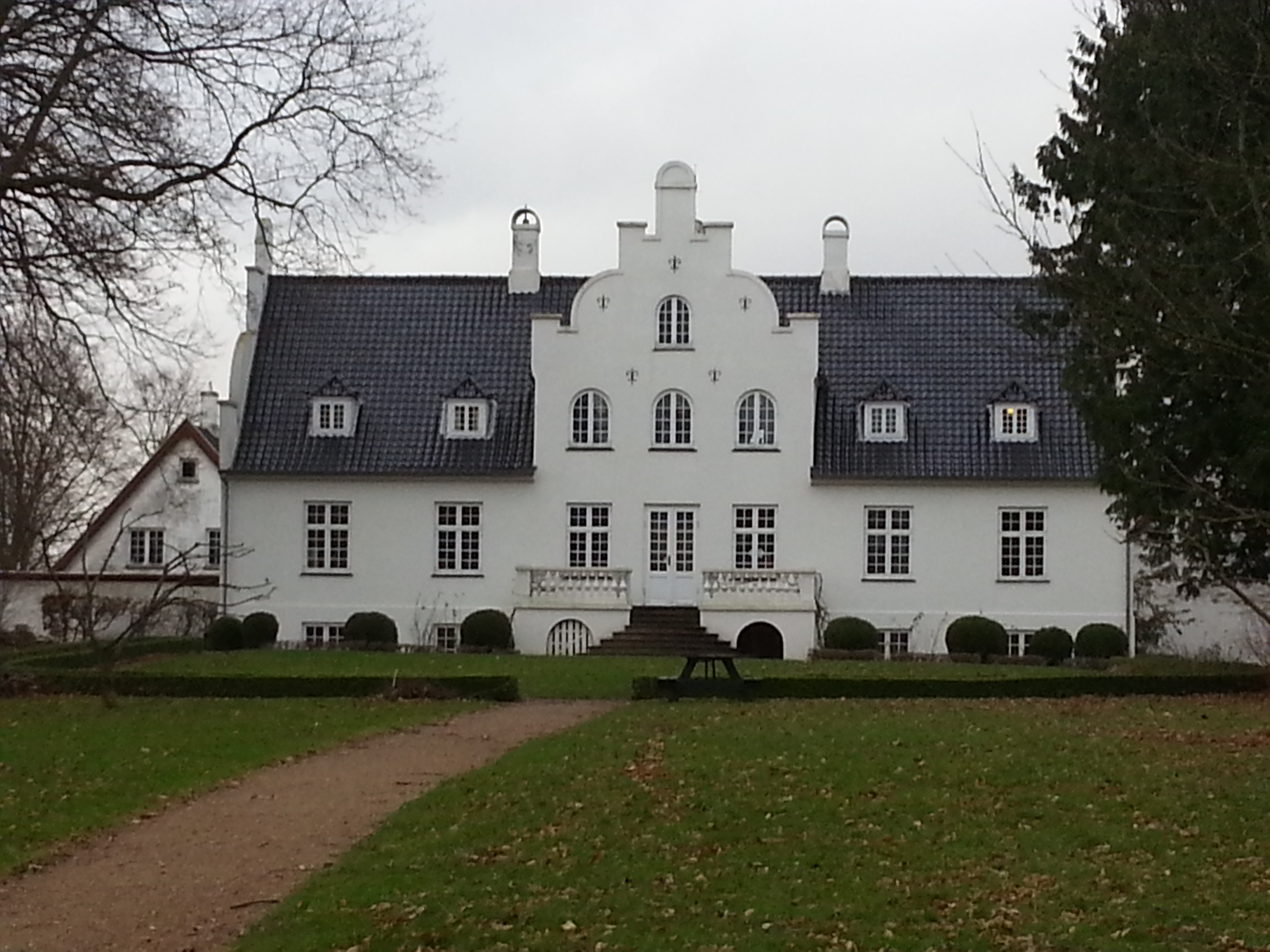
Flynderupgård in winter

Flynderupgård is a former country house in the Espergærde district of Helsingør, Denmark. It is now part of Helsingør Museums dedicated to the non-urban parts of the municipality with its farming communities, farmland, forestry and fishing villages. The outdoor premises comprises traditional breeds of farm animals, cultivation of a five hectares piece of land and a garden, all as it would appear in the 1920s.

== History ==
Flynderupgård was originally a farm but was converted into a country house in the beginning of the 19th century. The main building was adapted in its current style in 1915–20.

== Exhibition ==
The museum comprises two large local collections. One is a collections of artifacts compiled by teacher at Rspergærde School Arne Meyling in the period between 1954 and the 1970s. The other is a collection of artefacts aelated to fishing which was donated to the museum by architect Per Christiansen.

The main building contains a recreation of a historic grocery store as well as a living room. The museum also arranges special exhibitions several times a year.

== Garden ==
The garden is a recreation of the garden as it would appear in the 1920s. In association with the garden is a sculpture walk as well as several free-standing sculptures by the sculptor Karl Otto Johansen.

== Frilandskulturcentret Flynderupgård ==
In association to the museum is Frilandskulturcentret Flynderupgård which keeps farm animals and cultivates a five hectares piece of land in the same way as it was done in the 1920s. The farm animals are all traditional Danish breeds such as such as Rød Dansk Malkerace cattle Dansk Landrace pig and.

== Cultural references ==
The building was used as a location in the films 5 Raske piger (1933), De bør forelske Dem (1935), and Plat eller krone (1937).

== List of owners ==
- [1803-1810) Konsul Simon de Borserondo
- (1810–1822) Johan Henrik Permin
- (1822-1822) Pastor Schive
- (1822–1835) Brygger Randrup
- (1835–1839) Overretsprokurator Frederik Ferdinand Hansen
- (1839–1841) Kirurg Johan C.L. Pabset
- (1841–1849) Krigsråd Theil
- (1849–1850) Julius Esche
- (1850–1856) Christian Schmidt
- (1856–1859) Jørgen Rasmussen
- (1869–1895) Grosserer Johan Nicolaj Amnitzbøll
- (1895–1900) Hermann Jacob Vallentin Stahl
- (1900–1915) Fabrikant Emil Th. Falck
- (1915–1929) Grosserer Rasmussen
- (1929–1044)r Svend Nielsen
- (1944–1978) Landsretssagfører Chr. Frederiksen
- (1978–present) nu Helsingør Municipality
