= Benedikte Kiær =

Danish politician (born 1969)

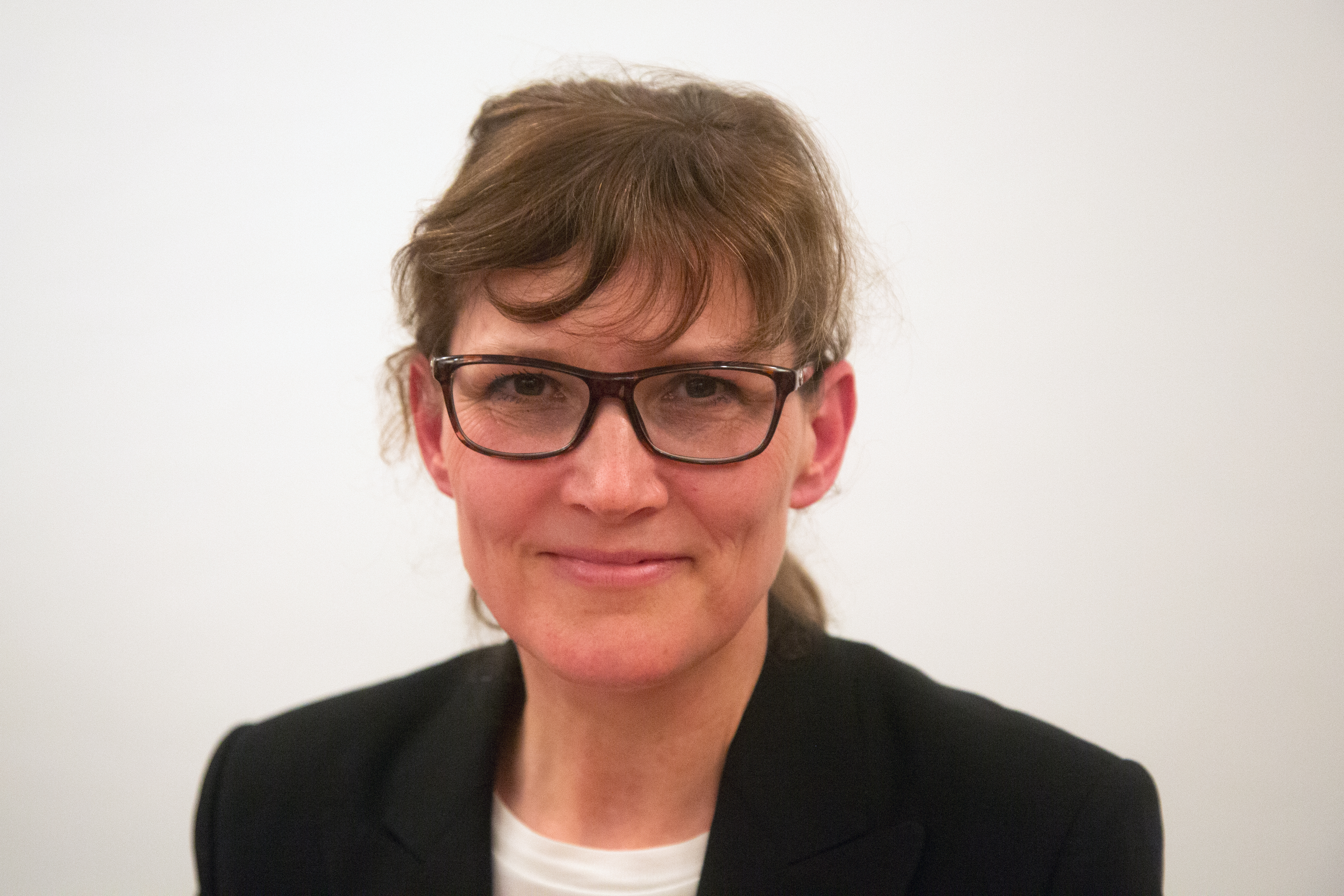
Benedikte Kiær

Benedikte Kiær (born 10 December 1969) is a Danish politician. From 2010 to 2011 she was Minister of Social Affairs in Lars Løkke Rasmussen's cabinet. She belongs to the Conservative People's Party.

Kiær has degrees in chemistry and political science from the University of Copenhagen.

Since 1 January 2014 she has been the mayor of Helsingør Municipality.

She ran for a fourth term as mayor in the 2025 election. Following the election result, Thomas Holm from the Social Democrats looked set to become the next mayor. However, a mistake was detected in regards to the counting of votes at Hornbæk Skole, and a recount showed that the parties backing Holm did not have a majority. Following this, Kiær secured reelection.

Political offices
Preceded by Karen Ellemann (as Minister of the Interior and Social Affairs)	Minister of Social Affairs; 2010–2011	Succeeded by Karen Hækkerup
