= Helsingør City Museum =

Museum in Helsingør, Denmark

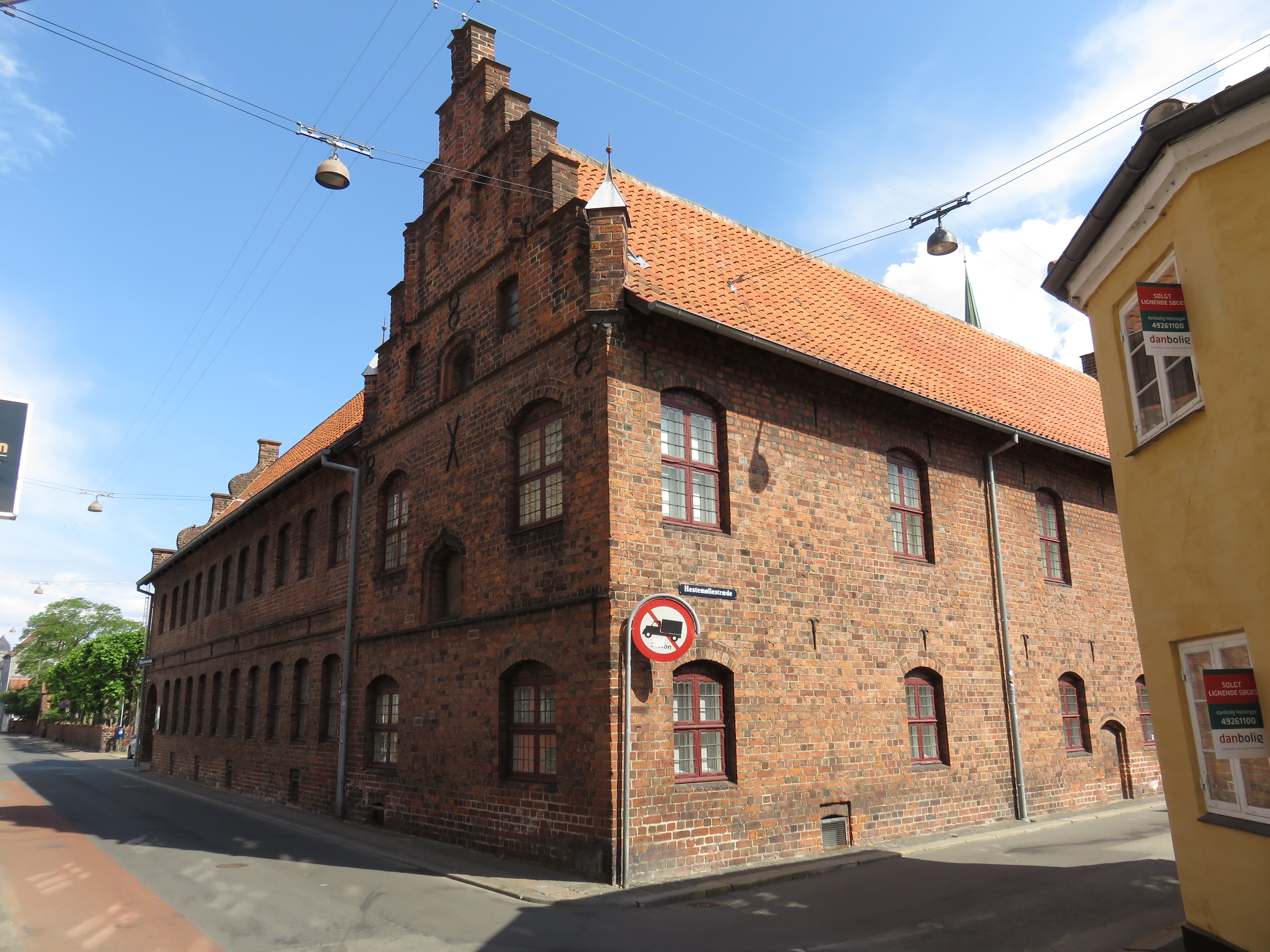
- Established: 1973; 53 years ago
- Location: Sct. Anna Gade 36, Helsingør, Denmark
- Coordinates: 56.036369°N 12.612594°E

Helsingør City Museum (Danish: Helsingør Bymuseum) is a local history museum in Helsingør Denmark. The 16th-century building in which it is based is known as the Cammelite House (Danish: Kammelitterhuset) although the Carmelite brothers from the adjacent Priory of Our Lady have in fact only built a minor part of the build.

== History ==
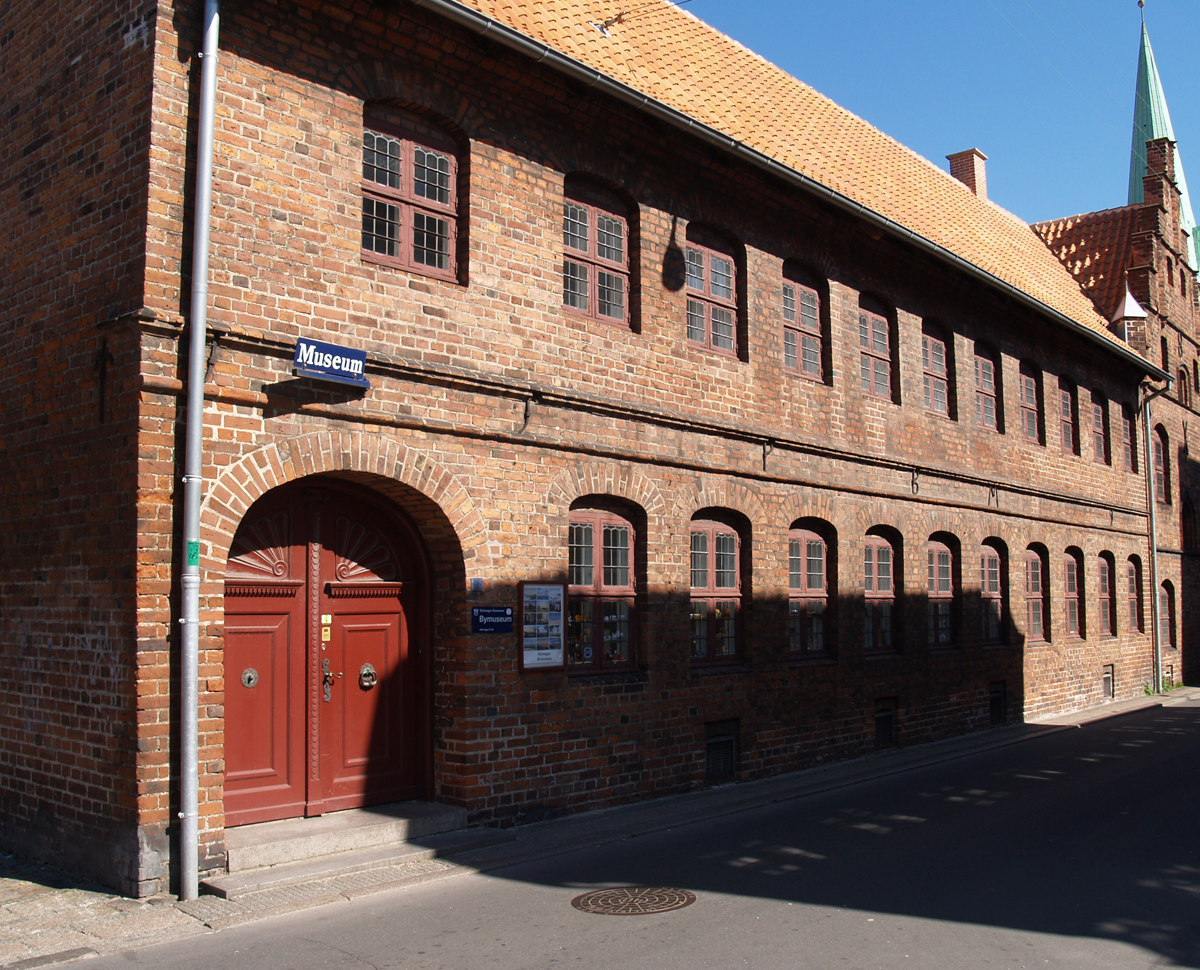
Entrance to the museum

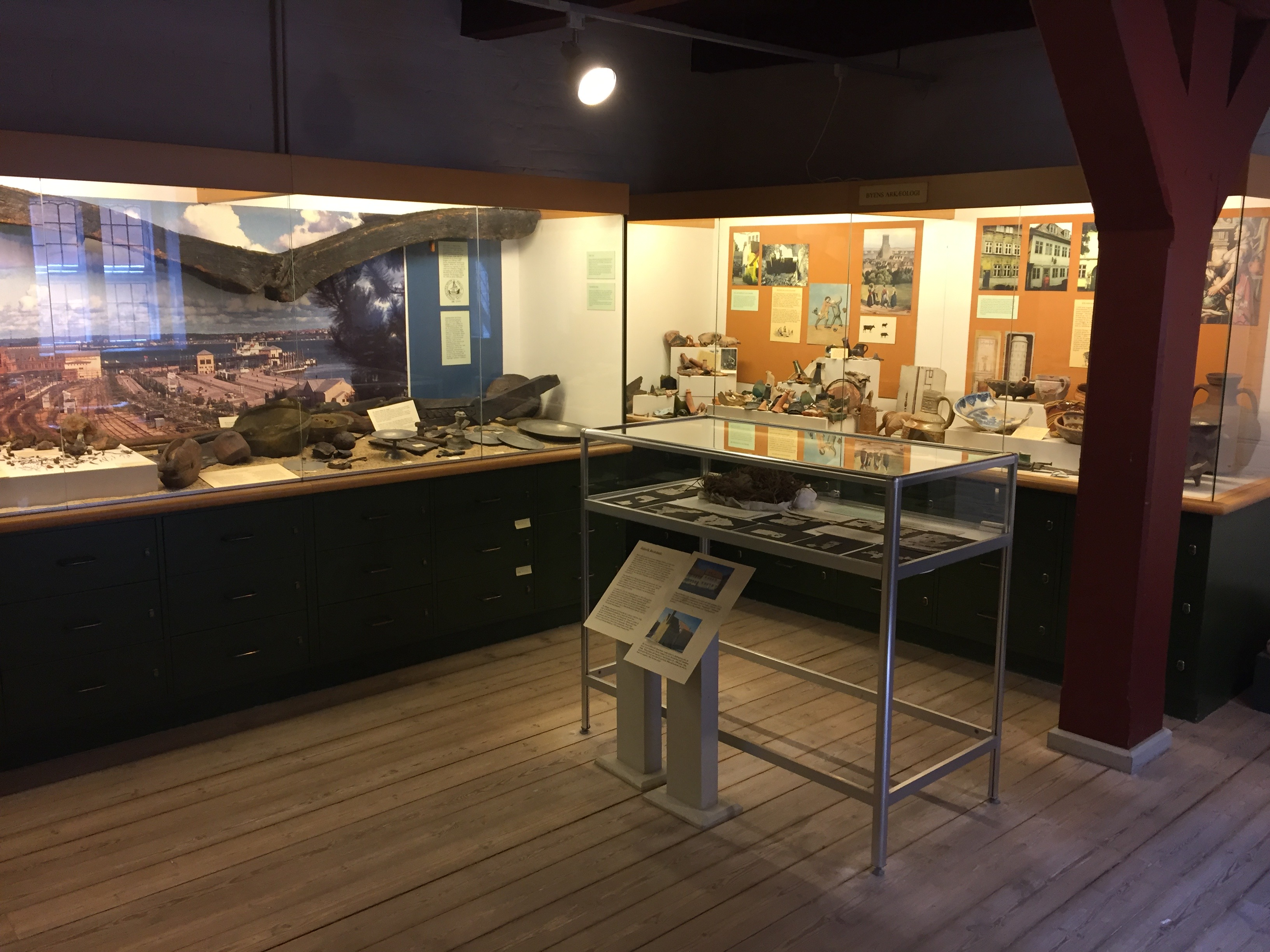
Interior display of artifacts

On 11 July 1516, Christian II of Denmark granted the brothers at Helsingør's Carmelite Priory permission to build a hospital for "poor, sick foreign seamen for rest and something, help and comfort". The building, located on present day Hestemøllestræde to the south of the priory's chapel, was 25 and contained 8–M10 beds. After the dissolution of the priory in 1536 during the Reformation, the Carmelites were turned out. The hospital was sold to Asgud Mikkelsen who constructed a horse mill at the site. Herluff Trolle, who had become Seignor of Krogen in 1544, acquired the property in 1550. He extended the one-storey hospital building westwards with a two-storey townhouse. It is likely that Trolle intended to expand the house further but he left Helsingør when he was appointed to Seignor of Copenhagen Castle in 1561. The house in Helsingør was instead granted by Herluff and Birgitte Trolle to the city's grammar school.

In 1686, the king granted the mayor and city council permission to sell the building to a member of the donators' family to raise money for the school. In 1598, it was sold to Peder Brahe, whose wife, Margrethe Gøye, was a niece of Birgitte Gøye. They expanded the house with the west wing on Sankt Anna Gade in 1592. The city acquired the Brahe House as it was then known in 1630 and turned it into its new poorhouse. In 1632, the old hospital building was expanded to the same height as Trolle's house. The poorhouse was later expanded with a half-timbered north and west wing, turning it into a four-winged complex with a central courtyard. In 1761, 71 people lived in the building and by 1845 the number had increased to 96. The south wing as from 1805 until 1841 used as a school for the poor with up to 120 pupils. The poorhouse was decommissioned in 1902. Helsingør City Museum took over the building in 1973. It had previously been based in Marienlyst Castle.

== Exhibition ==
The museum contains a large model of Helsingør as it appeared in 1801. The museum also contains various exhibitions about the city's history and paintings with local provenance. The museum is also notable for its well-preserved Renaissance Hall on the first floor.

== Affiliations ==
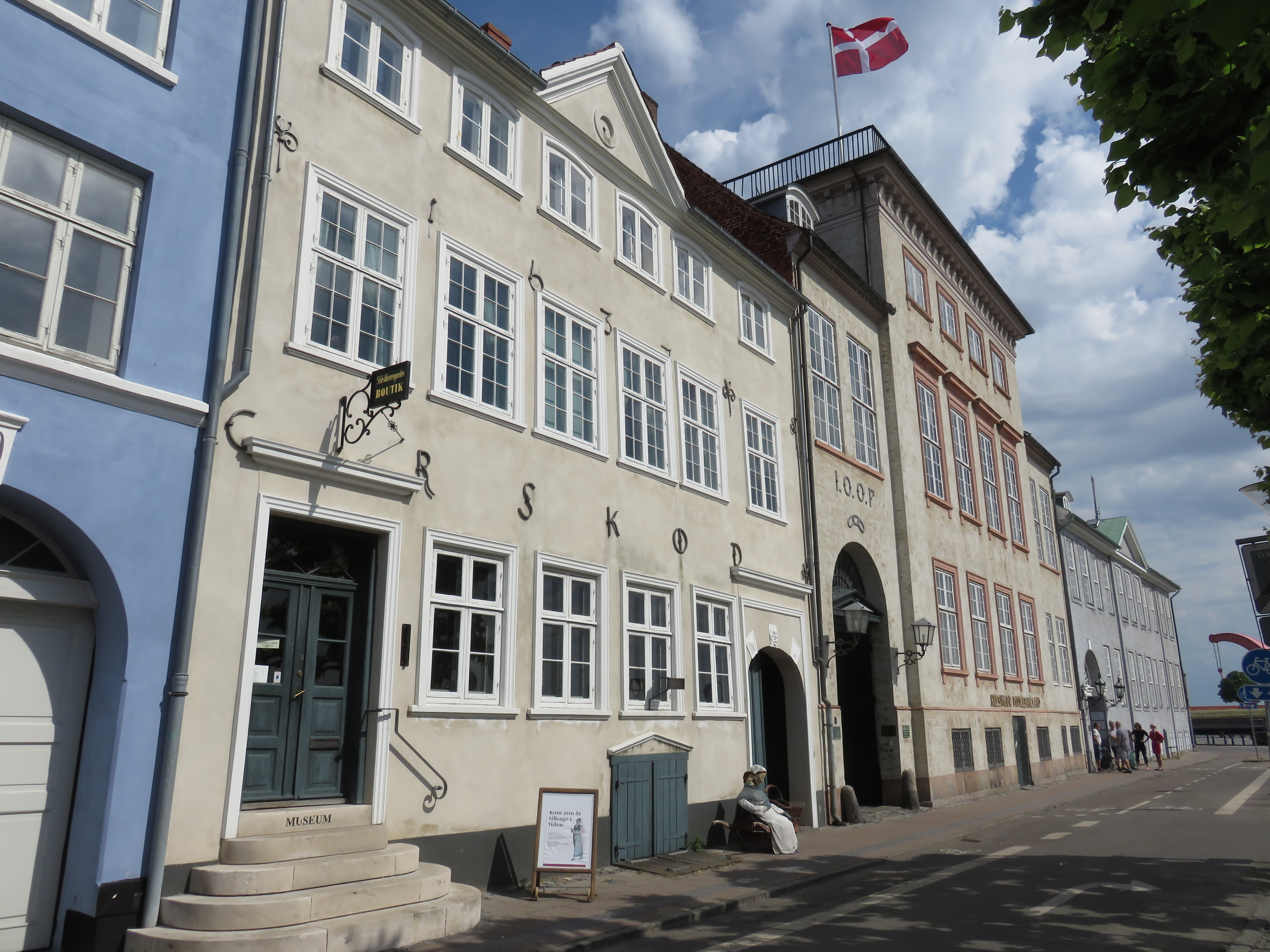
Skibsklarerergaarden (Shipping Agent's House Museum)

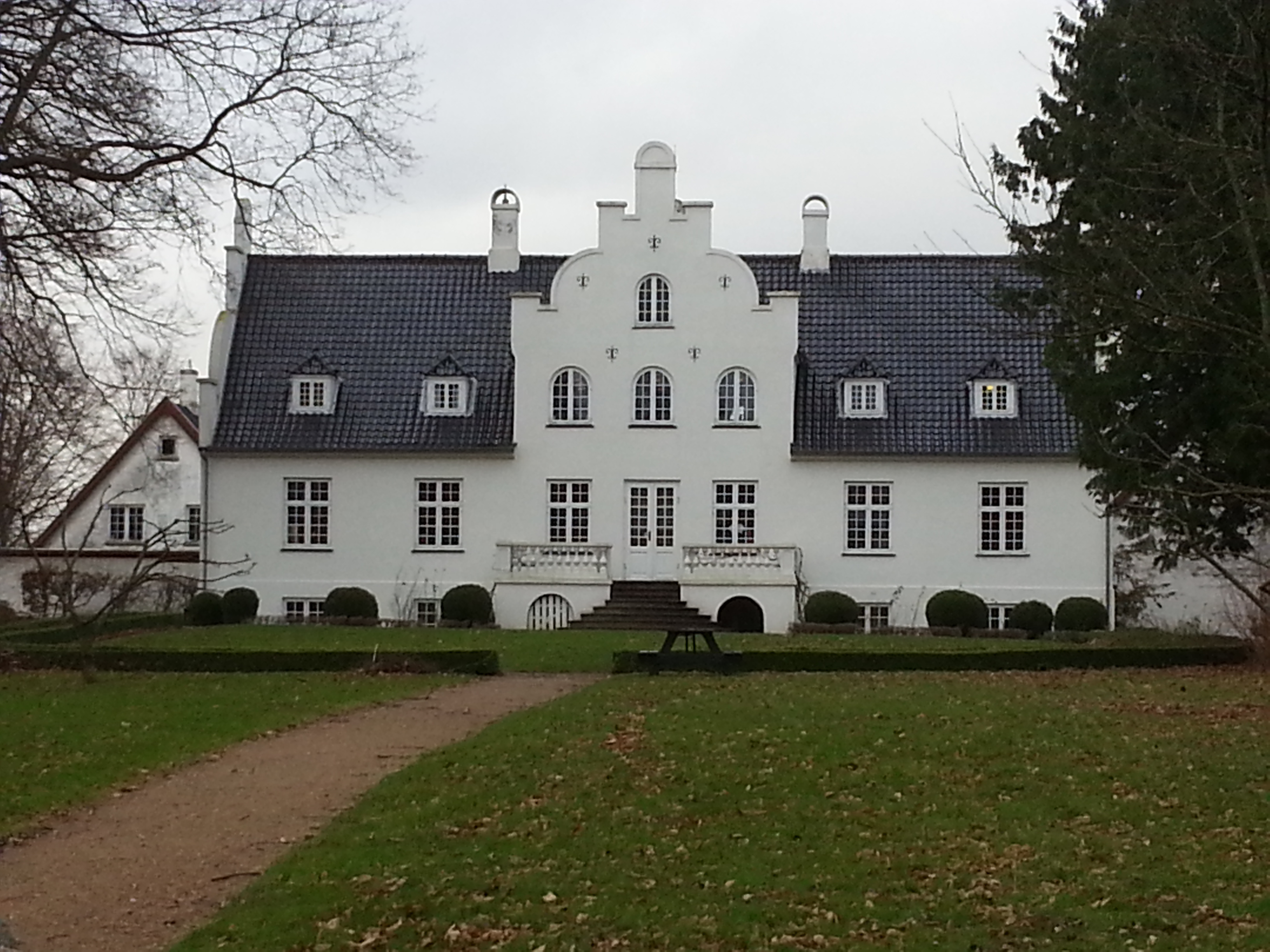
Flynderupgård

Helsingør City Museum is now part of Helsingør Kommunes Museer (Helsingør Municipal Museums) which also comprises three other museums in Helsingør:

- Skibsklarerergaarden is a historic house museum from the 1780s which is dedicated to Helsingør's role in Denmark's collection of Sound Dues from all ships that passed through the Øresund.
- The museum at Flynderupgård, a former country estate in Espergærde whose current main building dates from 1920, is dedicated to the rural history of the area as well as the history of the old fishing communities on the coast to the south and north of Helsingør. Various old Danish breeds of farm animals, such as Danish Red cattle and Dansk Landrace pigs, are also kept on the farm which is also cultivated with traditional crops.
- The Dockyard Museum (Værftsmuseet) is based at Kulturværftet at is dedication to the 100-year history of Helsingør Dockyard which for many years was Helsing'rs largest employer.
