= Christiansborg Palace (1st) =

Palace in Copenhagen, Denmark, 1745–1794

Coordinates: 55.6763°N 12.5806°E

First Christiansborg Palace
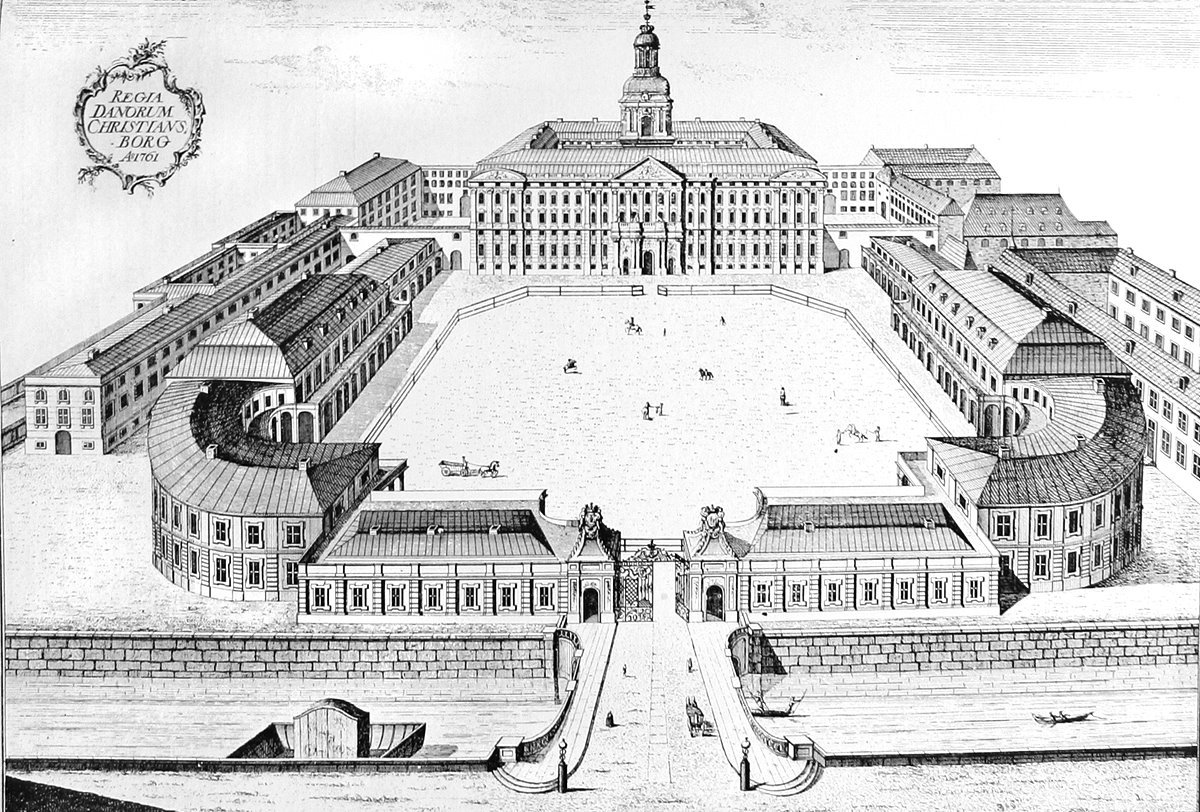
- First Christiansborg Palace
- Interactive map of the First Christiansborg Palace area

General information
- Architectural style: Rococo
- Location: Copenhagen, Denmark
- Construction started: 1733
- Completed: 1745
- Demolished: 1794
- Cost: 2,700,000 Rigsdaler
- Client: Christian VI

Design and construction
- Architect: Elias David Häusser

The first Christiansborg Palace in Copenhagen, Denmark, was built on Slotsholmen in 1745 as a new main residence for King Christian VI of Denmark-Norway. It was built on the same site as its predecessor, Copenhagen Castle, which had assumed a monstrous appearance and started to crumble under its own weight after several extensions.

The palace existed for just under half a century since it was almost completely destroyed by a fire in 1794. The surviving parts, which included the show grounds, the court theatre and the Marble Bridge with its two pavilions, were incorporated into the second Christiansborg Palace which succeeded it. These parts also survived the fire of 1884 which destroyed the second palace and are now part of the present day Christiansborg Palace which houses both the Danish Parliament, Supreme Court and Prime Minister's Office.

== History ==
=== Construction of the new palace ===
Demolition of the overextended and antiquated Copenhagen Castle began in 1731 to make room for the new palace which was named Christiansborg after its founder. The king commissioned architect Elias David Häusser to build the new palace.

Construction of the magnificent new palace began in 1733. The structure was intended to be a grand square Baroque palace complete with stables, a court theatre, and a palace church. Reflecting the grandeur of an absolute monarchy, the new Christiansborg became Northern Europe’s largest palace with 348 rooms designed to accommodate about 1000 people of the Royal Court.

From 1736, younger architects Lauritz de Thurah and Nicolai Eigtved took over the interior design. In 1738, a palace commission was established to oversee the construction, which faced financial difficulties and slow progress. Despite these challenges, by 1740 parts of the palace were ready for use, and Christian VI moved in on 26 November 1740.

Upon Häusser's retirement in 1742, Eigtved was tasked with completing the palace, which he did by 1745. The palace commission was dissolved on 22 February 1745.

The total cost of the new palace was 2.7 million Rigsdaler, half of the state's annual income.

=== The fire of 1794 ===
On 26 February 1794, a fire broke out at Christiansborg Palace, originating from an overheated stove near the Grand Hall. The fire led to the destruction of the palace, with only a few parts surviving, such as the Royal Stables and the court theatre. Following the fire, the King moved to Amalienborg Palace, and the construction of a new palace was delayed due to several national crises.

== Architecture and artworks ==
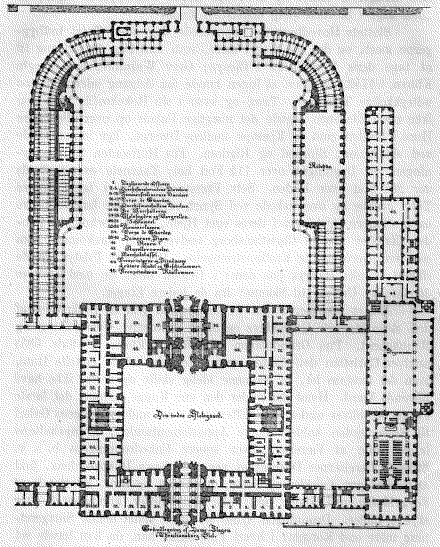
Plan drawing of the first Christiansborg

=== Overall layout ===
The palace complex, which was in Rococo style, consisted of a four-winged main building connected to various other buildings, including a court theatre and stables, arranged around large show grounds. There was also an attached chapel located at the site of the present-day Christiansborg Chapel. It was the largest palace in Europe for a short while, until the fire destroyed it.

The main approach to the palace was across the still existing Marble Bridge, today located on the rear side of present-day Christiansborg, and the show grounds.

=== Main building ===
The main building stood 36 metres high with a copper-clad roof and an 84 metre high steepled tower located above the main entrance facing the show grounds. The façade was covered in sandstone and lavishly decorated with vases, reliefs, sculptures and ornamental details on cornices and window frames.

The interior was also in Rococo style and lavishly decorated. Work on producing artworks and decorations for the palace continued throughout the reign of Frederick V, and the Grand Hall, which was designed by Nicolas-Henri Jardin, was not inaugurated until 10 November 1766 by Christian VII. Among the artists who had their breakthrough with their contributions to the palace are the painters Nikolaj Abildgaard and Hendrick Krock and the sculptors Johannes Wiedewelt, Simon Stanley and Johan Mandelberg.
