= Pehr Hörberg =

Swedish artist (1746–1816)

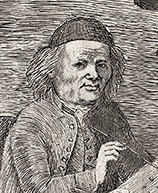
- Selfportrait
- Born: January 31, 1746; Virestad, Småland, Sweden
- Died: January 24, 1816 (aged 69); Risinge, Östergötland
- Education: Konstakademien, Stockholm
- Known for: Painting, etchings, engravings, woodcuts, tapestries musician, composer, altar-pieces, religious, mythological and historical motifs

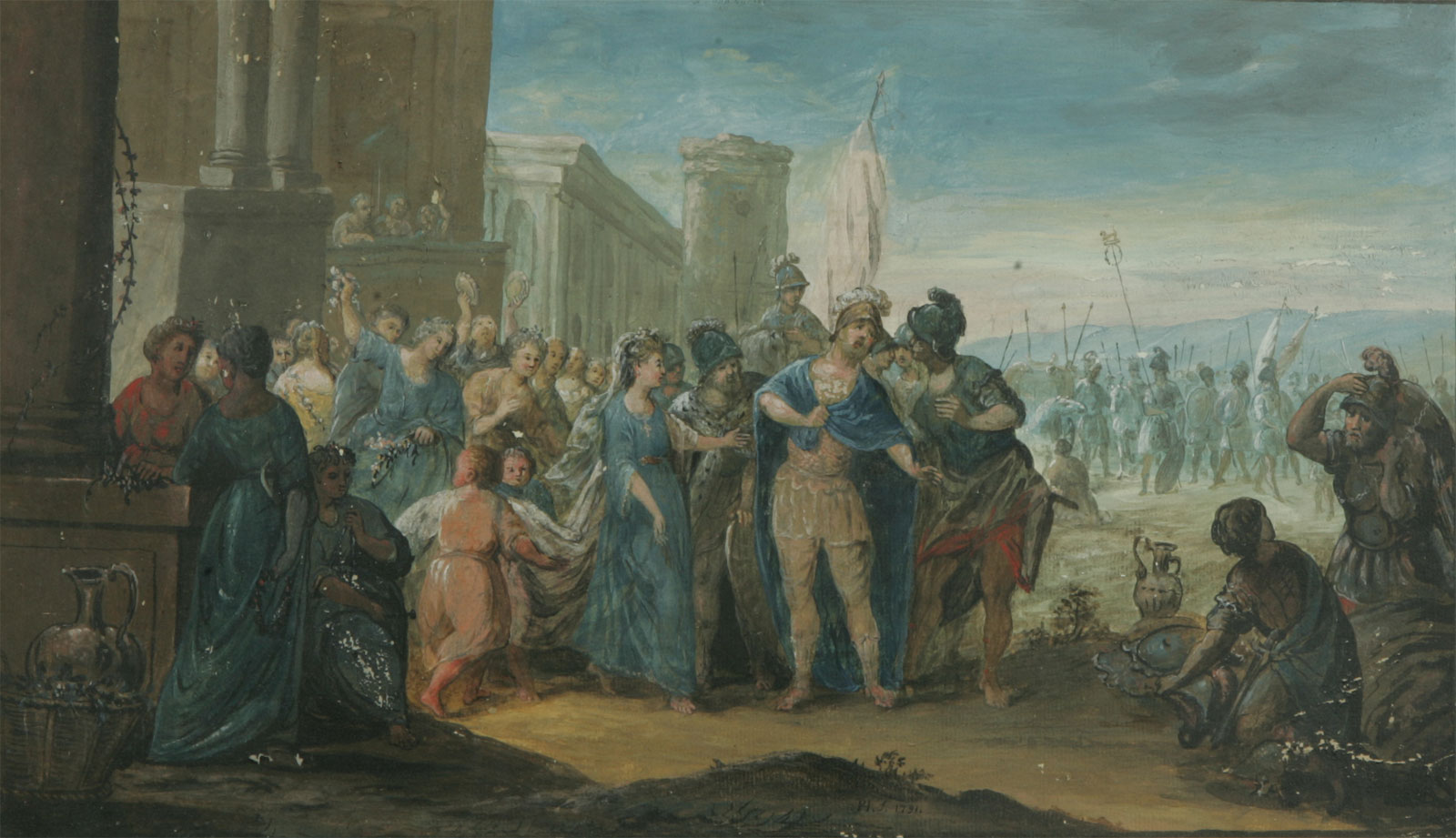
Roman soldiers with war trophy (1791), gouache by Pehr Hörberg.

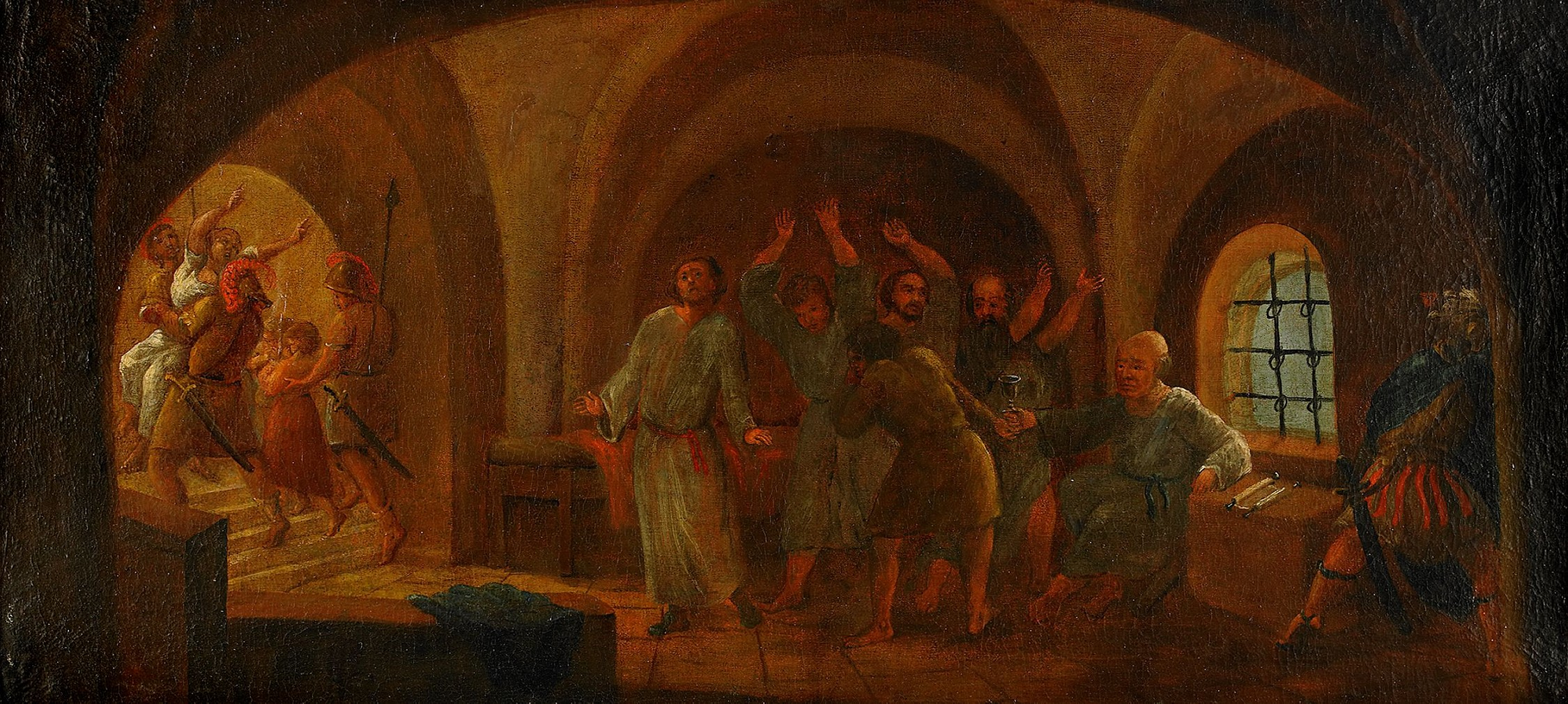
Sokrates with his poison cup in prison (1810), oil painting by Pehr Hörberg.

Pehr Hörberg (January 31, 1746, in Virestad parish in Småland, Sweden – January 24, 1816, in Risinge in Östergötland, Sweden) was a Swedish artist, painter and musician. In 1769 he married the maid Maria Eriksdotter and they had three sons.

== Biography ==
Pehr Hörberg's birthplace Virestad is a small town and a village in Älmhult Municipality in Kronoberg County, in Småland, Sweden. It was formerly the central area of the old Virestad parish. The church in Virestad was built of stone 1799–1800 on the site of a former medieval church. Some of its treasures include a pulpit from the 1600s and an altarpiece by Pehr Hörberg. He died in Falla in Hällestad Bergslag, where he owned 1/4 of the homestead, and part of the village Olstorp, in Risinge parish, where he also owned 1/4 of the homestead. Both the fourth in Falla in Hällestad and the fourth in Olstorp in Risinge were mining districts estates, located in Finspång Municipality in Östergötland County. Hörberg got his "huts in an aiding position", so to his own satisfaction that he 25 years later wrote about Olstorp and the farm in Falla, that he had later acquired, that the estates were very important for him.

=== Early tasks, education, marriage and family ===
Pehr Hörberg grew up in a poverty-sticken soldier crofter's holding Övra Ön and began to craft- and tapestry artist in Småland. Then he started as a professional painter in the rural areas in the Swedish countryside and then he became a county painter in Småland.

He early showed a passion for painting. His works, which he brought forth with primitive colors and materials, caused a sensation and wonder in the district. After a few summers as a shepherd boy, he was apprenticed to a decorative painter in Växjö. He completed his apprentice training and served as crafts- and church painter in the area of Sävsjö and Eksjö.

In 1769 he married the maid Maria Eriksdotter and together they had three sons. The family lived in poverty in a cottage, but later the family had access to crofting. In 1783 a long-awaited dream for him came true. He came to Stockholm and studied for three periods during the years 1783–1787 at the Royal Swedish Academy of Arts in Stockholm.

=== Study at the Royal Swedish Academy of Arts in Stockholm ===
Finally, at the age of 37 years, he got the opportunity to study at the Royal Swedish Academy of Arts (Konstakademien) in Stockholm, on and off, between the years 1783–1786 for the famous Swedish painter Carl Gustaf Pilo (1711–1793), a Swedish-born artist and painter. Carl Gustaf Pilo was named Director of the Swedish Academy in 1777, but first took office in 1780 when he also received an apartment in Stockholm as part of his directorship at the Academy. Carl Gustaf Pilo lived out his days at the academy, both engaged in the academy's business and in painting his masterpiece, the painting of The Coronation of Gustaf III in Storkyrkan, Stockholm which he worked on until the very end of his life.

He copied paintings from old masters for the purposes of studying the paintings and the antique plaster sculptures which made a deep impression on him, such as the statue of Laocoön and His Sons (50 B.C.) (Swedish: Laokoongruppen), at that time it was in the Royal Swedish Academy of Arts in Stockholm, and Rembrandt's The Conspiracy of Claudius Civilis or Bataverna's allegiance (Swedish: Batavernas trohetsed (1662)). Rembrandt's oil painting The Conspiracy of Claudius Civilis has been in the ownership of the Royal Swedish Academy of Arts since 1798 and it has been deposited in the Nationalmuseum in Stockholm since 1864.

So, when Pehr Hörberg studied these works of art, the statue Laocoön and His Sons and Rembrandt's oil painting The Conspiracy of Claudius Civilis, he could see them in his own art school, the Royal Swedish Academy of Arts, (Konstakademien) in Stockholm, where he studied between the years 1783–1786.

The story about the ancient statue Laocoön and His Sons at Royal Swedish Academy of Arts in Stockholm.

The story about Rembrandt's oil painting The Conspiracy of Claudius Civilis in Nationalmuseum in Stockholm.

Hörberg also got permission to study the collection of paintings in Drottningholm and took part of some of the Swedish nobleman, portrait painter and royal court painter Ehrenstrahl's works at the Storkyrkan in Stockholm, Sankt Nikolai kyrka (Church of St. Nicholas), in Gamla stan in Stockholm. But already during the time in Växjö Hörberg had seen the graphic works of Raphael (Raffaello Sanzio da Urbino, 1483–1520), the Italian master painter and architect in High Renaissance, and Wierix renaissance works with its multiple figurative scenes in classicism surroundings. The Wierix family (or "Wierix" and other variants) were a Flemish dynasty of printmakers in engraving printmakers in the 16th and early 17th centuries, active in Antwerp and Brussels.

A painting, which he admired particularly strong and often returned to, was the altarpiece in Växjö Cathedral with the motif The Ordain of the Communion, painted in 1733 by the Swedish painter Georg Engelhard Schröder.

=== Purchase of the new homestead in Östergötland ===
In 1788, Pehr Hörberg purchased a homestead in Olstorp in Risinge near Finspång in Östergötland. That was a real estate business that must have brought attention among the peasants in Rising and especially in Olstorp was made up in 1788. Then the crofter son from Småland, "The Royal Court Painter", Pehr Hörberg, bought a fourth part mantal by Chamberlain Jean-Jacques De Geer (1737–1809), a Swedish baron and upper-class chamberlain family De Geer.

In March 1790, Pehr Hörberg moved to Rising in Östergötland, where he had bought his new homestead Olstorp in Östergötland. Chamberlain Jean-Jacques De Geer af Finspång (1737–1809), at Finspång castle, gave him commissioned works in quantity and he also got assignments for the church. He dedicated himself quickly knowledge and appropriated rococo art soft colors and Carl Gustaf Pilo's chiaroscuro, and impressions especially from Rembrandt.

During his time in Olstorp, Pehr Hörberg painted most of his altarpieces. And when he portrayed "Jesus' Sermon on the Mount" in Risinge Church's altarpiece a piece of Olstorp's nature formed the framework. Just where "riksväg 51" is today in a slight downhill slope approaching the parish border with Hällestad, there is, north of the road, a small rocky knoll. "There the Master is sitting!" At least this is what many people believe. The dwelling-house on "Hörbergsgården" (Hörberg farm) has been rebuilt several times. The entrance door was moved, the roof was raised and so on. Today's house probably looks quite different from when Pehr Hörberg built it.

=== Commission for painting altarpieces ===
He was commissioned to paint altarpieces for a large number of churches in several parishes, especially from the parishes in Småland and Östergötland. Consequently, he got orders for painting the altarpieces.

=== The altarpiece in Årstad Church ===
Sometimes he carried the altarpieces in huge format. The large format of the altarpiece in the Årstad Church, Falkenberg, is over 42 sqm. Årstad parish is a locality situated in Falkenberg Municipality in Halland County. Årstad's oldest church was built in the Romanesque style during the 1200s. It was about 35 feet long and 12 meters wide. The height of the vault was over 7 feet. It was demolished and replaced by a new church in 1890. The thoughts of building a new church had been there already in 1849 and in 1869, but no breakthrough was until 1883, whereupon the planning started. The new church was designed by the Swedish architect and professor Claes Grundström (1844–1925).

=== Some famous altarpieces ===
Some famous altarpieces, most of them in Östergötland and Södermanland, out of his 87 altarpieces are:

- Algutsboda Church
- Årstad Church
- Asarum Church in Karlshamn
- Björsäter Church
- Foss Church
- Gryt Church
- Gustaf Church
- Hedvig Church in Norrköping
- Husby Oppunda Church
- Hycklinge Church
- Hölö Church
- Häradshammar Church
- Konungsund Church
- Kvarsebo Church in 1810–1813
- Kvillinge Church
- Norra Ljunga Church
- Loshult Church (the painting is stolen)
- Lunda Church in Södermanlands county
- Östra HusbyChurch
- Östra Skrukeby Church in Linköping diocese and
- Rappestad Church
- Risinge Church, Risinge old Church (Sankta Maria Church),
- Regna Church
- Rystad Church in Linköping diocese
- Skeda Church
- Skrukeby Church
- Stigtomta Church
- Stora Malm Church
- Svenarum Church
- Svennevad Church in Strängnäs diocese
- Svärta Church
- Sund Church
- Söndrum Church
- St. Olai Church in Norrköping,
- St. Lars Church in Linköping
- Tingstad Church
- Tåby Church in Linköping
- Tjällmo Church
- Vapnö Church
- Vårdsberg Church
- Västerlösa Church
- Virestad Church
- Vissefjärda Church
- Vrigstad Church

Moreover, Hörberg also painted in the Templet in Åtvidaberg in 1809. Baron Erik Göran Adelswärd (1751–1810) was a Swedish baron, military, landlord and politician, who constructed the "Templet" at Bysjön in Åtvidaberg. The prototype was a round temple in the park at Versailles. The painted ceilings, which is an allegory about the mining industry in Åtvidaberg, is made by Pehr Hörberg. The romantic temple is one of many buildings that are part of the gardens around Adelsnäs, which was in possession of Adelswärd. Another is "Solkanonen". Today the temple is an oasis at the beach Bysjön. Pehr Hörberg also painted the ceiling in Åtvidaberg Church in 1809.

=== The first Swedish arts incipient romantic ===
The year before his death, in 1815, Pehr Hörberg painted his 87th altarpiece, which also was his last. He takes up the Geatish motif (Swedish: Götiska Förbundet) and he is the first Swedish arts incipient romantic. The 87 altarpieces he painted were mainly in Linköping diocese. He was a godly man and he spent a lot of feeling in his altar paintings. He was honest as clear water. He also painted easel paintings with religious, mythological and historical subjects and still life and moreover he made engravings, woodcuts and tapestries. The drawings often reveal his lack of education, but the compositions are often grand and lively, the colors are highly impressive and the atmosphere, especially in his religious motives, are heartfelt. Hörberg's altarpieces associates with a previous tradition of chiaroscuro paintings with elements of baroque lighting effects and a classicism environment.

Pehr Hörbergs väg, a way in Södra Ängby in Bromma in Stockholm, is named after the artist Pehr Hörberg. In Södra Ängby there are seventeen ways named after Swedish artists.

Pehr Hörberg wrote an autobiography in 1787. The book by Pehr Hörberg was called: "Min lefwernes beskrifvning" (The description of my life). The book was written in 1791 with additional text in 1815 and it was published in 1968 by Risinge Hembygdsförening and Östgöta konstförening, with introductions by Bengt Cnattingius. In 1796 Pehr Hörberg became a member of the Royal Swedish Academy of Arts and royal court painter. He was a popular and respected artist.

== Holdings ==
Hörberg's portraits are held in the following locations:

- 17 paintings at Nationalmuseum (or National Museum of Fine Arts) in Stockholm, Sweden, including the painting Småländsk bondstuga (Småland farmhouse, Interior of a peasant's cottage) and a drawing after Rembrandt's The Conspiracy of Claudius Civilis, Nationalmuseum NMH 74/1919.
- around 15 paintings at the Gothenburg Museum of Art, including Petri förnekelse (Peter's denial)
- Lunds University Museum
- Smålands Museum and Växjö (Småland's museum)
- Linköpings Stadsmuseum
- Finspångs slottskyrka, altarpiece 1794
- Stockholms Frimurarorden
- Norrköpings museum, David's Orchestra

== Musicianship ==
A lesser known side of Pehr Hörberg was his career as a musician. He both wrote and made music. A number of songs for/of Pehr Hörberg has been in folk circles and still today they are fairly widespread. Among other melodies, "Pigopolska" and "Pehr Hörberg's julpolska" (Christmas polska) are his work. Pigopolskan is a reel in g-minor and it is a type of polonaise / polonesse / slängpolska or swinging reel.

Polonesse (French Polonaise, Polish Polonez) is the commonly used name of Polonaise in ¾-beat in elderly Swedish fiddler books. In the South and East of Sweden the dance usually is called slängpolska, while many other names are used on the local dance forms, such as Bingsjöpolska, Leksandslåt, Hälsingepolska, etc. When the dance was introduced in Sweden in the early 1700s it was a graceful dance in a relaxed tempo and the dance was of the accompanied by minuet, sometimes as a single dance (suite) to the same melody. During the 1700s century, the polonesse was evolved from eightbeat polonesse (not to be confused with the eight Polish) to sixteenth polonesse (commonly called the sixteenth Polish) and locally also in the faster tempo and wilder dance. In the border areas of Norway the eightbeat polonesse with triplets quickly got its own line of development.

The "Slängpolska" ("släng" Swed. for "toss, throw, chuck") is a Swedish folk dance and sometimes also the description of certain folk music tunes. The dances bearing the name slängpolska can be divided into two major types. The first type is for two or four people, and is one of the sixteenth-note versions of the polska. The second type of slängpolska is more related to other polskas than to the above slängpolska type, in that the couples move counterclockwise around the periphery of the room, and choose to do so with or without rotation clockwise around an internal axis, one full rotation for each measure. The music of Sweden shares the tradition of Nordic folk dance music with its neighbouring countries, including polka, schottische, waltz, polska and mazurka. The accordion, clarinet, fiddle and nyckelharpa (keyed fiddle) are among the most common Swedish folk instruments. This instrumental genre is the biggest one in Swedish traditional music. A nyckelharpa (literally "key harp", plural nyckelharpor or sometimes keyed fiddle) is a traditional Swedish musical instrument. It is a string instrument or chordophone. Its keys are attached to tangents which, when a key is depressed, serve as frets to change the pitch of the string. The nyckelharpa is similar in appearance to a fiddle or the bowed Byzantine lira but is more closely related to the hurdy-gurdy, both employing key-actuated tangents to change the pitch.

The polonaise is a slow dance of Polish origin, in 3/4 time. Its name is French for "Polish". The polonaise had a rhythm quite close to that of the Swedish semiquaver or sixteenth-note polska, and the two dances have a common origin.

The polska is a family of music and dance forms shared by the Nordic countries: called polsk in Denmark, polska in Sweden and Finland and by several names in Norway in different regions and/or for different variants – including pols, rundom, springleik, and springar. The polska is almost always seen as a partner dance in 3/4-beat, although variants in 2/4 time and for two or more couples exist. As suggested by the name, the roots of the polska are often traced back to the influence of the Polish court throughout the northern countries during the early 17th century. (Polska also means Polish in Swedish, though the pronunciation may be different: "Polish" is pronounced Paul-ska by some speakers and Poll-ska by others, while the dance is always pronounced Poll-ska.) In Sweden, the polska music tradition is continuous, with tunes and styles passed down through families, relatives and neighbors.

Sheet of music, notes, to the reel has been found on the backside of an altarpiece of Pehr Hörberg. The title of the notes reads "Pigopolskan – den ägta". There are two records, discs, with the Pigopolskan, one of them is Bengt Löfberg's "Luringen" and the other is Sågskäras "Krook", the latter has been transposed to a-minor. The reel is a folk dance type as well as the accompanying dance tune type. In Scottish country dancing, the reel is one of the four traditional dances, the others being the jig, the strathspey and the waltz, and is also the name of a dance figure. In Irish dance, a reel is any dance danced to music in reel time (see below). In Irish stepdance, the reel is danced in soft shoes and is one of the first dances taught to students. There is also a treble reel, danced in hard shoes to reel music.

== Sources ==
- Pehr Hörberg in Konstnärslexikonett Amanda
- Pehr Hörberg och modernismen (Swedish), pdf-file, 4 A4-pages. Published in Konstvetaren 2008 by Konsthistoriska klubben in Linköping. Author: Sune Axelsson.
- Pehr Hörberg in Nordisk Familjebok, volume 12, 1910, page 273
- Pehr Hörberg in Nordisk Familjebok, volume 12, 1910, pages 274–275
- Pehr Hörberg in Nordisk Familjebok, volume 12, 1910, page 276. Picture of the altarpiece in Östra Husby kyrka, Vikbolandet, Östergötland, by Pehr Hörberg. The motif is "Kristi himmelsfärd" ("The Ascension of Christ").
- Pehr Hörberg (Swedish). Author: Carl Thelander.
- Ansedel Pehr Hörberg in DISGEN

== Other links ==
Media related to Pehr Hörberg at Wikimedia Commons

- Art Signature Dictionary, genuine signature by the artist Pehr Hörberg Here are three examples of Pehr Hörberg's signature, from 1779, 1787 and 1805.
- Antiqvarisk tidskrift för Sverige, andra delen (1867–1869), page 103f, about Östra Husby Church.
- Panorama from the inside of Östra Husby church. Virtual tour. Fine panorama views from the inside of Östra Husby church with the altarpiece "The Ascension of Christ" by Pehr Hörberg.
- Panorama from the inside of Häradshammar church. Virtual tour. Fine panorama views from the inside of Häradshammar church with an altarpiece by Pehr Hörberg.
- Interior from Åtvid's big church A high and tall church really takes a central position. The church is built in 1884 in English Gothic style and with a typical triptych altarpiece. To the right of the altar there is an oil painting by Pehr Hörberg hanging.
