= Nicolai Eigtved =

Danish architect

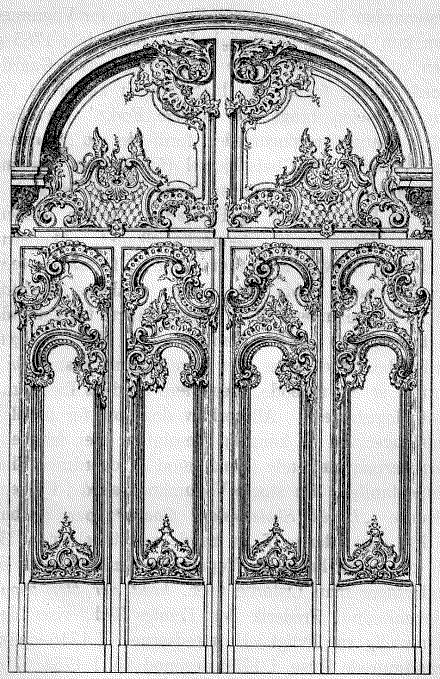
Eigtved's drawing for the main portal door at Christiansborg Palace, carved by Louis August le Clerc

Nicolai Eigtved (4 June 1701 – 7 June 1754), also known as Niels Eigtved, was a Danish architect. He introduced and was the leading proponent of the French rococo or late baroque style in Danish architecture during the 1730s–1740s. He designed and built some of the most prominent buildings of his time, a number of which still stand to this day. He also played an important role in the establishment of the Royal Danish Academy of Art (Det Kongelige Danske Kunstakademi), and was its first native-born leader.

== Youth and early training ==
He was born Niels Madsen on the farm in the village of Egtved in the parish of Haraldsted on the island of Zealand, Denmark to Mads Nielsen and Dorthe Hansdatter. He was trained locally as a gardener, and was promoted to a position at the Frederiksberg Palace Gardens ca. 1720. In July 1723 he got an opportunity to travel out of the country as a royal gardening apprentice. He travelled to Berlin and Dresden, among other places in Germany, earned his keep with jobs as a gardener, and learned to speak German.

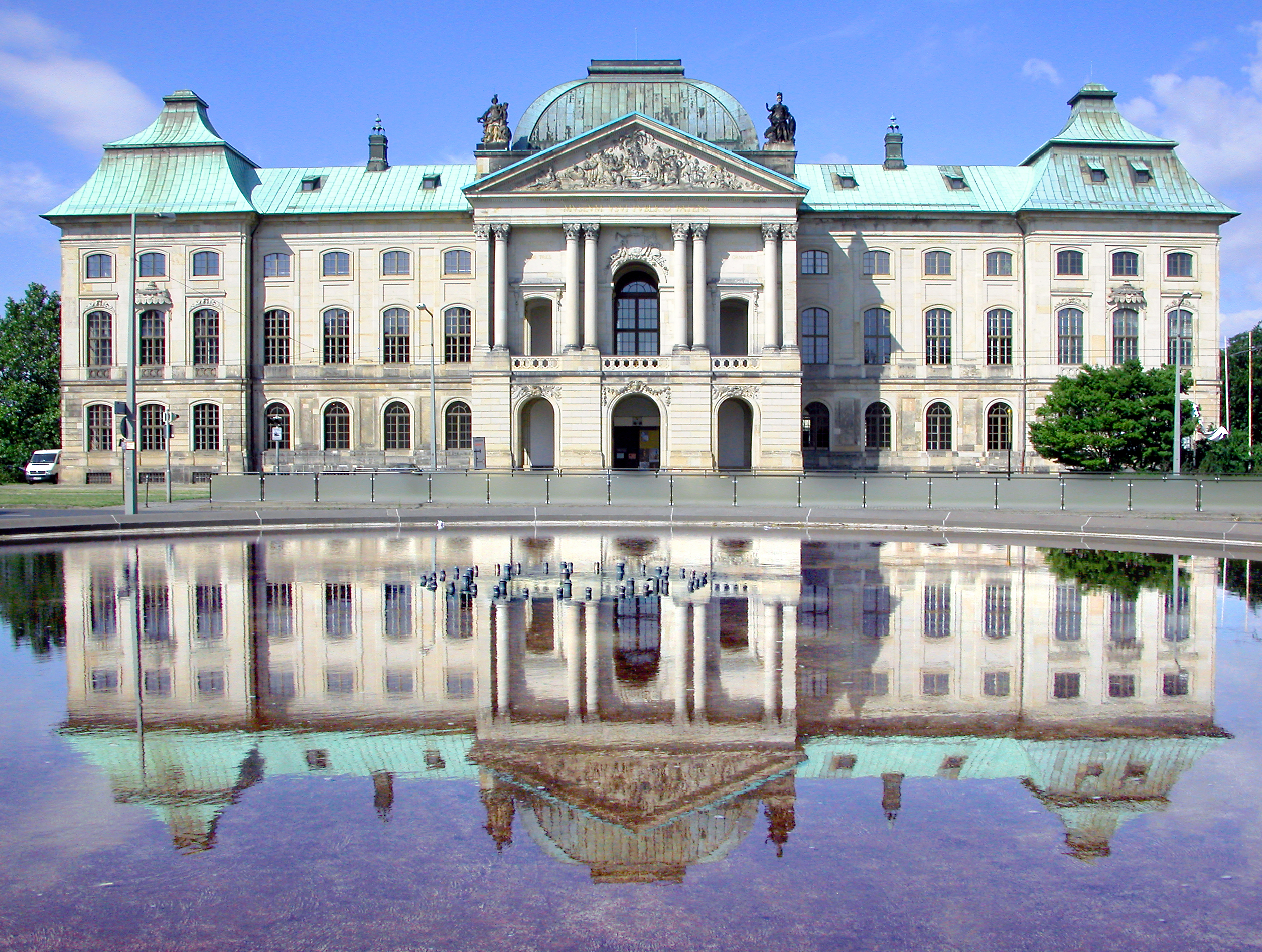
Japanisches Palais in Dresden

== Years in Poland ==
From 1725 he lived in Warsaw, Polish-Lithuanian Commonwealth, where he came to the attention of German architect and draughtsman Colonel Matthäus Daniel Pöppelmann, for whom he worked for several years. Pöppelmann was connected to the Saxon-Polish court under Frederick Augustus I, and got him a position as second lieutenant in the Saxon-Polish Engineer Corps.

Eigtved came into a rich architectural environment, which was influenced by the presence of French immigrants including Jean de Bodt and Zacharias Longuelune. Some of Pöppelmann's assignments in those years, on which Eigtved would have probably participated, were Augustus Bridge (Augustusbruecke) in Dresden (1728), the extension of the Japanese Palace (Japanisches Palais) in Dresden (1727), drafts for the three-king church in Dresden new city (1723–1739), and a new large lock for the Saxon dynasty (c. 1730).

In 1730 Eigtved was promoted to lieutenant in Engineer Corps, and participated in the building of the ruler's military camp near Zeithain. He made excellent military drawings, and became acquainted with Danish statesman General Poul Vendelbo Løvenørn, who after his return to Denmark interested King Christian VI in Eigtved. The King summoned Eigtved to Denmark, and with the title of captain he was dismissed from foreign service.

== In service to Denmark ==
He was made Danish lieutenant in 1732, and Christian VI let Eigtved further educate himself in Italy between 1732 and 1735 in civil architecture. On his travel back to Denmark, he stayed and made drawings in Vienna and Munich, where he became familiar with the rococo style seen in the design of French architect François de Cuvilliés for the newly built Amalienburg Palace near Nymphenburg Eigtved returned to Denmark in 1735 after twelve years' absence. Building construction was at a fever pitch, with construction of Christiansborg Palace having been begun three years earlier. He was named captain in the Engineer Corps, and named royal building master with supervisory responsibility for Jutland and Funen in 1735.

== Royal building master ==
Thus began a lifelong rivalry with colleague Lauritz de Thurah, another royal building master and the leading proponent of baroque architecture at the time. Eigtved became the king's preferred architect, and Eigtved's rococo style was the preferred building style. As a result, de Thurah was often overlooked, while Eigtved got the best assignments.

He participated along with German architect Elias David Hausser and Lauritz de Thurah in the interior construction of Christiansborg Palace, with wood sculpting by Louis August le Clerc. Eigtved and de Thurah, for the most part, divided up the interior assignments. Eigtved designed the king's apartments, the main staircase, the chapel's interior, the riding grounds, and the Marble Bridge (Marmorbroen) and its two pavilions, and gave the castle its delicate Louis XIV style. Most of Eigtved's accomplishments at Christiansborg were lost in the fire of 1794.

Hausser, who had been the original architect for the project, lost his influence as the younger de Thurah and Eigtved took on larger assignments in the castle project. In 1738 the king set up a royal buildings commission that would lead the continued work on the castle. The commission would be led by State Minister Count Johan Sigismund Schulin (1694–1750). At the same time Eigtved and de Thurah switched areas of responsibilities, where de Thurah gave up Copenhagen and the island of Zealand, in exchange for Eigtved's Jutland Peninsula.

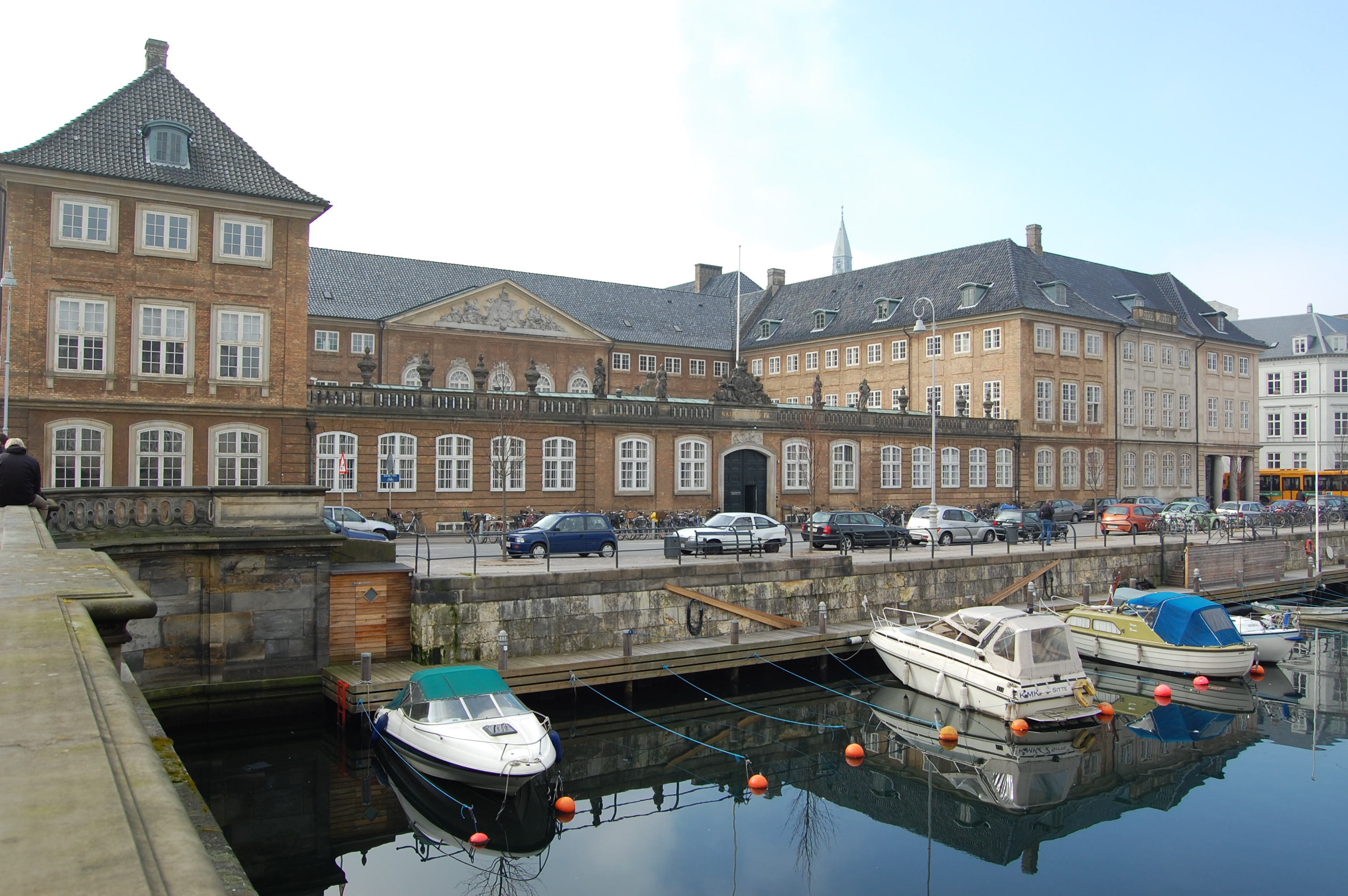
Prince's mansion at Frederiksholm's Canal

In 1742 Eigtved was promoted to lieutenant colonel in the Engineer Corps, became a member of the Building Commission, and took over the role of leading architect for Christiansborg Palace from Hausser. Eigtved designed and built, along with Boye Junge, The Prince's mansion at Frederiksholm's Canal (Frederiksholms Kanal) 1743–1744, for the Crown Prince Frederik V. The building is now the National Museum (Nationalmuseet). At the same time, he also designed a mansion for Schulin of the Building Commission in Frederiksdal.

Between 1744 and 1745, Eigtved built a small pavilion for Privy Councillor J.S. Schulin on the Furesø Lake called Frederiksdal Pavilion. Credited with being the earlier example of "maison de plaisance" in Denmark, "it jointly had large and small rooms symmetrically ordered around the main axis' vestibule and constervatory. The mansard roof is the result of an alteration carried out by Johann Gottfried Rosenberg in 1752–1753, who while working on Frederiksdal also designed Margård Manor on Funen, also inspired by French country estates."

== Foundation for the Royal Danish Academy of Art ==
Around this same time he came in contact with the Drawing and Painting Academy (Tegne – og Malerakademiet), predecessor to the Royal Danish Academy of Art (Det Kongelige Danske Kunstakademi). Until then the Academy has had an impoverished existence with weak leadership. Eigtved overtook administrative responsibility for the Academy in 1745 after the departure of Hieronimo Miani as leader from Denmark.

The Marble Bridge at Christiansborg was completed in 1744. He was named Church Inspector for Copenhagen, Kronborg, Antborskov, Vordingborg and Tryggevælde district in 1745.

In 1746 Frederik V ascended to the throne, and along with him came the powerful statesman and leader Court Marshal (Hofmarshal) Adam Gottlob Moltke, who became Eigtved's proponent in the court.

On 28 December 1747 he made a proposal to create a stronger foundation for the Academy, which was approved by the King on 12 February 1748. In this way Eigtved took control of the Academy as its first strong administrator, and the first Dane in a leading position. In late summer 1748 the Academy moved to the floor above the Crown Prince's stables at Christiansborg Palace, where Eigtved also had his official offices.

== Copenhagen district: Frederiksstad ==
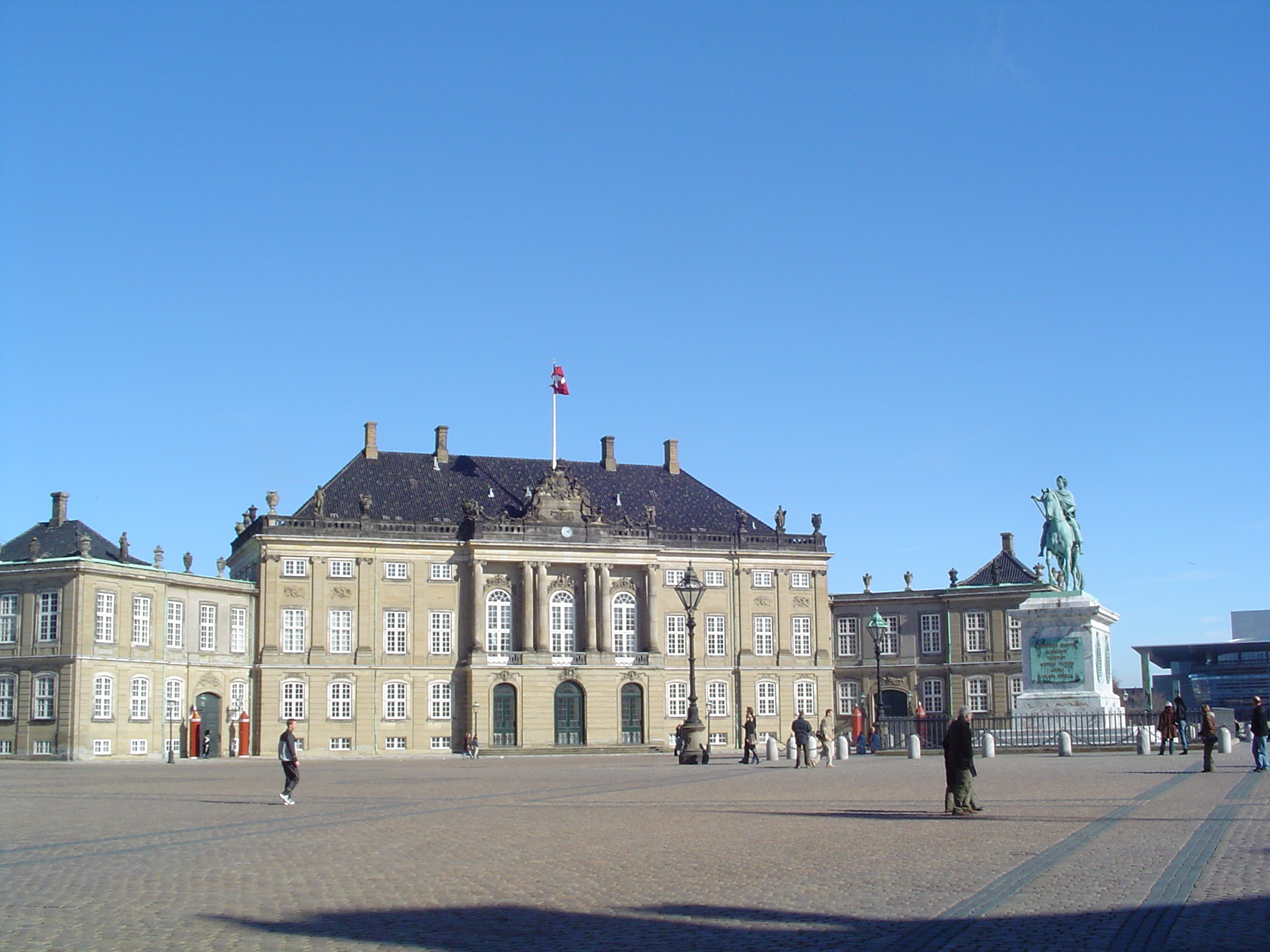
Christian IX's Palace at Amalienborg

In 1748 it was 300 years since the Oldenburg family took the throne in Denmark, and in 1749 the 300-year jubilee of the coronation of Christian I of Denmark was commemorated with the establishment of a new district in Copenhagen called Frederiksstad. Heading the project was Moltke, and Eigtved was architect. The new Frederiksstaden district was built on the former grounds of Amalien Garden (Amalienhave), and became a fine example of European rococo architecture.

At the center of the district lay the four palaces at Amalienborg, including the Moltke Palace, today known as Christian VII's Palace, surrounding the octagonal Amalienborg Plaza. In the middle of the plaza, Moltke's Danish Asia Company erected a monumental equestrian statue of Frederick VI designed by Jacques François Joseph Saly. The four palaces surrounding the plaza were identical from the outside, but different on the inside. Moltke's Palace was the most expensive, and had the most extravagant interiors. Its Great Hall (Riddersalen) is acknowledged widely as perhaps the finest Danish rococo interior.

Eigtved also designed and built in the Frederikstaden district Frederiks Hospital, now the Danish Museum of Applied Arts ( Kunstindustrimuseet). Eigtved also led building work on one of the masterpieces of Frederiksstad — the centrally located Frederik's Church (Frederikskirke), now commonly referred to as now known as The Marble Church (Marmorkirken).

Moltke, who was also director for the Danish Asiatic Company, had Eigtved design a warehouse for the company on Christianshavn. The building called Eigtved's Pakhus was built 1748–1750. During this same period of time Eigtved also worked on the expansion of Moltke's estate Bregentved, which had been given to him by the King after his ascension to the throne. He was promoted to colonel in the Engineer Corps in 1749.

== Change of direction and Eigtved's fall ==
Eigtved became the Art Academy's first director in 1751. However Eigtved's rococo style, which had been popular for so long, was about to suffer with the absolutist King's change of interest. On 30 March 1754, on the King's thirtieth birthday, the Academy moved to Charlottenborg, and became dedicated as the Royal Danish Academy of Art, after inspiration from France's Académie française. Eigtved was snubbed at the Academy of Art's opening ceremony when professor and royal portraitist Carl Gustaf Pilo gave the welcoming speech to King Frederick V, not Eigtved. Eigtved was removed from the Director's position a few days later, and the directorship went to Frenchman sculptor Jacques Saly. Also on the same day that the Academy was moved to Charlottenborg, the Eigtved-designed Moltke Palace was officially dedicated by the king.

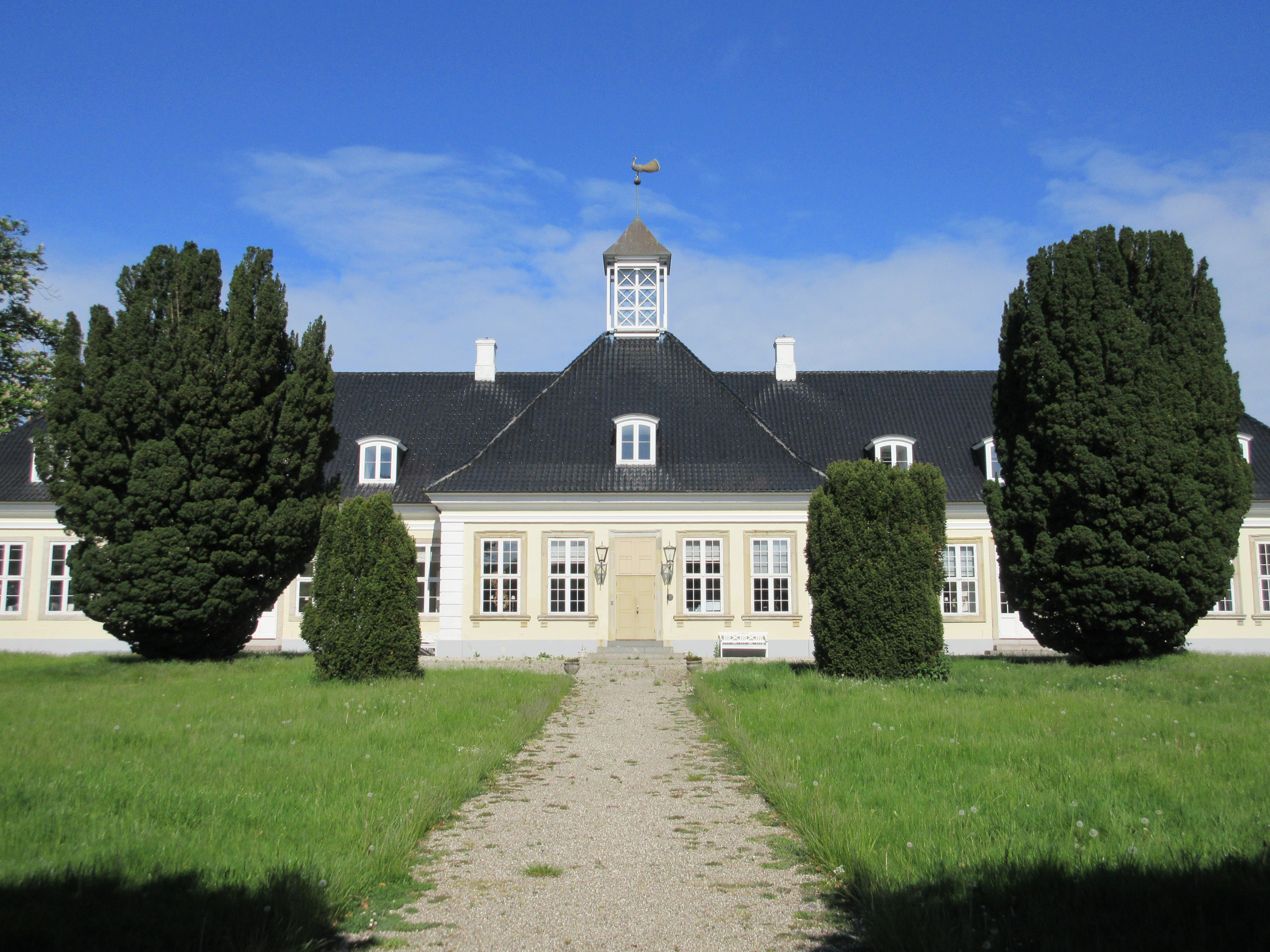
Sophienberg in Hørsholm

At his death two of the four Amalienborg Palaces were complete, the two western palaces. The work that he had begun was continued by de Thurah strictly according to Eigtved's plans. The palaces were finally completed in 1760. de Thurah tried unsuccessfully to get project leadership of the work on Frederick's Church, but was denied that role, which went instead to Nicolas-Henri Jardin on 1 April 1756.

He stands along with Laurids de Thurah as the leading architect of his time. His death probably saved him from the same type of long, agonizing downfall, as de Thurah had suffered, when his rococo style gave way to the King's newly preferred neoclassicism and his newly preferred architect, Nicolas-Henri Jarden. Eigtved also built Sophienberg in Rungsted, the old Royal Danish Teatre, and in 1753 helped extend Fredensborg Palace by adding four symmetrically positioned corner pavilions with separate copper pyramid-shaped roofs to the main building.

== Personal life ==
On 24 May 1743, he married Sophie Christine Walther (1726–1795), chambermaid to Princess Louise, at Frederickborg Castle Chapel. They had seven children, but only three lived to adulthood. His daughter Anne Margrethe Eigtved was married to architect Georg David Anthon (1714–1781).

Eigtved died on 7 June 1754 in Copenhagen. He and members of his family were buried at St. Peter's Church, Copenhagen.

== Other sources ==
- Knud Voss; Nicolai Eigtved (1971) Arkitekten Nicolai Eigtved, 1701-1754 (Copenhagen: Nyt Nordisk Forlag) ISBN 978-8717014657
