= Johan Edvard Mandelberg =

Swedish painter

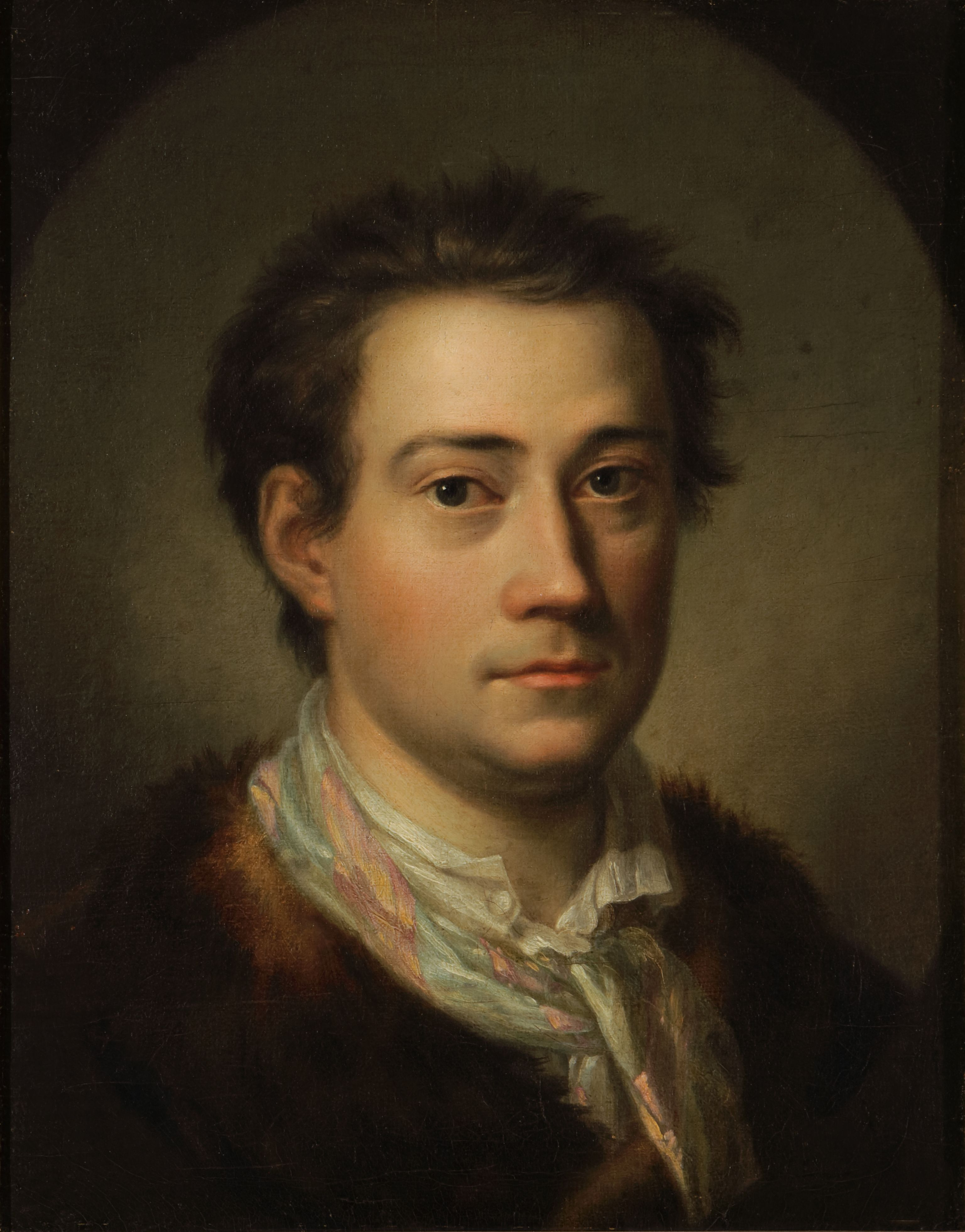
- Johan Mandelberg painted by Peder Als in 1758
- Born: Johan Edvard Mandelberg; 22 January 1730; Livland, Sweden
- Died: 8 January 1786 (aged 55); Copenhagen, Denmark
- Education: Royal Danish Academy of Art (Det Kongelige Danske Kunstakademi)
- Known for: Painting
- Spouse: Anna Margaretha Meyer
- Parent(s): Johan Edvard Mandelberg (father) and Hedvig Sophia (mother)

Johan Edvard Mandelberg (22 January 1730 – 8 January 1786), Swedish-born painter living in Denmark, was born at sea during a voyage between Stockholm and Livland, Sweden.

== Life ==
=== Mandelberg seeks training ===
He was born to painter Johan Edvard Mandelberg and mother Hedvig née Sophia. His father taught him to draw and paint, and he worked in his father’s workshop in Stockholm. On seeing a battle picture by Johan Philip Lembke at Drottningholm Palace, Johan became determined also to paint battle scenes. Since there was no possibility in Sweden for him to get the necessary training for his ambitions, he received financial backing from three supporters who sent him to Paris in 1752. He went to Paris by way of Copenhagen along with Norwegian-born medallionist Magnus Gustavus Arbien (1716–1760). It was in Copenhagen that he became acquainted with Carl Gustaf Pilo (1712/1713?-1793), professor at the Drawing and Painting Academy, predecessor to the Royal Danish Academy of Art (Det Kongelige Danske Kunstakademi).

=== He comes to Paris ===
He came to Paris with good recommendations and came into the leading French art circles where he caught the attention and interest of Count Philippe de Caylus, renowned artist François Boucher, and fellow Swede Alexander Roslin (1718–1798).

He found work at François Boucher’s atelier in 1753. He was impoverished, and made small battle pictures in pen and ink, as well as copies of paintings to supplement his meager earnings.

Arbien helped Mandelburg secure financial support by contacting Pilo in Copenhagen, who then interested the Danish Legation secretary to the French Court in Paris Justitsråd Joachim Wasserschlebe, foreign minister Count Johan Hartvig Ernst Bernstorff and Adam Gottlob Moltke, and finally through them King Frederick V of Denmark. The King's support was generous, but conditional—Mandelburg would need to commit himself to Denmark and his Court.

=== Subsequent training in Rome ===
After his three-year studies in Paris he went on to Rome, where from late 1755 he came into the antique art enthusiast circle around Danish Johannes Wiedewelt, Italian Pompeo Batoni and German Anton Raphael Mengs. Wiedewelt would become a lifelong friend.

He painted several battle scenes in Rome, among which were paintings made for Wiedewelt, and for Court Marshall Bülow.

On July 1, 1758, he traveled back to Denmark in the company of Wiedelwelt. They traveled over Caprarola, Siena, Florence, Pisa, Carrara, Lucca, Bologna, Padua, Venice, and Trieste where they studied the local art collections and churches, and on through the Tyrol and Germany. They arrived back to Copenhagen on October 6, 1758.

=== Career in Copenhagen ===
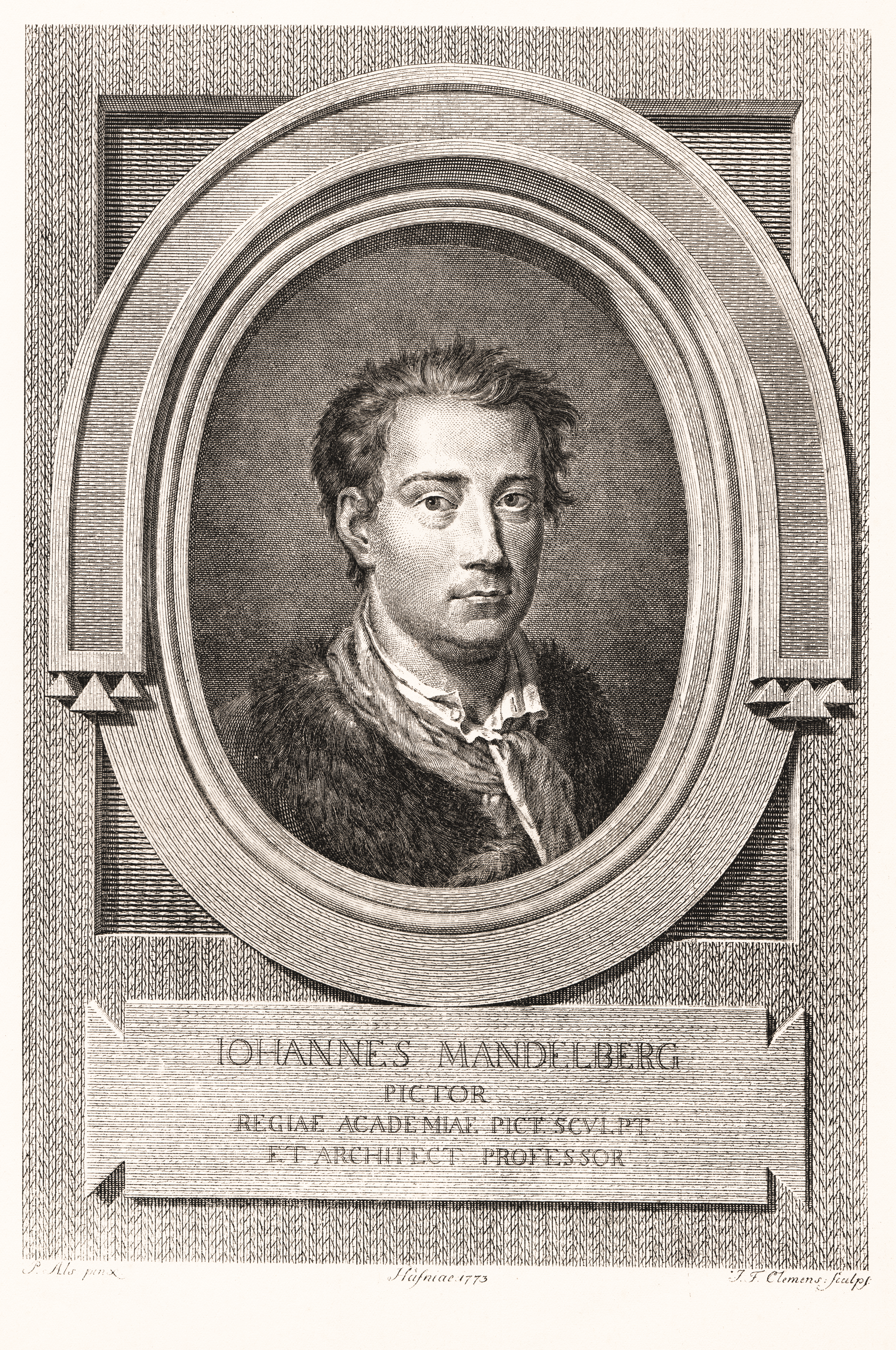
Johan Mandelberg. Engraving by Johan Frederik Clemens.

Only 4 years after its opening in 1754, he was accepted as a member of the Royal Danish Academy of Art (Det Kongelige Danske Kunstakademi). When sculptor Johan Christof Petzold died in 1763, Mandelberg was granted his vacated professorship.

He married Anna Margaretha Meyer on May 26, 1781. She died May 5, 1823.

He had plenty of work, but unfortunately there came no assignments for him in his specialty area of battle painting; but he would have to be named historical and battle painter for the royal court in order to win these projects. He was mostly employed painting mythological paintings, depictions of courtly life, and decorations paintings. Among these were many large pictures and decorations for the royal palaces. He was so busy that he had to use extra help from competent students at the Academy such as Nikolaj Abraham Abildgaard, with whom he would again work together on decorations to the Knights' Room at Christiansborg Palace.

He died on January 8, 1786, in Copenhagen.

== See also ==
- List of Danish painters
