= Louis August le Clerc =

French sculptor (1688–1771)

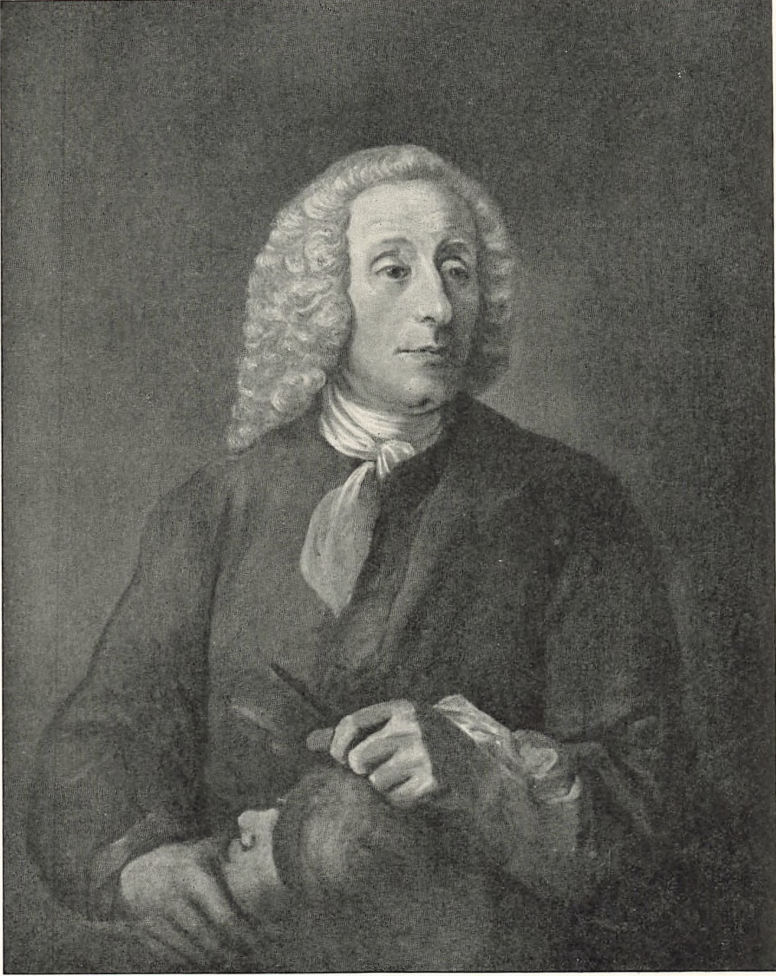
Louis August le Clerc.

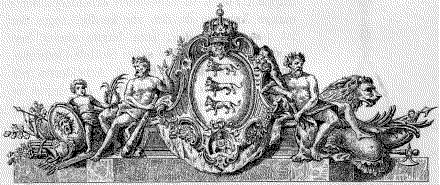
Le Clerc's drawing for the frontispiece at Christiansborg Palace

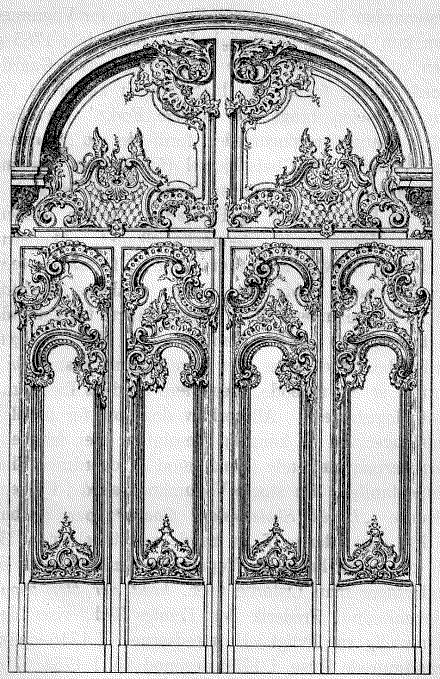
Nicolai Eigtved's drawing for the main portal door at Christiansborg Palace, carved by Le Clerc

Louis August le Clerc (1688 – 8 March 1771), also known as Louis-Augustin le Clerc, was a French-born sculptor working in Denmark. He was born in Metz, France to copperplate engraver Sebastian le Clerc and his wife Charlotte van den Kerckhove. He was summoned to Denmark at the age of 47, and lived out the rest of his life there as a royal sculptor to the Danish Court and as professor at the Royal Danish Academy of Art. He helped introduce French Rococo artistic ideals to Denmark.

== Life ==
=== Training and student travels ===
He studied at the French Academy of Art, the Académie royale de peinture et de sculpture under sculptor Charles-Antoine Coysevox. There he won two prizes for his work.

=== Early career ===
He traveled to Ansbach in Bavaria and Brühl near Cologne in 1734–1735.

In Ansbach he worked for the Margrave Carl Wilhelm Friderich.

In Brühl he worked for Cologne's Archbishop and German Empire Prince Elector Clemens August von Wittelsbach. Here he assisted Bavarian Court master builder, architect François de Cuvilliés 1734-1735 on the Elector's hunting lodge Falkenlust (also known as Schloss Falkenlust), on the grounds of Augustusburg (also known as Schloss Augustusburg). These buildings are now considered the most important buildings of the late Baroque and Rococo in all of the Rhineland. They were declared a World Heritage Site in 1984 by UNESCO.

Figure groups in wall niches in the upper vestibule sculpted by le Clerc are still extant.

=== Summons to Denmark ===
He was summoned to Denmark in the summer of 1735 by King Christian VI to help with the interior decoration of Christiansborg Palace. He arrived that same year along with his wife, Caroline Wilhelmine Isabella, and was named royal sculptor to the Danish Court in December of that same year.

He was, along with Elias David Häusser and Nicolai Eigtved, one of the primary figures involved in the creation of Christiansborg. He was named head of the sculpture and stone work at the palace in 1737. Most of the work he did at Christiansborg, however, was eventually lost, having been destroyed in the fire of 1794.

Existing still to this day are wood carved vases in Christiansborg's horse stalls, and relief medallions on the side of the Marble Bridge (Marmorbro) that leads to the castle's main entrance. Four perspective drawings he made of Christiansborg 1746–1747 are in the collection of the Engraving Museum in Copenhagen.

Destroyed work from the castle includes the cornices, capitals and frames of the windows; carved wall panels, fireplaces and console tables in both the king's and the queen's suites; the golden dining room with buffet and chandelier; sculptures on the balustrade, and all sculpture work in the castle church.

In 1739 he created a fountain in the King's Garden (Kongens Have) at Rosenborg Castle representing a boy with a swan. The sandstone original was replaced by a bronze figure featuring a similar motif; the replacement was designed and produced by Hermann Ernst Freund in 1837.

=== Leadership in the early days of the Academy ===
After Hendrick Krock's death in 1738 le Clerc, along with the Venetian history painter Hieronimo Miani, took over the leadership of the burgeoning Royal Danish Academy of Art, then known as the Drawing and Painting Academy (Tegne- og Malerakademiet). He served as leader of the Academy 1740–1748.

His first wife died on 22 January 1741. He married his second wife Jacobine Louise Lefèvre a year later, on 30 January 1742.

=== Winds of change at the Academy ===
He continued alone in the role of Academy director after Miani left Denmark in 1745, and until architect Nicolai Eigtved took full control over the Academy. In 1746 Frederik V, the successor king to Christian VI, came to the throne. As the king was an absolute king, and the Academy's protector, changes in government could, and often did, mean major changes to organizations dependent on royalty's good graces. While le Clerc had been greatly favoured by King Christian VI, who appreciated his artistic abilities, Frederik V favoured other artists.

Frederik V affirmed his support for the Academy by issuing a royal resolution on 12 February 1748. In addition to a financial commitment there were specified organizational changes. At the same time le Clerc was named professor to the Academy, one of the first artists to be so named.

Frederik V established the current Academy of Art (now called Det kongelige skildre-, billedhugger- og bygningsakademi, in English "The Royal Painting, Sculpture and Architecture Academy") in 1754. He was made a member of the Academy that same year, and also named professor. Le Clerc did not play a significant role in the new Academy, other than as a teacher. After Frederik V had summoned another French-born sculptor Jacques Saly to Denmark in 1752 to create a monumental equestrian statue of himself for the courtyard of Amalienborg Palace, le Clerc's importance went down and his production became small.

He continued as professor at the Academy until his death. His artistic skills were not employed much in his later years. He died in Copenhagen, in his house on Brolæggerstræde, on 8 March 1771. He was buried in the Reformed Cemetery in Copenhagen.

== Aftermath ==
Most of his work has been lost to the ravages of time, especially due to the disastrous fire at Christiansborg. In addition to the few extant pieces previously noted, there is still work of le Clerc’s in the Knight’s Hall (Riddersalen) in Moltkes Palace, one of the four buildings at the Amalienborg Palace complex.

But even before the great fire destroyed so much of his work, the tides had shifted against him. Rococo, as an artistic ideal, had been discredited, and Frederik V, the successor king to le Clerc’s great patron, chose to favour other artists.

In addition, some drawing of his work are still in existence.

His portrait of Carl Gustaf Pilo is in the keepsake of the Academy.
