= Johannes Wiedewelt =

Danish sculptor

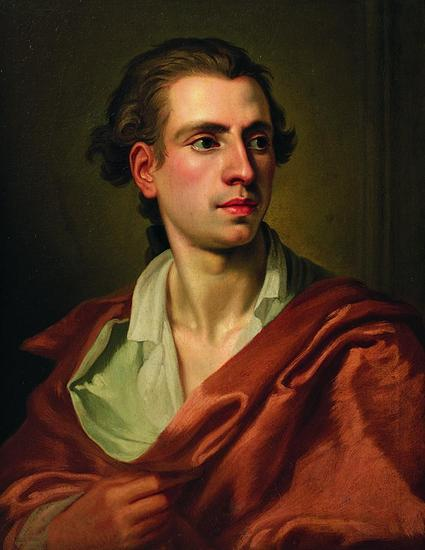
Johannes Wiedewelt as painted by Peder Als in 1766.

Johannes Wiedewelt (1 July 1731 – 17 December 1802), Danish neoclassical sculptor. He became a court sculptor, introducing neoclassical ideals to Denmark in the form of palace decorations, garden sculptures artifacts and, especially, memorial monuments. He was undoubtedly the best known Danish sculptor before Bertel Thorvaldsen.

== Life ==
=== Early training ===
He was born in Copenhagen to royal sculptor to the Danish Court, Just Wiedewelt (1677–1757) and his wife Birgitte Lauridsdatter. The elder Wiedewelt recognised his son's talents early, and the boy trained under the Italian history painter Hieronimo Miani, one of the two leaders of the Drawing and Painting Academy (Tegne- og Malerakademiet) in Copenhagen along with Louis August le Clerc (1688–1771), as early as perhaps 1744. This academy was the precursor to the still-extant Royal Danish Academy of Art (Det Kongelige Danske Kunstakademi) established ten years later.

When Miani left Denmark in 1745 to return to Italy, the elder Wiedewelt took a stronger hand in training the boy, apprenticing him in his workshop. At the same time the young Wiedeweldt continued at the academy, drawing under Johan Christof Petzoldt (1708-1762) and he presumedly also trained under royal sculptor to the Danish Court, Didrick Gercken (169-1748). He began already to produce his own works early, and had produced in Spring 1750 two small busts cast in tin of King Frederik V and Queen Louise. He was paid a reasonable sum for this work, and it encouraged him to follow his dream to study outside of Denmark.

=== Student travel to Paris ===
Several months later at nineteen years of age he ventured out on a student travel that took him over Hamburg to Rouen and finally to Paris in August 1750. There he met the Danish Legation secretary to the French Court in Paris Joachim Wasserschlebe (1709-1787) who would become a patron of the young sculptor. With Wasserschlebe's help, Wiedewelt was taken into the studio of the renowned Baroque sculptor Guillaume Coustou the Younger, where from 1750 to 1754 he worked partially as a student and partially as an assistant. He later received a yearly royal allowance from King Frederik, which was doubled after two years.

In Paris he also came to know Jean-Baptiste Pigalle. During 1752–1754, Wiedewelt made a sculpture of fellow-Dane, Magnus Gustav Arbien (1716–1760), medallionist who was at the time studying under a royal stipend from the Danish Court. Wiedewelt won a silver medallion from the French Academy of Art (Académie Royale de Peinture et de Sculpture) in 1753.

There was a sweeping artistic interest during those times for the study of ancient art. This rage originated in the discoveries of Herculaneum in 1738 and Pompeii in 1748, and was fanned by the directorship of the French Academy, Marquis de Marigny Abel-François Poisson(1727–1781), brother of royal mistressMadame de Pompadour (1721–1764). Poisson introduced the technique of drawing from antiquities, especially architecture, sculpture and landscapes, instead of from models. This technique was based on his experiences in Italy visiting the recently excavated archeological sites.

=== Continued travel to Rome ===
Wiedewelt was the first to receive a travel stipend from the newly established Danish Academy of Art in 1754 and used the funds to travel to Italy. Although Coustou tried to convince Wiedewelt to stay in Paris longer, the young sculptor left for Rome in May 1754. His trip took him over Lyon, Marseille and Civitavecchia; he arrived in Rome on 7 June 1754.

A letter of recommendation from Wasserschlebe introduced Wiedewelt to the Director of the French Academy in Rome (l´Academie de France á Rome), Charles-Joseph Natoire (1700-1777). He lived and studied at the academy, lodging at the Palazzo Mancini. Natoire put him in contact with others in residence there. Among these were German painter Anton Raphael Mengs, Italian Pompeo Batoni, and German archeologist and art theorist Johann Joachim Winckelmann who arrived in Rome 1755. At the academy he, along with other students, came under the influence of Giovanni Battista Piranesi, who had lived in Rome since 1740 and who set a heightened focus on antiquities as artistic subject matter.

Wiedewelt visited private collections such as the Farnese collection, as well as the publicly accessible ones such as the Capitoline Museums and the Vatican Museum. He and Johann Winckelmann studied ancient sculptures together, and Winckelmann advised the younger Wiedewelt, encouraging him to use these sculptures as a base for his drawings and to use his knowledge of ancient art as the basis for his artistic production. Wiedewelt made many drawings and sketches of these ancient sculptures during his Roman residence. The two were inseparable. Wiedewelt's friendship and admiration for Winckelmann left a deep impression on him, especially in regards his acquired knowledge and appreciation for Ancient Greek artifacts and art. During his time in Rome he also managed to take excursions to Naples, Pompeii, Herculaneum and Portici. Several of these trips were made in the company of Winckelmann in 1758. The two would remain close, maintaining a lively letter exchange, until Winckelmann was murdered in Trieste in 1768.

=== Return to Denmark and an artistic career ===
Wiedewelt left Rome on 1 July 1758, when his financial support was running out, and after he had been ordered home to Denmark by the academy. He traveled back in the company of friend, neoclassical painter Johan Edvard Mandelberg. They traveled over Caprarola, Siena, Florence, Pisa, Carrara, Lucca, Bologna, Padua, Venice, and Trieste where they studied the local art collections and churches, and on through the Tyrol and Germany. They arrived back to Copenhagen on 6 October 1758.

Hardly six months after his return Wiedewelt was named member of the newly organised Art Academy, as well as being named royal sculptor to the Danish Court in 1759, inclusive gratis studio at Materialgaarden near Frederiksholm's Canal. He was known for his good taste in art and his knowledge of antiquities. He became quickly the judge of artistic good taste in Denmark.

Commissions soon followed. As a first commission he was requested to sculpt a memorial monument to the long deceased king Christian VI of Denmark by his widowed wife, Sophie Magdalene. The marble monument was completed in 1768, but was not installed at Roskilde Cathedral until 1777. The neoclassical monument included a sarcophagus and two female figures, Sorgenand Berømmelsen. This was the first neoclassical sarcophagus in Denmark, and is considered to be neoclassicism's start in Denmark.

In 1760 he began work on another comprehensive project, sculptural groups, individual sculptures and decorations for the gardens at the French-inspired baroque Fredensborg Palace. He produced a large series of drawings for the King giving his suggestions for the decoration of the gardens. He came to work closely with architect Nicolas-Henri Jardin, with whom he would travel together to London and Paris in the late 1760s. His outdoor sculptures here and at other gardens have come to comprise the greatest assembled collections of his works.

In 1761 he became a professor at the Art Academy. He also took on a leading position with Fourniers Porcelain Factory 1761–1766. Wiedewelt wrote a small manifesto in 1762 entitledTanker om Smagen udi Kunsterne i Almindelighed.

He contributed to the decoration of Frederiks Church, also known as the Marble Church (Marmorkirken) with no less than 64 figures and 30 reliefs. Due to the scale of the royal projects, the time constraints and the common practices of the time Wiedewelt often left the direct work of sculpting be carried out by his studio assistants from sketches, which he delivered.

In 1765-1766 he delivered a plaster allegorical relief and twelve medallions of the Oldenborg kings to the sumptuous Knights Hall (Riddersalen) at Christiansborg Palace, plus additional decorative pieces. These were all lost in the fire of 1794. Some of the medallions are evidenced in engravings.

He served as Treasurer of the Academy 1767–1772, and served as Director of the same 1772–1778, 1780–1789, and 1793–1795. He exhibited at the Salon for the first time in 1769, and subsequently in 1778 and 1794.

In 1769 he completed the monument to Frederik V in Roskilde Cathedral which includes a large sarcophagus resting on footpieces and decorated by numerous sculptures, behind which is a column topped of an urn, a medallion with the king's portrait, and on each side of the sarcophagus, sitting approx. 9' high above the floor, are two crowned, grieving female figures representing Denmark and Norway. The memorial chapel was created as a collaboration between Wiedewelt and architect Caspar Frederik Harsdorff.

=== Later career ===
In 1768-1769 Wiedewelt traveled to Paris and London in the company of architect Nicolas-Henri Jardin, then architect for Frederik's Church, now known as the Marble Church (Marmorkirken). His travel journals show that he visited famous gardens during the trip, and studied them carefully.

Large commissions from the court slowed down drastically after this foreign tour, as Johann Friedrich Struensee's took over control of the country from the weak, young, schizophrenic, newly crowned King Christian VII and put his cost-cutting reforms into place between 1769 and 1771. These cutbacks also resulted in Jardin's losing his position with the Church after this same two-year travel. German-born Struensee was widely disliked, and between 1770 and 1772 Wiedewelt created a series of drawings satirizing Struensee and his associate Count Enevold Brandt. He also designed several coins for Christian VII in 1771.

Starting in the early 1770s, the reaction to Struensee led to a wider distrust of foreigners in positions of power in Denmark. This included the foreign-born artists, especially French artists, in the King's service who lost power and influence in Denmark's official artistic and Academic circles. Friend Jardin resigned his professorship at the Academy on 26 March 1771.

From this point on, although Wiedewelt remained court sculptor until his death, his commissions came primarily from private patrons, and were mostly grave monuments and sarcophaguses. He received many such commissions, and during a thirty-year period he produced over 36 such works. Among these are one for Ludvig Holberg in Sorø made in 1779, and another for the first wife of Adam Gottlob Moltke, statesman and high official at the Danish Court.

The only large order he received from the court after that time was one for Høegh-Guldbergs National Historical Garden (Høegh-Guldbergs nationalhistoriske anlæg) named for Ove Høegh-Guldberg, theologian and historian. The commission consisted of fifty-four monuments to be set up on the expansive grounds of Crown Prince Frederik V's Jægerspris Castle in Jægerspris. They were sculpted between 1777 and 1789. Wiedewelt was inspired by Ove Malling's book Store og gode Handlinger af Danske, Norske og Holstenere published in 1777. He decorated the park with monuments and memorial stones in honour of exceptional Danes, Norwegians, and Holsteiners, placing these pieces in the open parkland. He took advantage of his recent studies of foreign gardens, especially the English garden Stowe Park near Buckingham which he had visited, and created a new visual language.

Additionally his studio produced reliefs in 1773 of Hercules and Omphale for the Hercules Pavilion in the King's Garden (Kongens Have), the gardens of Rosenborg Castle in Copenhagen. In 1782 he designed coin cabinets for the Royal Coin Museum (Det kongelige Møntkabinet) at the same castle.

In 1783 he created Bernstorff Column (Bernstorffstøtten), a memorial for Foreign Minister Count Johan Hartvig Ernst Bernstorff in Lyngby, who had early-on instituted agricultural reforms (landboreformer) on his estate, prior to the land-wide reforms that followed on 20 July 1788.

These land-wide reforms led to the monumental Frihedsstøtten in Copenhagen. Work was started August 31, 1792 and it was erected in 1797. It is still on public display although in a new location. The monument was 20 meters high and consisted of an obelisk of red sandstone, a pedestal of grey marble and a base on three steps of red sandstone before the renovation of 1998–1999. Wiedewelt contributed to this piece with the statue Troskaben, which is one of four sculptures in this large piece, and with the relief Retfærdighedens Genius. The other artists who contributed to the monument were Nikolaj Abraham Abildgaard, who designed the overall monument, colleague Andreas Weidenhaupt and Nicolai Dajon.

Between 1785 and 1801, Wiedewelt created fifteen monuments for the day's important people at Assistens Cemetery near Copenhagen's Northern City Gate (Danish: Nørreport). Of these eight can still be seen today in the park-like setting.

== Final Years ==
Wiedewelt was chosen eight times as Director of the Art Academy; the last time he held the position was 1793–1794. He worked hard to keep the academy running well, facing often-shifting attitudes from the court and uncertain royal financial support. He was committed to the end, in spite of ill health in his advanced age.

He also worked until the end, even though his own financial means worsened drastically, and he lived in abject poverty. During his many years of good economy he lived a festive life with no restrictions, and he was very generous. When times became rough, as it did not only for him but also for others who were accustomed to royal support, he suffered along with the royal house's financial problems. In spite of his meager economy he continued to support two elderly sisters, a servant man, as well as a poor cousin. He had never married.

By the end Wiedewelt had pawned most of his belongings, when a final catastrophe proved to be too much for him; a shipload of marble blocks he had purchased with borrowed money went to the bottom of the sea near Læsø. This apparently proved to be more than he could handle, and shortly thereafter on 17 December 1802 he drowned in an apparent suicide in Sortedamsøen, a lake just outside that day's Copenhagen limits. He was buried on Christmas Eve at Assistens Cemetery in Copenhagen. His grave monument was made by friend and colleague Andreas Weidenhaupt (1738–1805).

== Works ==
He had a rich fantasy, and his compositions were easy and natural. His works were tasteful, and influenced by both his French Baroque training and his careful study of and appreciation for late Greek and Roman art. He was well-versed in the use of classical allegory and symbols, especially those having to do with death. He was also inspired by Nordic mythology and ancient, Viking and Icelandic sagas, and made many drawings based on these. Sculptures and reliefs attributed to him and his studio have been lost to time, and are sometimes only evidenced by sketches and engravings.

His works are a part of the royal households and gardens. Those in the gardens are the largest collections of his works in one place. He viewed his garden decorations as creating an outdoors theatre presentation relating to the surrounding trees of various types, to figure groups of sculptures and to decorative columns and obelisks. He had a sense of the developing romantic garden.

His memorial monuments are spread out in churches throughout Denmark, with the royal monuments at Roskilde Cathedral. Many of these monuments can be found at Assistens Cemetery in Copenhagen.

His drawings are also highly esteemed. He illustrated a deluxe edition of Ludvig Holberg's "Peder Paars" in 1772, engravings for which were made by Johan Frederik Clemens, who collaborated with Wiedewelt on several projects. He also made illustrations for a book by Peder Topp Wandal on the Jægerspris Castle project in 1783. Clemens also engraved these illustrations,

Wiedewelt, along with architect Harsdorff, was one of the primary figures responsible for introducing Neoclassicism to Denmark. He was highly esteemed by his contemporaries and by those artists who followed. He is considered an important transitional figure leading to future generations of Danish artists.

He had a large library of books covering many subjects, which often served as a source of inspiration.

As professor at the academy he introduced his Neoclassical theories to artistic students. Among his many students was Nikolaj Abraham Abildgaard, future Director of the academy and instructor for Bertel Thorvaldsen.

== In memory of Wiedewelt ==
In 1803, Adam Gottlob Oehlenschläger, poet and playwright, wrote a well-known elegy in his honour, calling him "Denmark's Phidias".

Taus hun sukker
Bølgen mildt sig lukker
om den gamle Tindings sølvgråe Haar.
Hun forsvinder.
Dagen bleg oprinder;
Hist paa Frihedsstøtten Lærken slaaer.

Troskab græder
I de hvide Marmorklæder
Kold og bleg, den ranke hulde Mø.
Haand paa Brystet
Aldrig aldrig trøstet,
stirrer hun henpå den sorte Sø

Silently she sighs
The mild waves close in
Round the old man's temples, his silver-grey hair.
She disappears.
The pale day runs out.
Yonder on Freedom's Monument the lark sounds.

Faithfulness cries
In its white marble clothes
Cold and pale, the proud gracious maiden
Hand on breast
Never, never comforted
She stares out onto the dark lake.

== Related literature ==
- Annette Rathje & Marjatta Nielsen (eds.), Johannes Wiedewelt - A Danish Artist in Search of the Past, Shaping the Future (Museum Tusculanum Press) 2010. ISBN 978-87-635-0787-5
- Karl Wilhelm Tesdorpf, Johannes Wiedewelt: Dänemarks erster klassizistischer Bildhauer. Ein Anhänger von Winckelmann, (Hamburg: Johann Trautmann Verlag) 1933.

== Other sources ==
- KID Kunst Index Danmark ("Art Index Denmark")
- Danish Biographical Encyclopedia ("Dansk biografisk Leksikion")

Cultural offices
Preceded by Carl Gustaf Pilo	Director of the Royal Danish Academy of Fine Arts; 1772–1777	Succeeded by Caspar Frederik Harsdorff
Preceded by Caspar Frederik Harsdorff	Director of the Royal Danish Academy of Fine Arts; 1780–1789	Succeeded by Nikolaj Abraham Abildgaard
Preceded by Andreas Weidenhaupt	Director of the Royal Danish Academy of Fine Arts; 1793–1795	Succeeded by Jens Juel
