= Hendrick Krock =

Danish painter

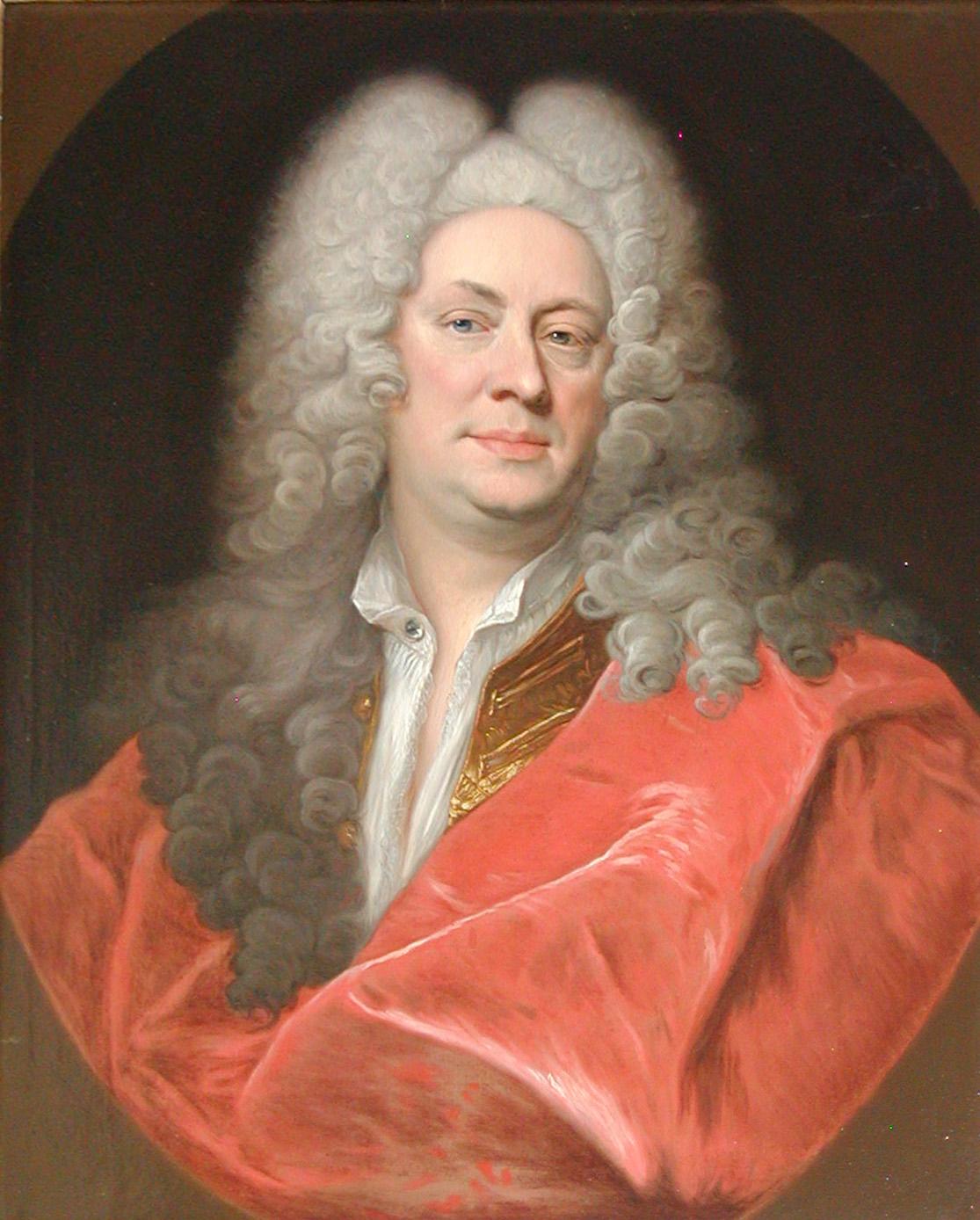
- Hendrick Krock portrayed by J.S. Wahl in the early 1700s
- Born: 21 July 1671; Flensburg
- Died: 18 November 1738 (aged 67); Copenhagen
- Known for: Painting
- Movement: Baroque

Hendrick Krock (21 July 1671 – 18 November 1738) was a Danish history painter who, from 1706, was the court painter of Frederick IV as well as his successor Christian VI. Along with Benoit Le Coffre set the tone for history painting in Denmark during the 18th century-1720s, having been influenced by the Italian baroque painting he experienced during his travels. He also played a role in the eventual establishment of an Art Academy in Denmark.

== Early training ==
He was born to merchant Valentin Krock and Volborg Peters in Flensborg. At 11 years of age he studied under Johan Ayerschöttel of Husum, a well-known portraitist of the time. He came to Copenhagen in 1688, where he taught drawing, and studied under painter to the royal court Peder Andersen at Frederiksborg Palace.

In 1693 he traveled to France, and then to Italy, where he stayed for a period of time. According to one of his later students, Krock traveled to Italy in the company of young Ulrik Christian Gyldenløve, King Frederick IV’s half-brother. He returned to Italy in 1699.

== Impetus to an Art Academy ==
In October 1701 Krock was in Copenhagen again, and on 6 October 1701 he was one of the cosigners of a petition sent to King Frederick IV requesting approval for the formation of an artist society and teaching academy. This was the humble beginning to the formation of the Royal Danish Academy of Art (Det Kongelige Danske Kunstakademi) many years later. The other cosigners were Wilchen Riboldt, Jacob Coning, Otto de Willarts, Georg Saleman and Thomas Quellinus, all court artists.

He traveled to Italy for the third time in 1703, and worked several years in the studio of Carlo Maratta, under a travel grant from the King. He may have studied at the Art Academy in Paris ca. 1705.

== Painter to the court ==
He returned to Denmark again in 1705, and painted over the remainder of his working life many plafonds, wall panels, door pieces and mythological paintings as decoration for such royal palaces and castles as Frederiksberg, Fredensborg, Hirschholm, Rosenborg, and Christiansborg, as well as for various churches. These works were generally large, and with many figures.

He was named royal painter in 1706. He married Helle Cathrine Robring in 1707.

Numerous works were lost to the fires at Christiansborg in 1794 and at Frederiksborg in 1859, including his famous "Dommedag" ("Judgement Day"). Work extant can still be seen on plafonds at Fredensborg and Frederiksberg. Due to the volume of work he produced he maintained a studio with many students and apprentices.

He made only a few portraits, and when depicting royalty or nobility he was known to be assisted by Nicolai Wichmann to complete the heads and faces.

The artist society met weekly until 1712 in the Ahlefeldt house on Kongens Nytorv in Copenhagen, where Krock taught drawing. That same year Krock received a royal studio behind Børsen (“The Stock Exchange”) in the Post Office (Postamts) building. Beside his duties as a royal painter, he used the studio to teach drawing, and also as a meeting place for the artist society which he managed and provided with educational materials.

Krock became a well-to-do man, and had an impressive home. His first wife died in 1718.

In 1722 he became an advisor to the Chancellory (Kancelliraad). He remarried on 17 November 1722 to Elisabeth Vilhelmine Magdalene Cumm, but she died a year later. He married his third wife, Armgott Sophie Koefoed, on 26 April 1724.

His position as royal painter was renewed in 1731; at that same time, however when the building of Christiansborg had begun, the preferred artistic style was quickly changing from Krock’s baroque to the new rococo-style. French painters were being called in to do the work, because there were no qualified Danish artists. And therefore, the idea of a Danish Art Academy, which could train native artists to decorate the King’s castles and palaces, became an important royal objective.

In 1731 he painted an altar piece portraying Christ on the Mount of Olives in St. Peter’s Church (Sankt Petri Kirke) in Copenhagen. The work was thoroughly restored in 1995.

His third wife died in 1733.

In the late 1730s plans were beginning to seriously take shape for a royal art academy, and the Academy received rooms in the same building as Krock's studio. In 1738 Krock was named leader of Christian VI’s Art Academy along with sculptor Louis August le Clerc. Krock, however, died shortly afterwards on 18 November 1738.

Leadership of the burgeoning Academy was taken over by le Clerc and Venetian history painter Hieronimo Miani after Krock's death.

None of his students or apprentices took over his artistic production.

There is a portrait of Krock by Johann Salomon Wahl in the collection of the Frederiksborg Castle Museum.
