= Zacharias Longuelune =

French architect

Zacharias Longuelune (1669 — 30 November 1748) was a French architect and master builder who worked in the second half of his life for the royal court of the Electorate of Saxony in Dresden. His design style was French Baroque and Classicism.

Longuelune was born in Paris. After working in Berlin and Potsdam for Frederick I of Prussia and travelling to Italy, he settled in Dresden in 1713 where he became Senior State Architect (Oberlandbaumeister) in 1731 for the Elector of Saxony, Augustus II the Strong. His works include the park at Grosssedlitz (1719–1732), the Riverside Palace and the water stairs at Pillnitz Castle (1720–1725) and part of the Japanisches Palais (from 1729 with court architect Matthäus Daniel Pöppelmann).

He died in Dresden in 1748.
