= Peder Als =

Danish painter

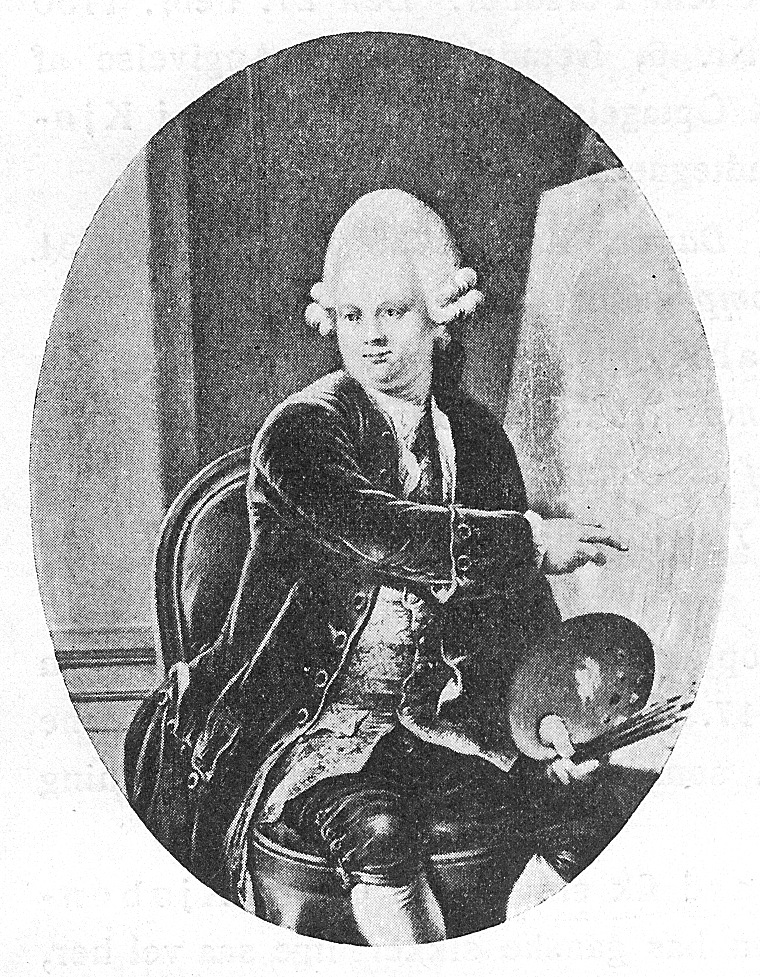
Portrait of Peder Als from "Det Danske Frimureries Historie", volume 1 by Karl Ludvig Tørrisen Bugge.

Peder Als (16 May 1725 – 8 July 1775) was a Danish historical and portrait painter.

== Life ==
Als was born at Copenhagen in 1725, and studied under Carl Gustaf Pilo whose style was a considerable influence on him. He first attracted attention in 1743, when he sold a painting of biblical subject to the King of Denmark.

He attended the Kunstakademiet (the Royal Danish Academy of Fine Arts), and while still there gained recognition as a portraitist with a series of paintings of knights of the order of the Dannebrog. He won the academy's gold medal in 1755, and travelled to Rome and Paris in 1757–62. In Rome he entered the school of Anton Raphael Mengs, who became another powerful influence on him. He spent most of his time in Rome copying the pictures of Raphael and Andrea del Sarto, which it is said that he did with great accuracy. He also copied Correggio and Titian.

On his return to Denmark he painted some good portraits; but his colouring was considered too sombre to give a pleasing effect to his pictures of women, and his work was said to be so laboured as to be deprived of all animation. He became a member of the Kunstakademiet in 1764, and professor at the Kunstakademiet in 1766. He died in 1775.

As well as painting in oils, he also worked in pastel and produced a few miniatures.

== Gallery ==
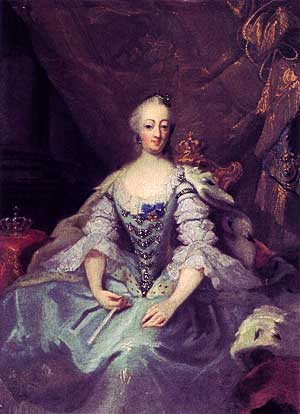
Sophia Magdalena of Denmark

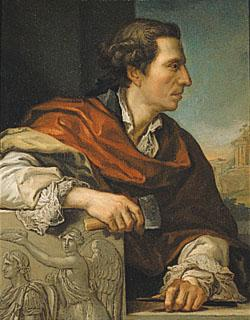
Johannes Wiedewelt, 1766

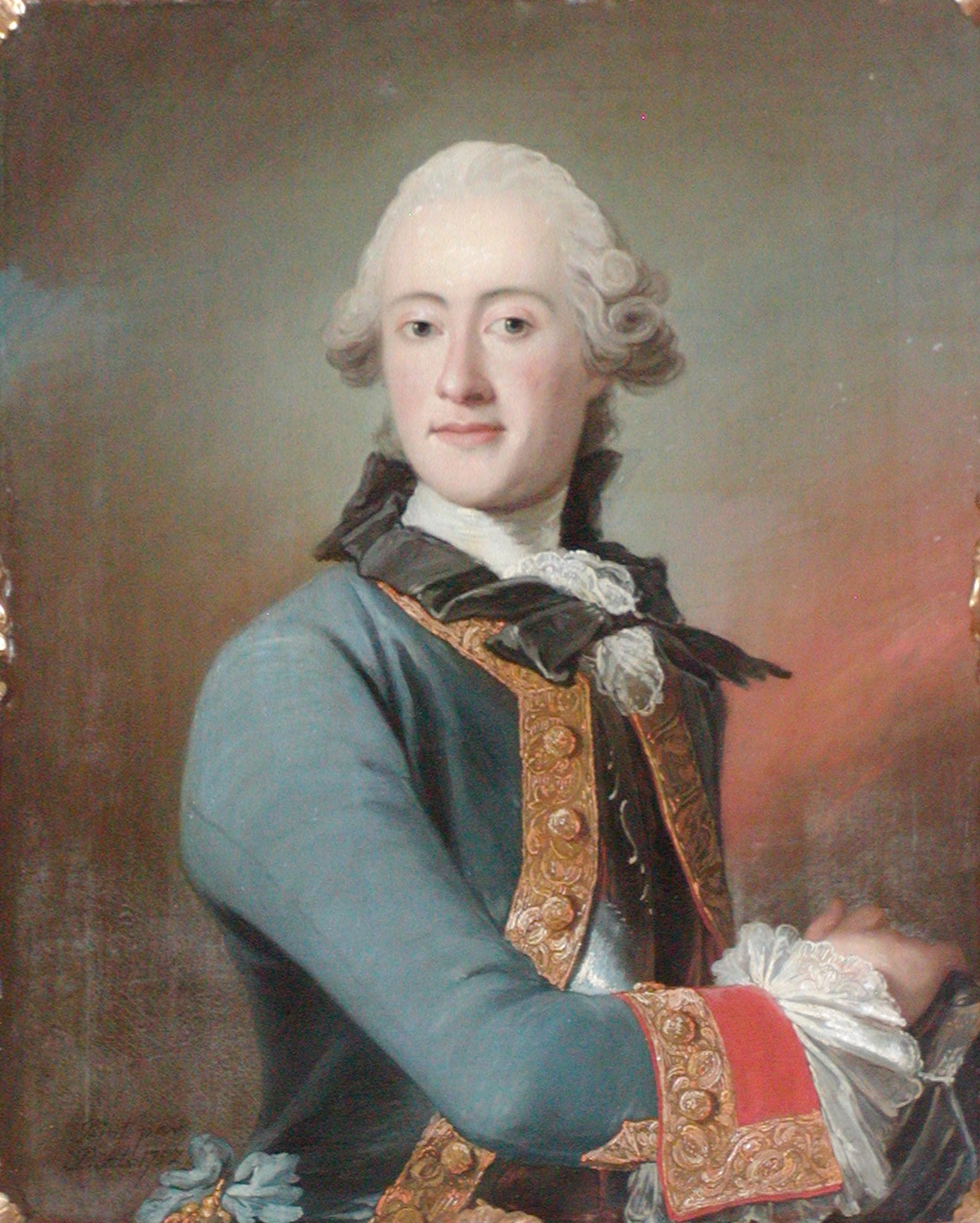
Frederik Christian Kaas

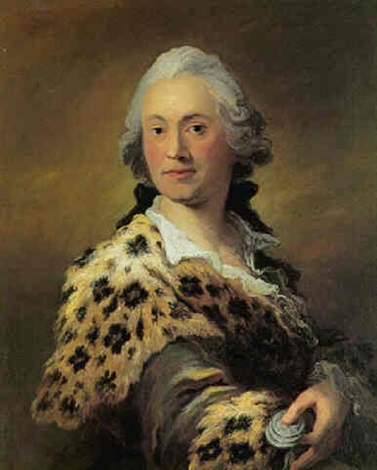
Peter Christian Winsløw
