= Olstorp =

- Location within Västra Götaland Location within Sweden
- Coordinates: 57°49′N 12°17′E
- Country: Sweden
- Province: Västergötland
- County: Västra Götaland County
- Municipality: Lerum Municipality

Area
  - Total: 1.65 km^{2} (0.64 sq mi)

Population (31 December 2010)
  - Total: 1,281
  - Density: 774/km^{2} (2,000/sq mi)
- Time zone: UTC+1 (CET)
  - Summer (DST): UTC+2 (CEST)

Olstorp is a locality situated in Lerum Municipality, Västra Götaland County, Sweden. It had 1,281 inhabitants in 2010.
