= Japanese Palace =

Baroque building in Dresden, Germany

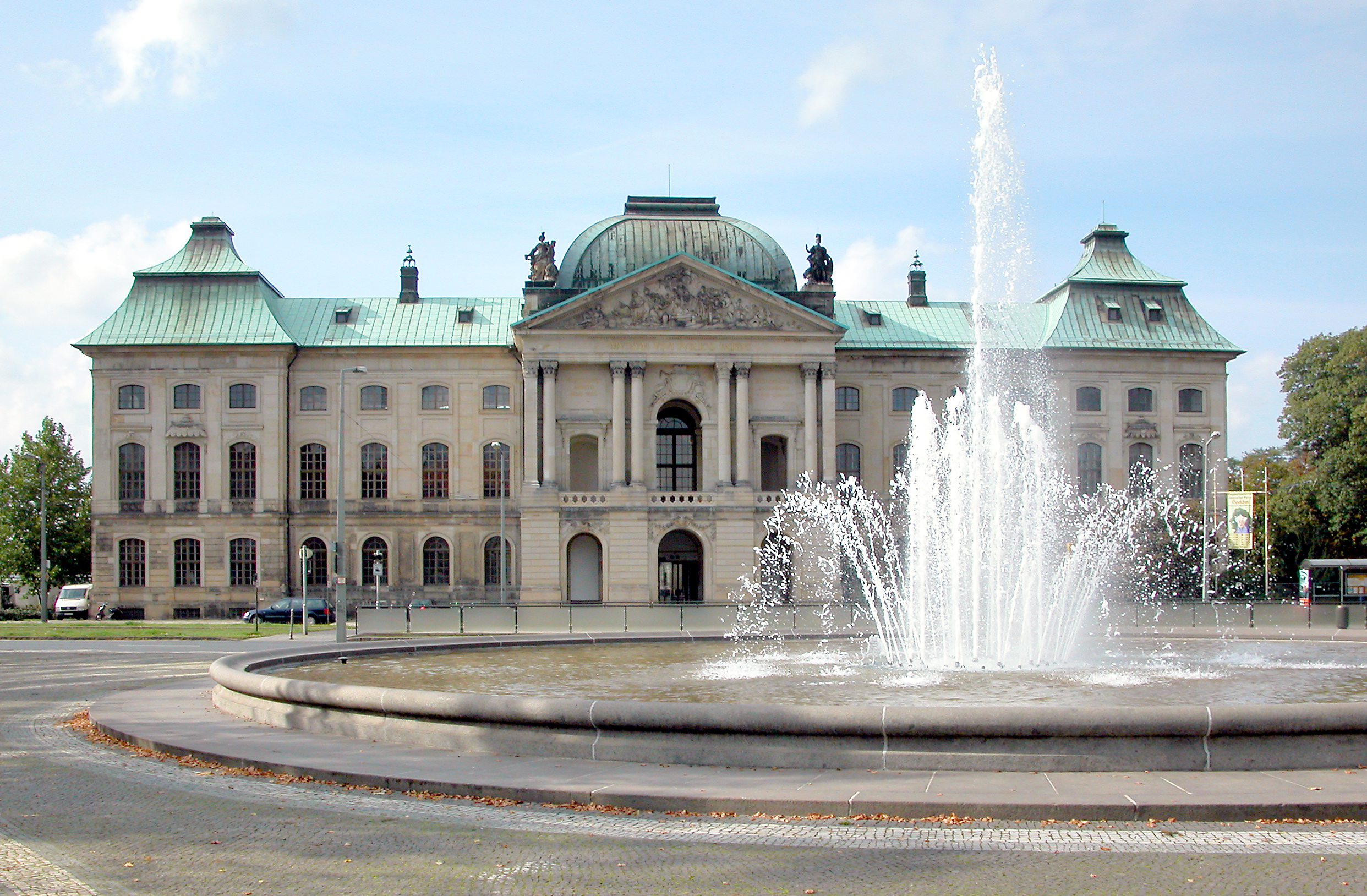

- Location within Germany

General information
- Architectural style: Baroque
- Location: Palaispl. 11, 01097 Dresden, Germany
- Coordinates: 51.060°N 13.738°E
- Year built: 1735

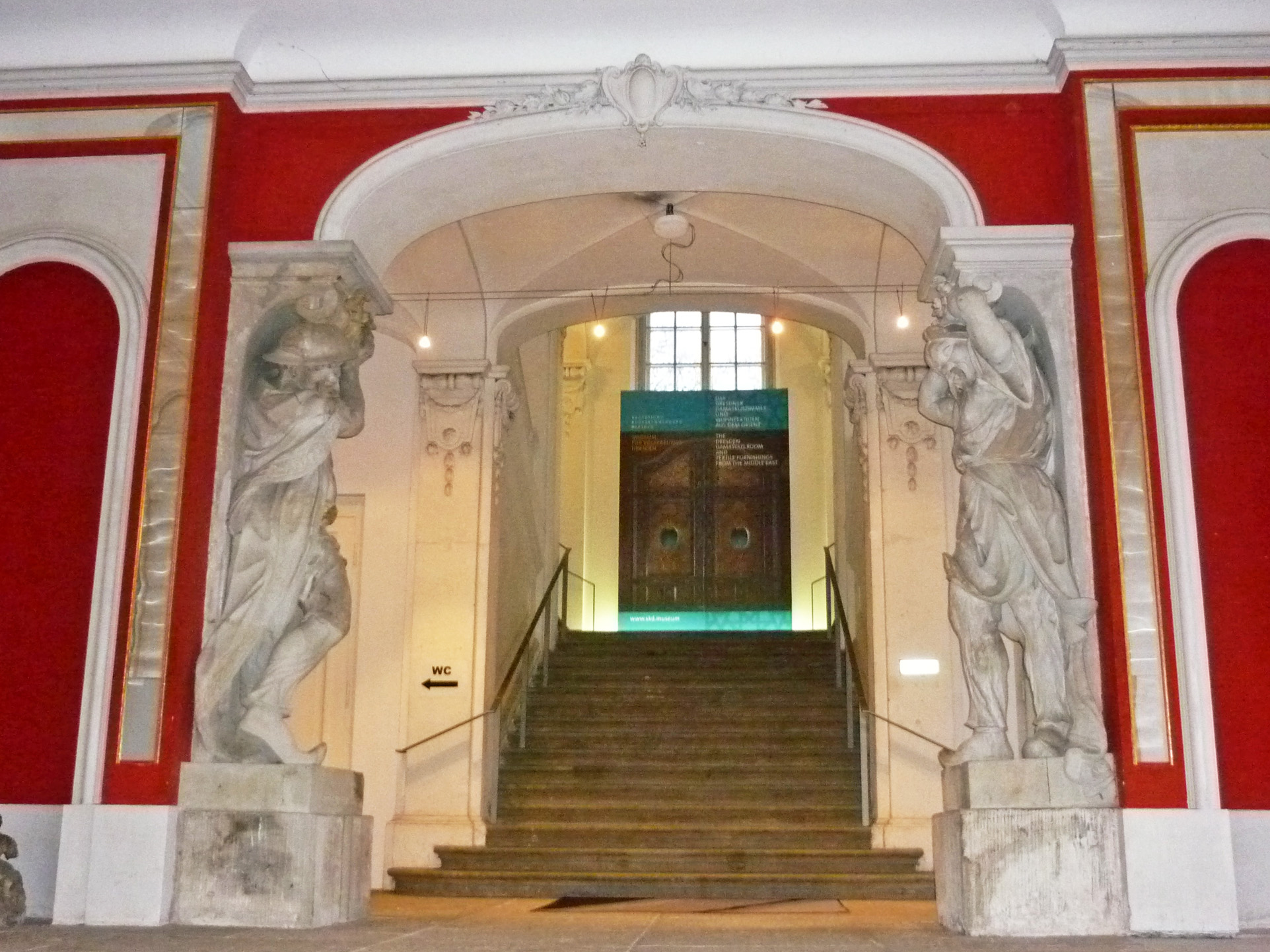
Atlantes in the main entrance by Johann Matthäus Oberschall

The Japanese Palace (German: Japanisches Palais) is a Baroque building in Dresden, Saxony, Germany. It is located on the Neustadt bank of the river Elbe.

== History ==
Built in 1715, the palace was extended from 1729 until 1731 to house the Japanese porcelain collection of King Augustus the Strong, which is now part of the Dresden Porcelain Collection. More Japanese crafts collections were intended to be housed there. Despite this intention, it was never used for the collection and instead served as the Saxon Library. The palace was designed by architects Pöppelmann, Longuelune and de Bodt.

The Japanese Palace was damaged during the allied bombing raids on 13 February 1945. The restoration of much of the building and its gardens was completed in the 1980s by the French government.

Today, it houses three museums: the Museum of Ethnology Dresden, the State Museum for Pre-History (Landesmuseum für Vorgeschichte) and the Senckenberg Natural History Collection (Senckenberg Naturhistorische Sammlungen Dresden).

== See also ==
- List of Baroque residences
