= Hieronimo Miani =

Hieronimo Miani, also known as Hieronymus Miani, was an Italian history painter, who worked in Denmark as both a painter to the royal court of King Christian VI, and as a teacher.

He was born in Venice, Italy, and was in the service of Karl Philip Emanuel of Pfalz in Mannheim, Germany before being called to Denmark in 1739 to work for the royal court of King Christian VI.

One of the court’s biggest projects at the time was the building and decoration of Christiansborg Palace in Copenhagen 1733-1745, for which Miani painted a large plafond or ceiling decoration with religious theme. The work was entitled "Uretfærdighedens og lasternes flugt for den retfærdige Guds åsyn" ("The Flight of Injustice and Vices at the Sight of the Just God"), and was painted 1739-1740. An oil painting of the same theme is in the collection of the Danish National Gallery (Statens Museum for Kunst).

He also painted two large figure paintings from the story of Moses, as well as a painting of then Crown Prince Frederik V on horseback. These were all lost in the Christiansborg fire of 1794. An engraving based on the portrait of Frederik V still exists.

In 1740 he and French sculptor, Louis August le Clerc, took over the leadership of the newly formed Christian VI’s Art Academy, The Drawing and Painting Academy (Tegne- og maleriakademiet), which had been left without a leader when Hendrick Krock died in 1738, This academy would eventually become the Royal Danish Academy of Art (Det Kongelige Danske Kunstakademi) in the mid-1750s.

Miani and le Clerc were both named professors at the Academy, while painter Marcus Cardes and medallionist Georg Wahl were freehand drawing teachers (informatorer).

On 1 February 1740 the Academy opened its doors to all interested students, not only artists, but also art lovers and such professionals and handworkers for whom drawing could be an asset. A Royal Resolution of 24 August 1740 provided a measly subsidy of 500 Rdl from the King’s discretionary funds, and conditions at the school were miserable.

For some period of time starting in 1744 the model school, which had only 10-16 students, took place at the Widow Lyders's house on Gammelstrand where Miani was lodging.

Among Miani's students were Johannes Wiedewelt and Peter Cramer.

Miani left Denmark in 1745-1746 with a royal gift (severance pay), and returned to Italy. le Clerc continued alone in the role of Academy director after Miani's departure, and until architect Nicolai Eigtved took full control over the Academy.

== See also ==
- List of Danish painters
