= Årstad, Falkenberg Municipality =

Årstad
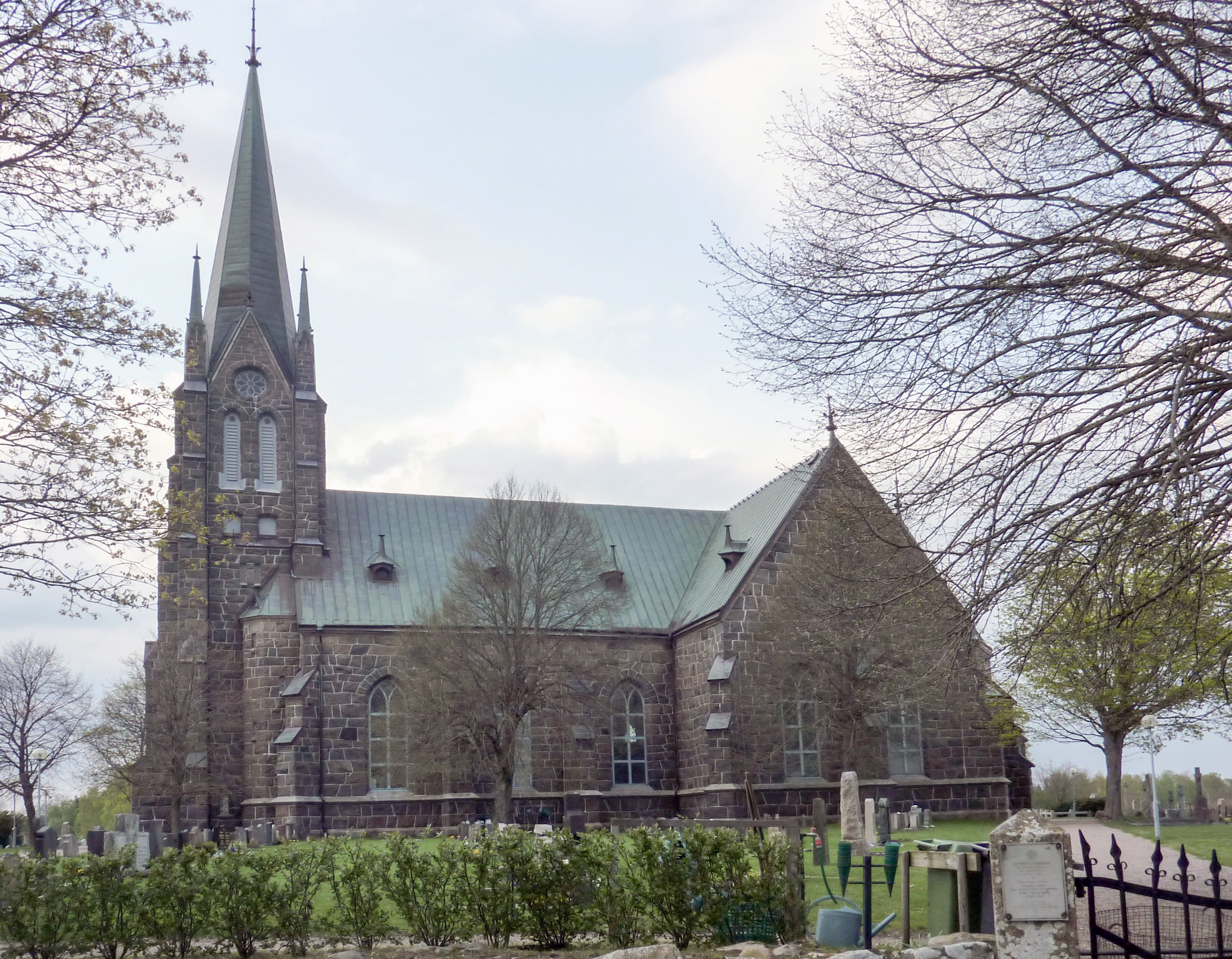
- Årstad Church and cemetery

- Location within Halland Location within Sweden
- Coordinates: 56°55′N 12°40′E
- Country: Sweden
- Province: Halland
- County: Halland County
- Municipality: Falkenberg Municipality

Area
  - Total: 0.37 km^{2} (0.14 sq mi)

Population (31 December 2010)
  - Total: 284
  - Density: 773/km^{2} (2,000/sq mi)
- Time zone: UTC+1 (CET)
  - Summer (DST): UTC+2 (CEST)

Årstad is a locality situated in Falkenberg Municipality, Halland County, Sweden, with 284 inhabitants in 2010.
