= Carl Gustaf Pilo =

Swedish painter (1711–1798)

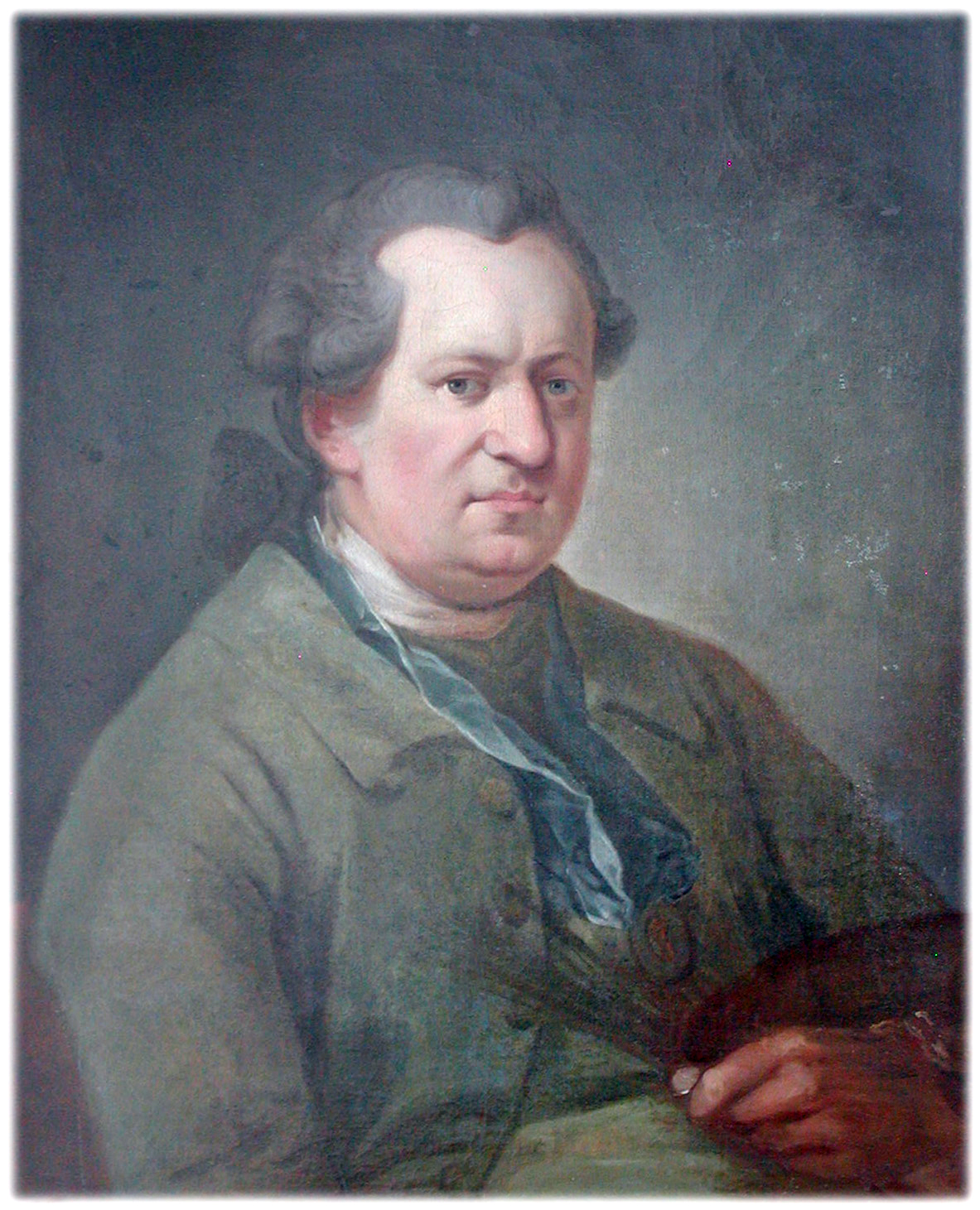
Self-portrait of Carl Gustaf Pilo

Carl Gustaf Pilo (5 March 1711 – 2 March 1793) was a Swedish painter. Pilo worked extensively in Denmark as a painter to the Danish Royal Court and as professor and director at the Royal Danish Academy of Art (Danish: Det Kongelige Danske Kunstakademi), as well as in his native Sweden.

His prolific output in Denmark consisted mainly of portraits of royalty and the nobility, but included also genre paintings in the Dutch style. For over two decades, he was acknowledged as the foremost portrait painter in Denmark. In addition to Peder Als, other students of his were Per Krafft and Lorens Pasch. Pilo is most famous for his masterly painting, "The Coronation of Gustaf III" commissioned by King Gustav III of Sweden.

== Early years ==
Carl Gustaf Pilo was born on the farm Göksäter in Runtuna Parish near Nyköping, Södermanland, Sweden to painter Olof (Oluff) Pilo (Pijhlou) and Beata Jönsdotter Sahlstedt. Early information about his career contains many inconsistencies, due to disagreement between two sources contemporary with his life. He probably received his early training from his father, who had earned his living as a young man as a decorative painter at Drottningholm and Stockholm Palace, although other indications say that he was trained by a painter named Crisman in Stockholm. Training for Pilo would have begun in Stockholm as early as 1723.

Pilo's career began as a craft painter. He became an apprentice in 1731. According to Anton Friedrich Büsching (1754) Pilo traveled through Germany to Vienna 1734-36; this however is contradicted by Thure Wennberg (1794) who insists that Pilo never traveled out of Scandinavia but instead was a student at the newly established Swedish Drawing Academy in 1735. He probably worked as a craft painter between 1733 and 1738.

== Career start in Skåne ==
Pilo lived 1738-1741 in Scania where he may have worked as a craft painter for two Scanian noble families; the Lewenhaupt family and the Baron Malte Ramel family. Pastoral drawings from this time indicate that he may have painted decorations at some estate. He was reputed to be a competent portraitist, and is reported to have painted a large family picture for the widow Countess Lewenhaupt. During these years in Skåne he also produced portraits, although it is not evident from the quality of his work that he ever received professional instruction at this point in his career.

== Continued career in Denmark ==
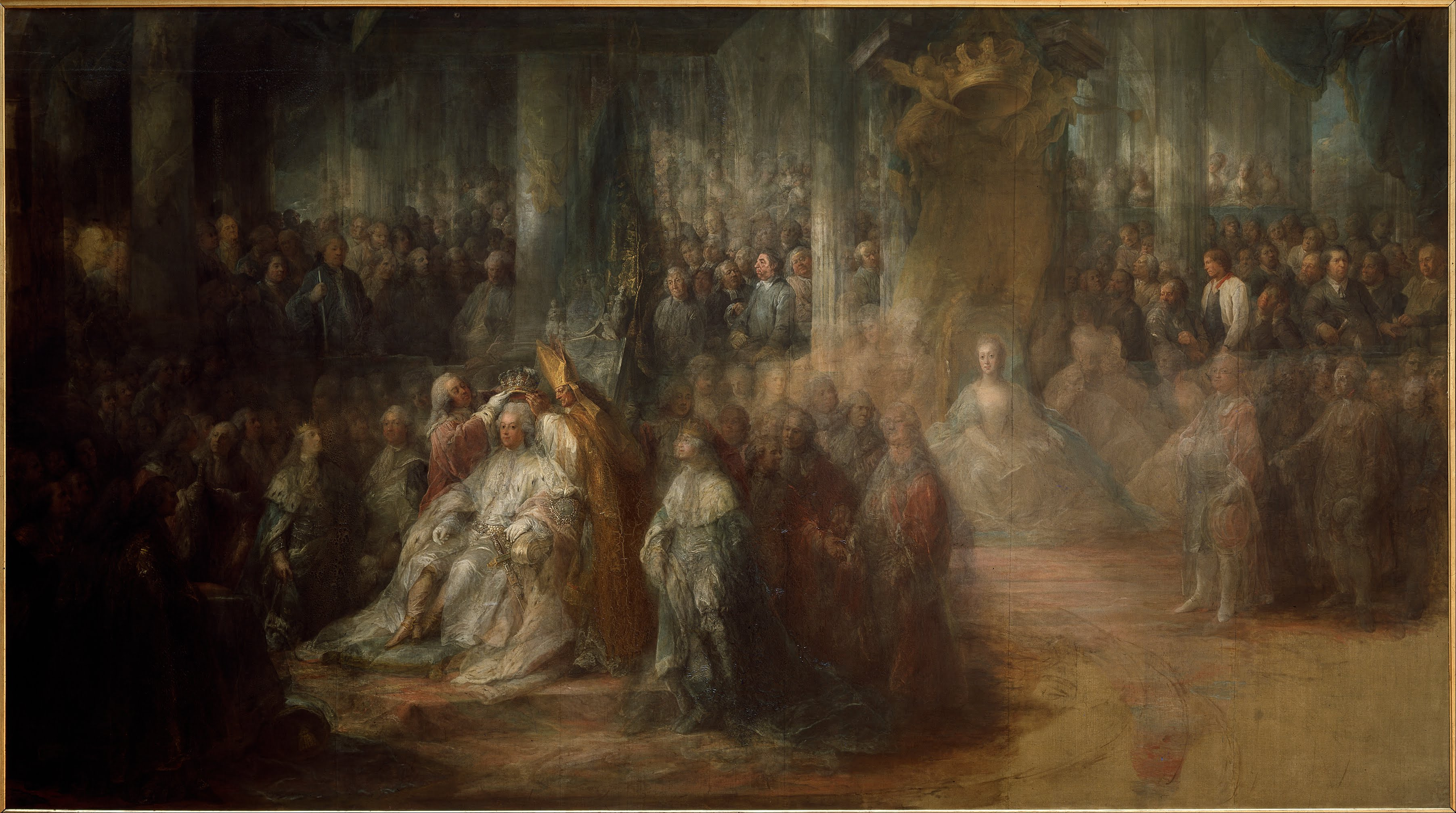
The Coronation of Gustaf III, in the collection of the National Museum, Stockholm, Sweden

In early 1741, Pilo left Skåne, and moved to Copenhagen, Denmark. He brought with him to Denmark a letter of introduction from Charlotte Amélie Dorothée Desmarez, governess at the Ramel residence and his future wife, to her brother-in-law C.G. Almer, language teacher at the National Cadet Academy (Landkadetakademiet) in Copenhagen. He started working as drawing teacher at the Academy on 4 April 1741, teaching the sons of Danish nobility, the royal pages and cadets.

He continued his career as a portraitist in Denmark. He painted an enthusiastically received portrait of Crown Princess Louise of Great Britain, the wife of the future King Frederick V of Denmark, one of centenarian Christian Jacobsen Drakenberg in 1742 and another of Christian Lerche in 1743. He concentrated on developing his craft during the 1740s, and probably drew from model in 1744. His duties soon expanded at the Academy; when on 28 June 1745 he became supervisor of drawing instruction, and began making portraits for King Christian VI. In the years 1745-1747 he began to introduce rococo into his artwork, as seen in his portraits of Countess Louise Sophie of Danneskiold-Samsøe and Adam Gottlob Moltke.

== Success at the Royal Court and Academy ==
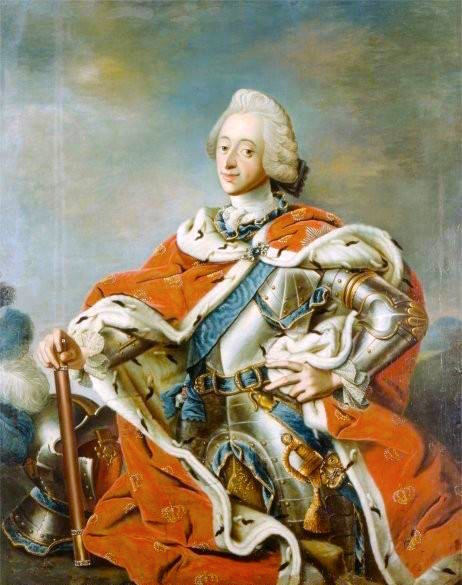
Portrait of King Frederik V of Denmark, in the collection of the Altona Museum in Hamburg, Germany

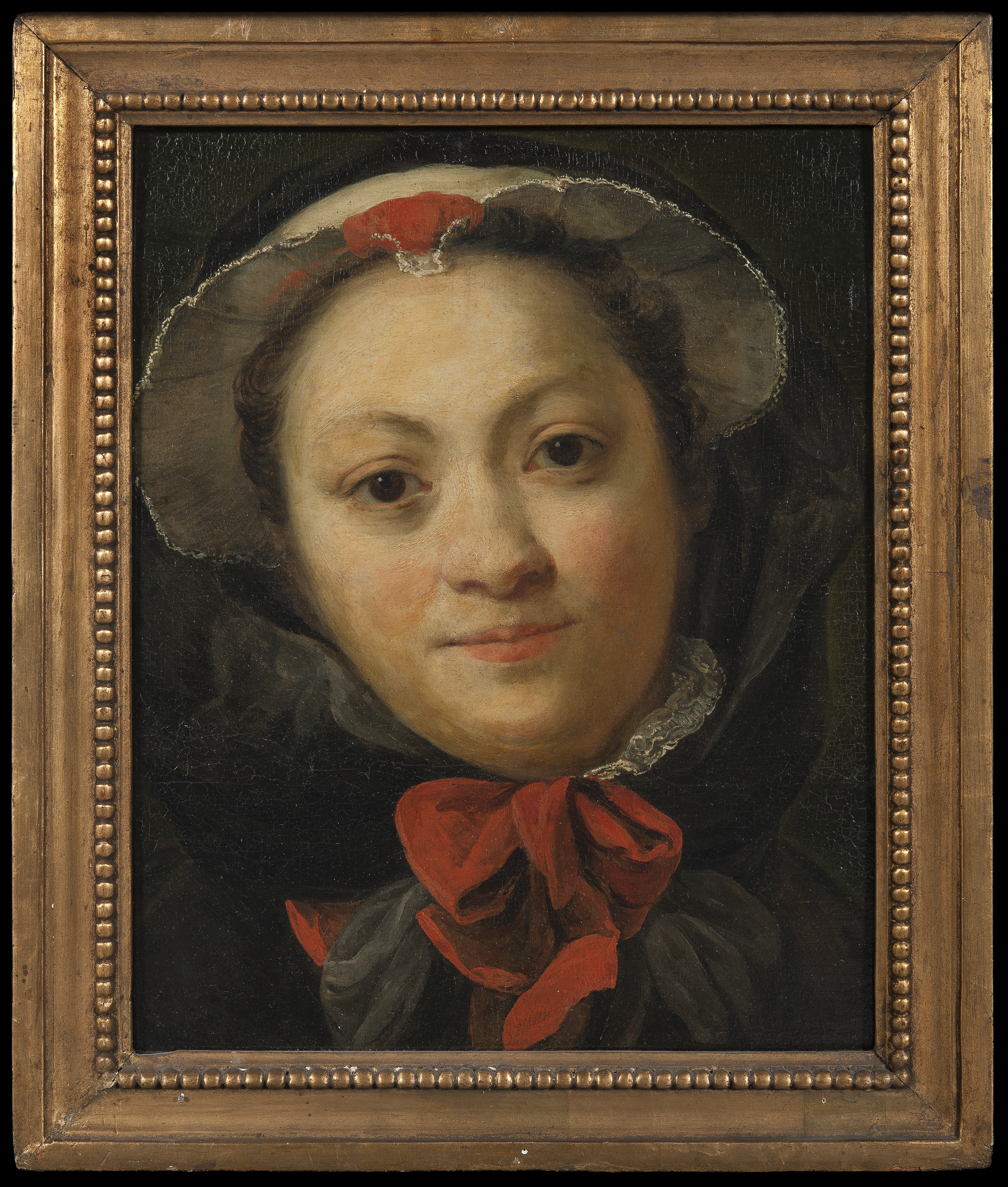
Portrait of Mrs Charlotta Pilo, née Desmarez, the artist's wife. In the collection of the Nationalmuseum, Stockholm. The National Museum of Fine Arts, Stockholm

In 1747, Pilo was named painter to the royal court under the newly crowned King Frederik V, whose duties also included the supervision and restoration of paintings at the royal residences. After several years development he became fully employed by the court and paintings streamed out of his studio.

In 1748, Pilo was named professor at the Drawing and Painting Academy (Tegne- og Malerakademiet), predecessor to the Royal Danish Academy of Art (Det Kongelige Danske Kunstakademi), along with Marcus Tuscher and Johann Friedrich Gerhard. The Academy was then located in the Post Office (Postamts) building behind the Stock Exchange, and was then managed and supervised by Nicolai Eigtved, architect and royal building master. In late summer 1748, the Academy moved to the floor above the Crown Prince's stables at Christiansborg Palace, where Eigtved had his offices, while the model school continued on Gammelstrand, where Hieronimo Miani, former leader of the Academy, had started the studio. Eigtved, the first Dane to exercise some control in the Academy to this point, became the Academy's first Director in 1751.

Pilo painted a full figure portrait of the king, "Frederik V in Coronation Outfit" ("Frederik V i kroningsdragt") in 1751, which is now in the collection of the Danish National Gallery.

The Academy moved to Charlottenborg, and became dedicated as the Royal Danish Academy of Art on 30 March 1754, after inspiration from the French Académie française. Pilo gave the welcoming speech to King Frederick V, not Eigtved. Eigtved was removed from the Director's position a few days later, and the directorship went to a Frenchman, Jacques Francis Joseph Saly. Pilo became a member of the Academy that same year.

During the early years of the Academy most of the artists and architects who served in leading positions, both managerial and educational, were not Danish. It would be some time before Danes took a leading role in the Academy. Eigtved died two months later on 7 June 1754.

Around 1757, neoclassicism began to replace rococo as the popular style, and his works became more romantic and dramatic with focus on shadow and light effects, and with more attention paid to depicting the models. Another inspiration for his changing style was the possibility to study first-hand the works of Rembrandt and other great Dutch Masters from the 17th century, works that in these years were being collected by Moltke and the royal painting collection. Pilo was also inspired by French painter Louis Tocqué, who visited Denmark 1758-1759.

Pilo was drawing instructor for Crown Prince Christian VII in 1759. Around 1760 he made portraits of Adam Gottlob Moltke, his wife, and Anna Margrethe Juel which foreshadowed the arrival of Louis XVI style to Denmark.

He became a member of the Academy of Art in Augsburg 1759, and a member of the Academy of Art in St. Petersburg 1770. He exhibited at Charlottenborg in 1769.

The royal court set a high demand on Pilo's productivity in the years 1748-1767, having purchased more than 50 portraits of King Frederik V.

Under the absolute monarchy of the times the Academy's fortunes were dependent on both the good will and the whims of the King and his emissaries. Pilo succeeded Jacques Saly in 1771 to the leadership of the Academy, and worked to get the Academy a protectorship under the Crown Prince Frederik VI, who was given an honorary title in 1772.

== Downfall ==
Danish art was well served by the presence of foreign artists at the Academy until there was a reaction to foreigners in 1771-1772 after both the ouster of German Johann Friedrich Struensee from the Danish Royal Court, and Swedish King Gustav III's coup d'état which turned Danes against Sweden.

On 31 August 1772, Pilo received the newly established Cross of the Knight of the Order of Vasa by a Swedish emissary of Gustav III, which required Pilo to take an oath of allegiance to Sweden, the land of his birth. This was considered unacceptable for someone in service to the King of Denmark, and the ensuing royal intrigues cost him his position.

On 10 September, he was ordered by Hereditary Prince Frederick to travel within two days to Schleswig to paint a life-size portrait of the King's sister Louise, her husband Carl Count of Hesse-Kassel and their children.

Pilo rejected the assignment the same day, and submitted his resignation, which was accepted on 17 September. Thus he lost his position, ending a career of over 30 years of service to the Danish crown.

On 21 September, he received orders to leave the country within 3–4 weeks. Pilo felt that he was set up in court intrigues by Ove Høegh-Guldberg, a central figure in the court ruling Denmark at the time, Peder Als and Secretary of the Cabinet Andreas Schumacher. Als had been one of Pilo's best students, and had traveled to Rome and Paris, bringing back a strongly Italian-inspired painting style that became the rage. Als' criticism of the foreign element within the Academy helped lead not only to the downfall of Pilo himself, but to the disappearance of the many French artists at the Academy in the years after 1770.

== Return to Sweden ==
Pilo left Denmark on 10 or 11 October and arrived in Stockholm in November, after having visited the Ramel family in Skåne. He appeared before the Swedish court but received no immediate commissions. He was made an honorary member of the Royal Swedish Academy of Fine Arts in 1773, and received the Royal Order of Vasa in 1784. He traveled about between Skåne and Stockholm during 1772-1775, until settling down in his childhood town of Nyköping in 1775. Gustav III looked him up, requesting him to paint the coronation. He wanted something to match Ehrenstrahl's picture, at Drottningholm, of Charles XI's coronation. Pilo was named Director of the Swedish Academy in 1777, but first took office in 1780 when he also received an apartment in Stockholm as part of his directorship at the Academy. He lived out his days at the Academy, both engaged in the Academy's business and in painting his masterpiece, the painting of Gustav III's coronation in Stockholm Cathedral, which he worked on until the very end.

== Personal life ==
Piko became betrothed to Eva Maria Malmgren of Hofterup (between Malmö and Landskrona) in 1738. The engagement became legally annulled on 5 May 1747. Pilo married Charlotte Amélie Dorothée Desmarez (Desmars) on 5 January 1750 at Maltesholm Castle. He died in Stockholm on 2 March 1793, and was buried at Klara Church.

== See also ==
- Art of Denmark

Cultural offices
Preceded by Jacques Saly	Director of the Royal Danish Academy of Fine Arts; 1771–1772	Succeeded by Johannes Wiedewelt
