= Marienlyst railway halt =

Railway halt in Helsingør, Denmark

Marienlyst
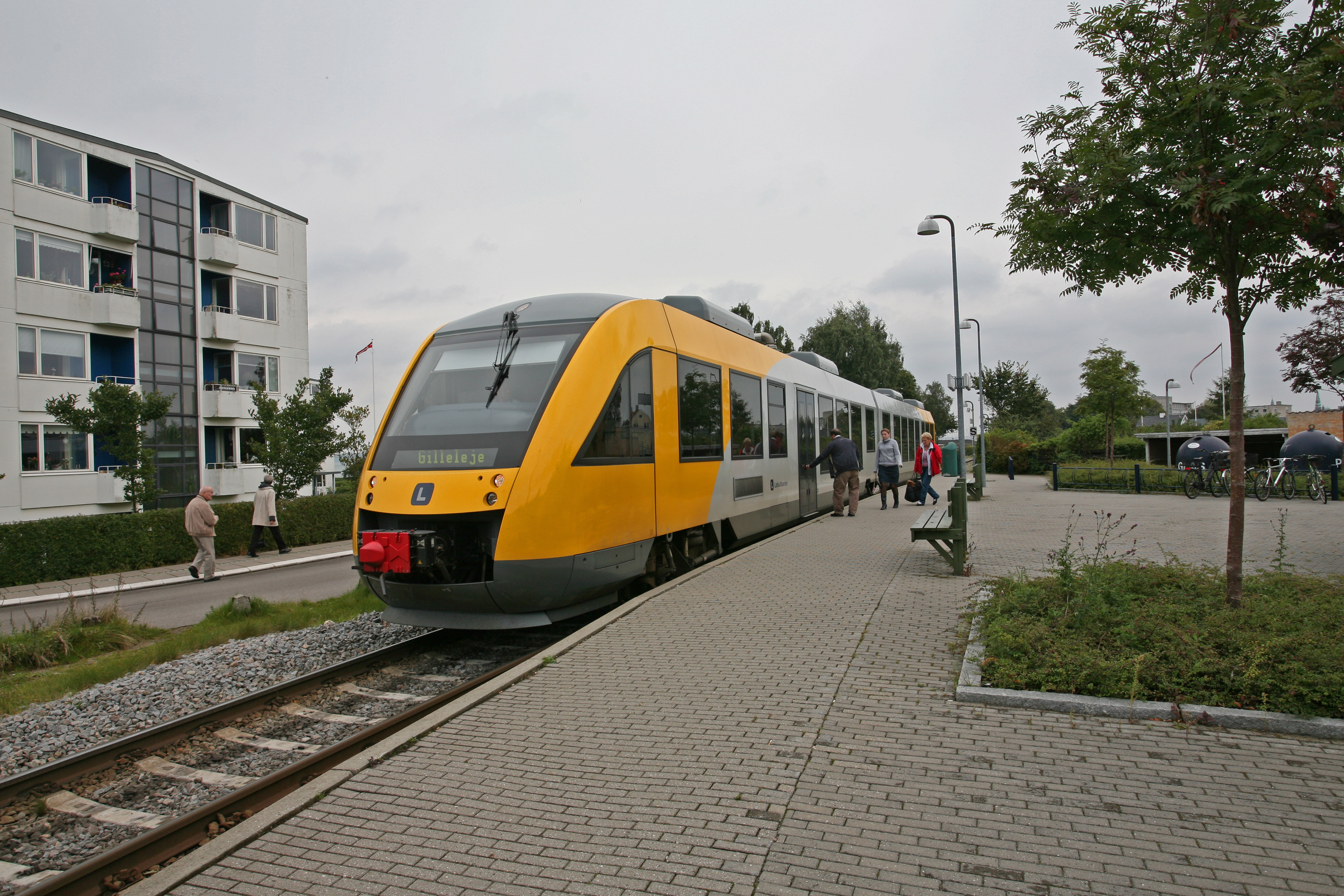
- Marienlyst halt in 2004

General information
- Location: Strandalléen 40; 3000 Helsingør; Helsingør Municipality; Denmark
- Coordinates: 56°02′35.98″N 12°36′08.28″E
- Elevation: 5.0 metres (16.4 ft)
- Owner: Hovedstadens Lokalbaner
- Operator: Lokaltog
- Line: Hornbæk Line
- Platforms: 1
- Tracks: 1

Services
Preceding station	Lokaltog	Following station
Grønnehave towards Helsingør	Hornbæk Line Local train	Højstrup towards Gilleleje
Location

Marienlyst halt is a railway halt serving the district Marienlyst in the northern outskirts of the city of Helsingør, Denmark, near Marienlyst Castle and Hotel Marienlyst.

The station is located on the Hornbæk Line from Helsingør to Gilleleje. The train services are currently operated by the railway company Lokaltog which runs frequent local train services between Helsingør station and Gilleleje station.

== See also ==
- List of railway stations in Denmark
