= Listed buildings in Nyborg Municipality =

The following listed buildings are in Nyborg Municipality, Denmark.

== Listed buildings ==
=== 5540 Ullerslev ===
Listing name	Image	Location	Coordinates	Description
Grønne Mølle		Grønne Møllevejen 2, 5540 Ullerslev	55°20′8.56″N 10°40′41.05″E	Mill and farmhouse. From 1843. Protected 1989.
Grønne Mølle		Grønne Møllevejen 2, 5540 Ullerslev	55°20′8.56″N 10°40′41.05″E	Northern building. From 1830.
Grønne Mølle		Grønne Møllevejen 2, 5540 Ullerslev	55°20′8.56″N 10°40′41.05″E	Western building. From 1830.
Grønne Mølle		Grønne Møllevejen 2, 5540 Ullerslev	55°20′8.56″N 10°40′41.05″E	Eastern building. From 1830.
Risinge		Risingevej 7A, 5540 Ullerslev	55°24′39.22″N 10°42′47.53″E	North wing and dairy building. Protected 1989.
Risinge		Risingevej 7B, 5540 Ullerslev	55°24′38.16″N 10°42′46.44″E	Main building.
Risinge		Risingevej 7C, 5540 Ullerslev	55°24′37.33″N 10°42′46.28″E	South wing.

=== 5800 Nyborg ===
Listing name	Image	Location	Coordinates	Description
Aunslev Hospital		Aunslev Kirkevej 3, 5800 Nyborg	55°21′17.68″N 10°42′45.22″E	From 1755. Protected 1932.
Blegdamsgade 7		Blegdamsgade 7, 5800 Nyborg	55°18′50.65″N 10°47′12.77″E	Front building. From 1827. Protected 1959.
Blegdamsgade 7		Blegdamsgade 7B, 5800 Nyborg	55°18′50.32″N 10°47′13.03″E	Back building. From 1827.
Blegdamsgade 7		Blegdamsgade 7, 5800 Nyborg	55°18′50.65″N 10°47′12.77″E	Back building. From 1786.
Blegdamsgade 14		Blegdamsgade 14, 5800 Nyborg	55°18′50.18″N 10°47′10.00″E	Front building. From 1740. Protected 1964.
Blegdamsgade 14		Blegdamsgade 14A, 5800 Nyborg	55°18′50.22″N 10°47′9.25″E	Back building, two sheds and canopy. From 1770.
Castle Miller's House; Slotsmøllerens Hus		Torvet 10, 5800 Nyborg	55°18′47.19″N 10°47′21.61″E	Protected 1987.
Dyrehave Mill; Dyrehave Mølle		Dyrehavevej 84, 5800 Nyborg	55°18′4.48″N 10°46′49.58″E	Protected 1959.
Former iceboat station Den tidligere isbådsstation		Fyrvej 1A, 5800 Nyborg	55°17′33.47″N 10°50′51.29″E	From 1827. Protected 1950.
Gyldencrone Mansion		Kongegade 1, 5800 Nyborg	55°18′42.12″N 10°47′19.86″E	Protected 1919.
Harbour Toll House; Havnetoldkammeret		Havnegade 2, 5800 Nyborg	55°18′35.71″N 10°47′31.96″E	From 1856. Protected 1950.
Hindemae		Hindemaevej 86, 5540 Ullerslev	55°20′51.22″N 10°39′51.34″E	Main building. From 1790. Protected 1939.
Holckenhavn Castle; Holckenhavn		Holckenhavn 1, 5800 Nyborg	55°17′33.52″N 10°46′31.14″E	Manor house from the 16th century.
Jacob Encke House		Kongegade 12, 5800 Nyborg	55°18′41.07″N 10°47′26.48″E	Western side building. From 1799.
Jacob Encke House		Kongegade 12, 5800 Nyborg	55°18′41.07″N 10°47′26.48″E	Back building. From 1799.
Jacob Encke House		Kongegade 12, 5800 Nyborg	55°18′41.07″N 10°47′26.48″E	Eastern side building. From 1897.
Jacob Encke House		Kongegade 12, 5800 Nyborg	55°18′41.07″N 10°47′26.48″E	Front building. From 1799.
Juelsberg		Juelsbergvej 11, 5800 Nyborg	55°20′30.22″N 10°45′50.12″E	Manor house. Main building. From 1770. Protected 1918.
Juelsberg		Juelsbergvej 11, 5800 Nyborg	55°20′30.22″N 10°45′50.12″E	Pavilion and ice house. From 1835.
Juelsberg		Juelsbergvej 11B, 5800 Nyborg	55°20′29.37″N 10°45′51.71″E	Western building. From 1850.
Juelsberg		Juelsbergvej 11C, 5800 Nyborg	55°20′29.15″N 10°45′49.11″E	Eastern building. From 1850.
Juelsberg Optical Telegraph; Juelsberg Optisk Telegraf		Telegrafvej 2, 5800 Nyborg	55°18′56.04″N 10°46′32.33″E	Protected 1950.
Kalentegården		Korsgade 2, 5800 Nyborg	55°18′43.39″N 10°47′24.08″E	Protected 1919.
Kongegade 24		Kongegade 24, 5800 Nyborg	55°18′40.93″N 10°47′31.2″E	From 1797. Protected 1919. Former pharmacy.
Korsbrødregården		Adelgade 1, 5800 Nyborg	55°18′40.59″N 10°47′33.97″E	From around 1600.
Korsbrødregården		Korsbrødregade 2, 5800 Nyborg	55°18′40.41″N 10°47′33.25″E	From around 1300.
Korsgade 4		Korsgade 4, 5800 Nyborg	55°18′42.52″N 10°47′24.1″E	Protected 1919.
Kullerup Rectory; Kullerup Præstegård		Ferritslevvej 28A, 5800 Nyborg	55°19′0.87″N 10°42′26.57″E	From 1760. Protected 1954.
Mads Lerche House		Slotsgade 11, 5800 Nyborg	55°18′41.72″N 10°47′18.87″E	Protected 1918.
Nyborg Castle; Nyborg Slot		Slotsgade 37, 5800 Nyborg	55°18′45.78″N 10°47′12.35″E	From 1170.
Nyborg Castle; Nyborg Slot		Slotsgade 36, 5800 Nyborg	55°18′45.86″N 10°47′15.66″E	Gunpowder storehouse. From 1170.
Nyborg Fortifications; Nyborg Volde		Lindealleen 1, 5800 Nyborg	55°18′51.16″N 10°47′19.87″E	Fortifications, gates and storehouse. Protected 1918.
Nyborg Fortifications; Nyborg Volde		Lindealleen 1, 5800 Nyborg	55°18′51.16″N 10°47′19.87″E	Gate building.
Nyborg Library; Nyborg Bibliotek		Torvet 11, 5800 Nyborg	55°18′44.79″N 10°47′19.36″E	Protected 1986.
Nyborg Rectory		Korsbrødregade 4, 5800 Nyborg	55°18′40.56″N 10°47′35.09″E	Building from ca 1400. Protected 1918.
Nyborg Town Hall; Nyborg Rådhus		Torvet 1, 5800 Nyborg	55°18′45.7″N 10°47′24.86″E	Building from 1585-1586, rebuilt in 1803. Protected 1919.
Nyborg Water Tower; Nyborg Vandtårn		Møllebakken 10, 5800 Nyborg	55°18′51.31″N 10°47′4.48″E	Water tower. From 1899. Protected 1997.
Rasmus Møller House		Nørregade 1, 5800 Nyborg	55°18′44.93″N 10°47′26.47″E	Protected 1920.
Skippergade 26		Skippergade 26, 5800 Nyborg	55°18′39.48″N 10°47′38.1″E	Protected 1989.
Skippergade 26 A-D		Skippergade 26 A, 5800 Nyborg	55°18′39.6″N 10°47′38.55″E	Protected 1919.
Slipshavn Pilot Station; Slipshavn Lodsstation		Slipshavnsvej 51, 5800 Nyborg	55°17′9.91″N 10°49′32.75″E	Protected 1978.
Slotsgade 13		Slotsgade 13, 5800 Nyborg	55°18′41.75″N 10°47′17.9″E	Protected 1987.
Slotsgade 15		Slotsgade 15, 5800 Nyborg	55°18′41.82″N 10°47′17.33″E	Protected 1924.
Vindinge Church Barn; Vindinge Kirkelade		Bøjdenvej 116A, 5800 Nyborg	55°18′34.08″N 10°43′58.8″E	Protected 1945.
Vindinge Engine House; Vindinge Sprøjtehus		Rosildevænget 8M, 5800 Nyborg	55°18′27.86″N 10°43′45.5″E	Protected 1989.

=== 5853 Ørbæk ===
Listing name	Image	Location	Coordinates	Description
Glorup Manor; Glorup		Glorupvej 34, 5853 Ørbæk	55°12′22.68″N 10°42′27.79″E	Main building. From ca. 1580. Protected 1918.
Glorup Manor; Glorup		Glorupvej 34, 5853 Ørbæk	55°12′22.68″N 10°42′27.79″E	Pavilion. From 1870.
Juulskov		Juulskovvej 12, 5853 Ørbæk	55°18′1.74″N 10°41′15.52″E	Protected 1918.
Little Mill; Lille Mølle		Lillemøllevej 14, 5853 Ørbæk	55°17′2.57″N 10°42′16.42″E	Watermill. From 1827.
Little Mill; Lille Mølle		Lillemøllevej 14, 5853 Ørbæk	55°17′2.57″N 10°42′16.42″E	Western barn. From 1827.
Little Mill; Lille Mølle		Lillemøllevej 14, 5853 Ørbæk	55°17′2.57″N 10°42′16.42″E	Farmhouse. From 1827.
Little Mill; Lille Mølle		Lillemøllevej 14, 5853 Ørbæk	55°17′2.57″N 10°42′16.42″E	North-western barn. From 1827.
Little Mill; Lille Mølle		Lillemøllevej 14, 5853 Ørbæk	55°17′2.57″N 10°42′16.42″E	North-eastern barn. From 1827.
Lykkesholm		Lykkesholmsvej 20, 5853 Ørbæk	55°14′21.62″N 10°37′5.68″E	Manor house. Central main building. From 1668. Protected 1918.
Lykkesholm		Lykkesholmsvej 20, 5853 Ørbæk	55°14′21.62″N 10°37′5.68″E	Main building side wings. From 1786.
Lykkesholm		Lykkesholmsvej 20, 5853 Ørbæk	55°14′21.62″N 10°37′5.68″E	Gate. From 1640.
Ravnholt		Ravnholtvej 57, 5853 Ørbæk	55°15′39.09″N 10°34′54.96″E	Main building. Protected 1932.
Ravnholt		Ravnholtvej 57, 5853 Ørbæk	55°15′39.09″N 10°34′54.96″E	Cross building.
Rygård		Rygårdsvej 28, 5874 Hesselager	55°11′33.12″N 10°41′59.03″E	Manor house. Protected 1918.
Sentvedvej 1		Sentvedvej 1, 5853 Ørbæk	55°15′15.84″N 10°40′17.61″E	Farmhouse. From 1650. Protected 1982.
Sentvedvej 1		Sentvedvej 1, 5853 Ørbæk	55°15′15.84″N 10°40′17.61″E	Shed. From 1650.
Svindinge Hospital		Svendborgvej 71, 5853 Ørbæk	55°12′59.36″N 10°41′15.92″E	Protected 1964.
Ørbæklunde		Ørbæklundevej 1, 5853 Ørbæk	55°14′44.47″N 10°40′10.49″E	Manor house. Main building and east wing. From 1593.
Ørbæklunde		Ørbæklundevej 1, 5853 Ørbæk	55°14′44.47″N 10°40′10.49″E	South and east wings. From 1730.
Ørbæklunde		Ørbæklundevej 1, 5853 Ørbæk	55°14′44.47″N 10°40′10.49″E	Barn. From 1732.
Ørbæklunde		Ørbæklundevej 5, 5853 Ørbæk	55°14′43.9″N 10°40′6.22″E	Southern gable. From 1732.
