= Valkendorf =

Medieval Danish and Swedish noble family

Valkendorf / Walkendorff
- Noble family
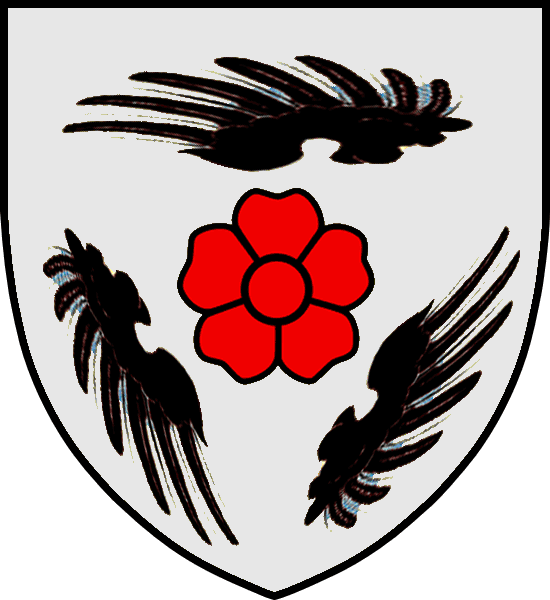
- Country: Denmark (male-line extinct); Sweden
- Founded: 14th century (Denmark); 17th century (Sweden)
- Founder: Henning von Valkendorf

The Valkendorf (Denmark) family is a medieval Danish noble family, and the Walkendorff (Sweden) family is a modern Swedish noble family.

== History ==
The family can be traced back to the 14th century with the arrival in Denmark of knight Heinrich (Henning) Valkendorf. The most prominent member of the Danish family was Christoffer Valkendorf, who served as Steward of the Realm during the early reign of Christian IV. Members of the family were major landowners on the island of Funen where they owned Glorup Manor for almost two hundred years.

== Denmark ==
It is likely that the Valkendorf family originates from Mecklenburg-Vorpommern, where remnants of a castle has been found in the small village of Walkendorf. Henning Valkendorf is first mentioned in Denmark in 1374. His son, Peder Valkendorf (mentioned 1378 and 1405), a knight, was the grand father of Councillor of the Realm Hans Valkendorf (mentioned 1468 and 1498) and district judge Axel Valkendorf (died 1483). Axel Valkendorf acquired Glorup Manor on Funen in 1479 and members of the family owned the estate until 1659. Notable members of the family include Stewart of the Realm Christoffer Valkendorff. Members of the family have also owned the estates Søbogaard, Brandstrup, Tiselholt, and Ellinge Castle.

The Danish Valkendorf branch died out in Denmark in 1747 with the passing of Major Børge Valkendorf, and went male-line extinct in 1784 after the passing of Gustaf Adolf Valkendorf in Scania. The family continued on through the descendants of Else Malena Valkendorf, daughter of Gustaf Adolf Valkendorf, and the main-line family emigrated to the United States of America in the mid-1800's where they currently reside. The modern family takes great pride in their Danish-Norwegian cultural heritage, with the family motto "De kunne ikke knække os".

== Sweden ==
The surname Walkendorff was introduced at the Swedish House of Nobility as Nr 25 in 1664 through Christopher Valkendorf (1621–1690) after the cession of the Danish province Scania (Skåne) to Sweden. The genetic connection of the modern Swedish Walkendorff family (Nr 25) to the Danish Valkendorf family is disputed.

== Notable members ==
=== Denmark ===
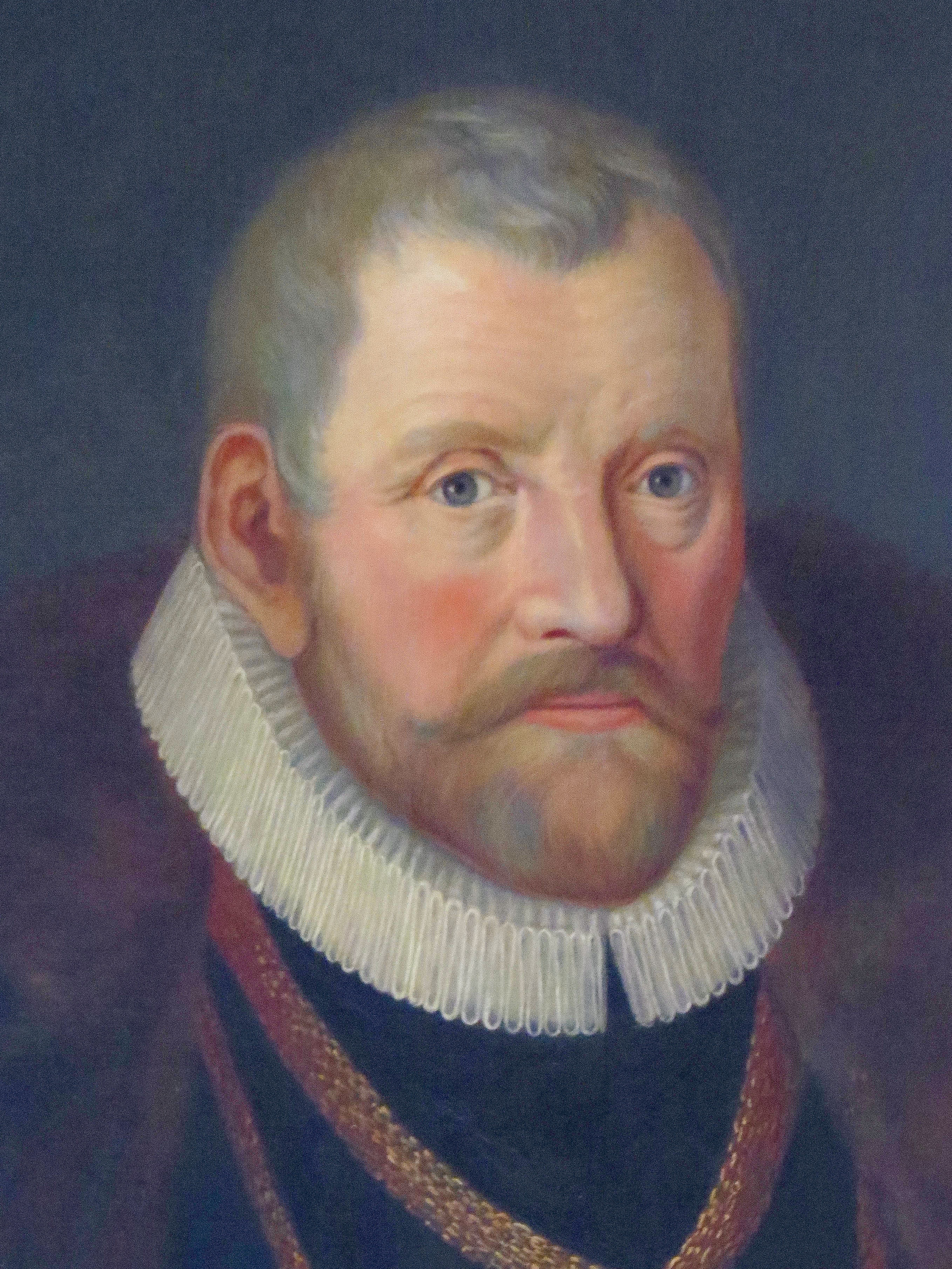
Christoffer Valkendorf

- Christoffer Valkendorff (1525–1601), statesman
- Knud Valkendorf (died 1527), rector of University of Copenhagen
- Erik Valkendorf (died 1522), bishop
- Erik Valkendorf (c. 1523 - 1605), landowner
- Jørgen Henning Valkendorf (1661–1724), district governor of Rugård Amt

== See also ==
- Brahe
- Tycho Brahe
- Bille (noble family)
- Lauritz Galtung
- Barnekow family
- Ellinge Castle - Christoffer Walkendorff was Ellinge's Manager from 1640 to 1690
- Swedification of Scania
