= Christian Joseph Zuber =

Danish Royal architect (1736–1802)

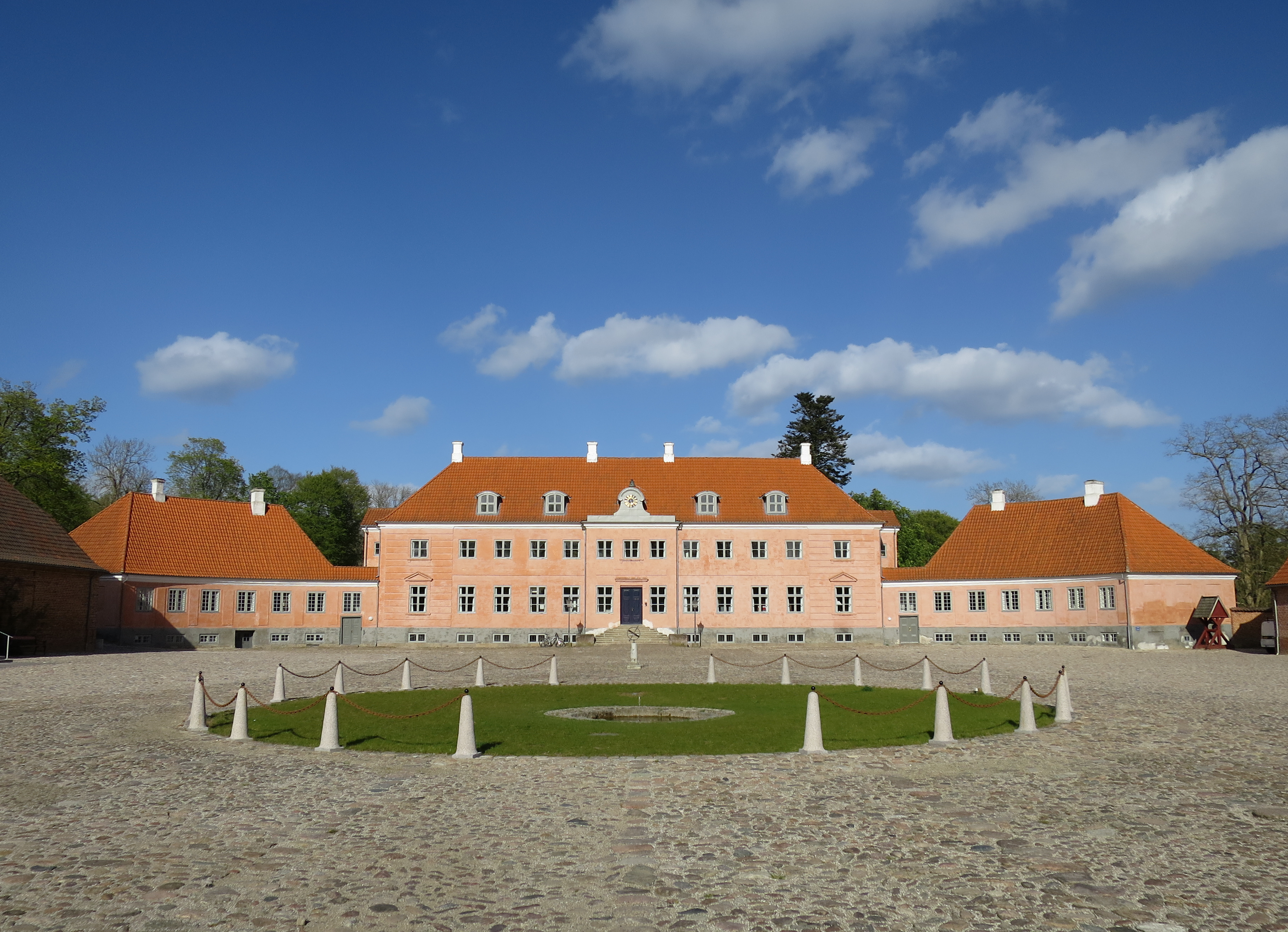
Main Building of Moesgård

Christian Joseph Zuber (11 January 1736 – 16 September 1802) was a Danish Royal architect who was strongly influenced by Nicolas-Henri Jardin.

== Early life ==
After completing grammar school, Zuber attended the Imperial Engineering Academy in Vienna and from 1759 the Royal Danish Academy of Fine Arts in Copenhagen where he was awarded the large silver medal in 1761 and the large gold medal (for designing a barracks accommodating 10,000 men) in 1762.

== Career ==
From 1760, he worked for seven years under Nicolas-Henri Jardin as architectural designer for the construction of Marienlyst Castle in Helsingør (1760–1762) and Glorup Manor on the island of Funen (from 1773). From 1766, under a grant from the Academy, he spent six years travelling in France, Italy and Austria. On his return, he built Moesgård Manor near Aarhus (1776–1778) and Rosenfeldt near Vordingborg, both strongly influenced by Jardin. Rosenfeldt is considered to be his finest work. His buildings have a Baroque tone but he was overshadowed by the more modern Caspar Frederik Harsdorff.

== Culture canon ==
Zuber is listed in the Danish Culture Canon together with Jardin in connection with the reconstruction of Glorup Manor (1773–1775).
