= Nybrogade 28 =

Building in Copenhagen

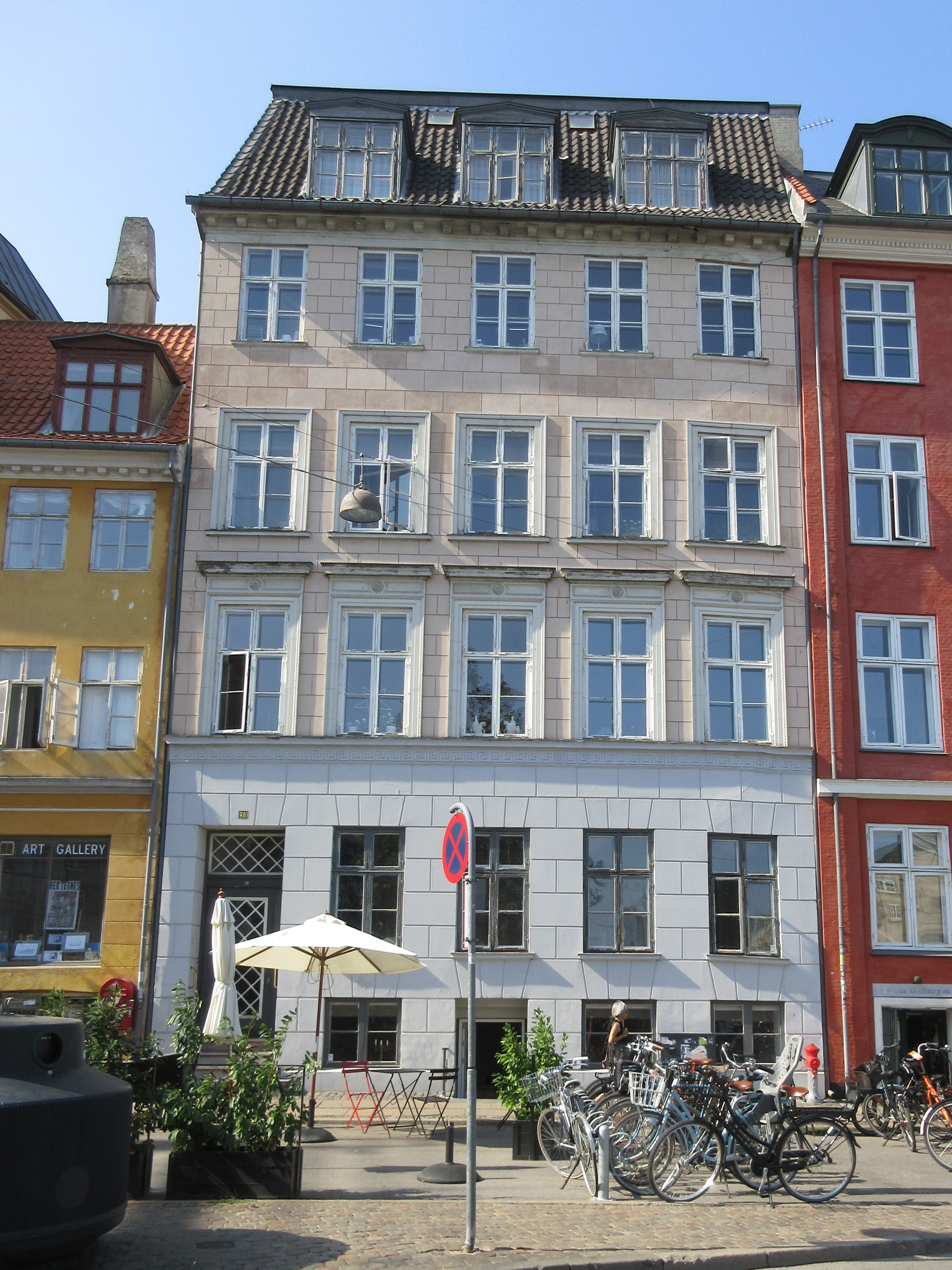
- Interactive map of the Nybrogade 28 area

General information
- Architectural style: Neoclassical
- Location: Copenhagen, Denmark
- Coordinates: 55°40′33.78″N 12°34′31.51″E
- Completed: 1852

Nybrogade 28 is a Late Neoclassical property overlooking Slotsholmen Canal in central Copenhagen, Denmark. The narrow property comprises the four-storey building towards Nyrbogade and another four-storey building at Magstræde 15 on the other side of the block as well as a side wing linking them together along one side of a small courtyard. The entire complex was listed in the Danish registry of protected buildings and places in 1945. The publishing house Forlaget Vandkunsten is based in the building. It also operates a literary venue in the building under the name Litteraturhuset (House of Literature). The activities comprise a bookshop, café and public readings, debates and other literary events.

== History ==
=== Early history ===
The property was listed in Copenhagen's first cadastre of 1689 as No. 33 in Snaren's Quarter and was owned by dyer Antoin Rentz at that time. The building in Magstræde was constructed in 1731 by master mason S. Sørensen. The property was listed in the new cadastre of 1756 as No. 26 and belonged to Otte Ehlers at that time.

=== Hendrich Høvinghoff ===
The property was home to 25 residents in four households at the time of the 1787 census. Henrik Hoving Hoff, a royal silver master (sølvpop, that is the keeper of the king's silver), resided in the building with his wife Magrethe Langge, their three children (aged two to six), two children from his first marriage (aged 12 and 13) and three maids. Maren Brandorff, a widow with a pension from Enkekassen, resided in the building with her two children (aged one and four), her brother Peder Brandorph (an assistant in the Danish Asiatic Company) and one maid. Lars Dons, a man with a pension, resided in the building with his wife Marie Magrethe (née Kittelsen), two maids and three lodgers. Thye Larsen, a workman, resided in the building with his wife Anne Kirstine.

The property was home to 32 residents in five households at the time of the 1801 census. Hendrich Høvinghoff resided in the building with his wife, four children (aged 11 to 19), one male servant and one maid. Knud Knudsen, a gatekeeper (bommand), resided in the building with his wife Ane Dorthe Jensen, their four children (aged one to eight) and three lodgers. Elise Marie Essendrup, a young widow, resided in the building with her two-year-old daughter Ane Susanne Cathrine Kinchel, her sister-in-law Ane Cathrine Johanne Kinchel and one maid. Aron Eibeschytz, a wine merchant, resided in the building with his wife Sara Levy, their four children (aged 12 to 24) and one maid. Hans Thune, a servant (lejetjener), resided in the building with his wife Inger Holm, their 11-year-old son Ole Andreas Thune and one lodger.

The property was listed in the new cadastre of 1806 as No. 22 in Snaren's Quarter. It was still owned by Høvinghoff at that time.

=== 1850 Census ===
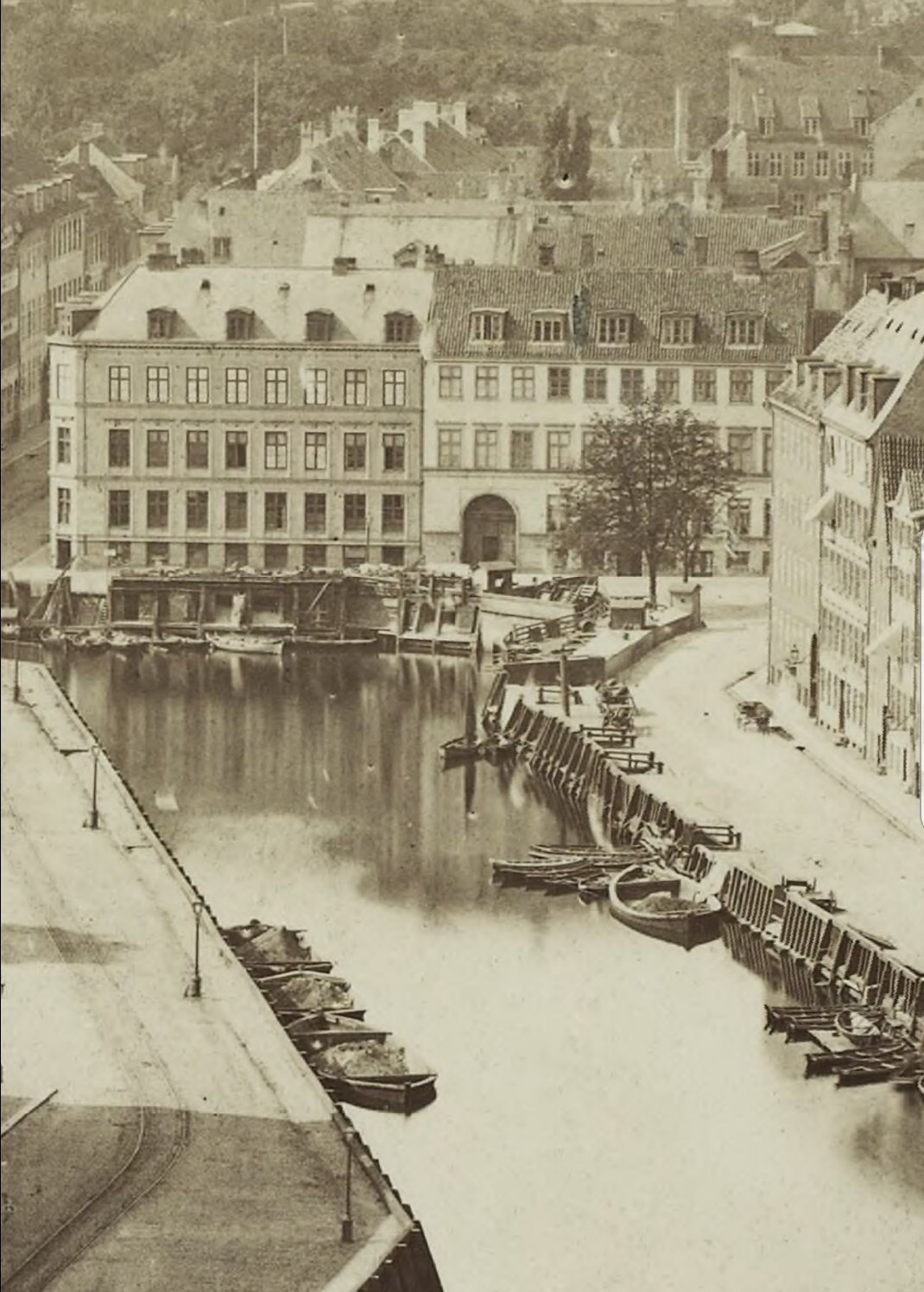
The sand depot in front of the building in the late 19th century

The building in Magstræde was home to 14 residents at the 1850 census. Niels Lunde, a sand trader, resided on the ground floor with his wife Mariane Christensen Lunde, their two-year-old daughter Fransiska Wilhelmine Lunde and 15-year-old Clemmentine Bæck. The canal front in front of the building was the site of the so-called "Sandbox" /Sandkisten), a storage facility for sand. The sand was transported to the site by barge. It was then sold by the sand traders to the so-called "sandmen", who drove around with their carriages. Women would then call down to them from the windows: "Hey samdman, come up with a skæppe!" (1 skæppe = 17.3 liter). The sand was used for polishing untreated wooden floors. Charlotte Juliane Treschow (1772–1851), a manufacturer of varnish (widow of Johann Friederich Treschow), resided on the same floor with her daughter Sophie Amalie Treschow and son Peter Treschow (student). Christian Schønveller, a servantm resided on the same floor with his wife Anne Schønveller. A. S. Ørsted, a magister artium, oribably a younger relative of Anders Sandøe Ørsted, resided on the first floor. Johanne Prytz, a 72-year-old man with a pension, resided on the same floor. I. Buschmann, a clergyman, resided on the second floor. Henrik Polzow, a master baker, resided on the second floor with his wife Susanne Polzow.

=== Hans Mortensen and the new building ===
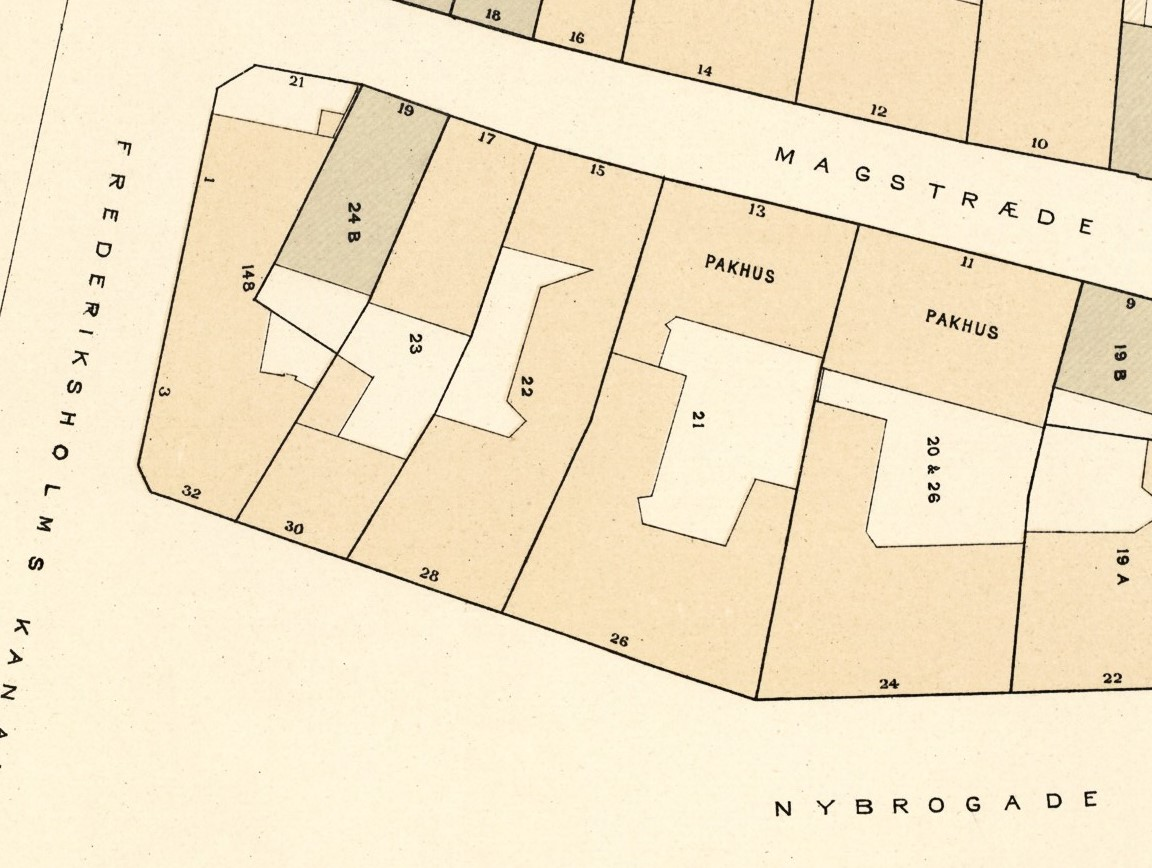
Nybrogade 28 seen on a detail from Berggreen's cadastral map of Snaren's Quarter, 1884.

The current building in Nybrogade was constructed in 1852 for master plummer Hans Mortensen and the building towards Magstræde was at the same time heightened., With the introduction of house numbering by street in Copenhagen in 1859 (as opposed to the old cadastral lot numbers by quarter), No. 22 became Nybrogade 28 and Magstyræde 15.

=== 1860 Census ===
Nybrogade 28 was at the time of the 1860 census home to a total of 26 people. Johannes Fibiger (1821–1897), assistant pastor at the Garrisnon Church, resided on the first floor with his wife, unmarried sister-in-law and a maid. Lavrik Theodor Dahlman, a master saddler, resided on the second floor with his wife, four children and two maids. He was together with his brother the owner of Brødrene F. & L. Dahlman, a saddler's workshop founded by their father in 1807 and since 1825 trading with a royal warrant. The Dahlman family shared the second floor with two elderly, unmarried sisters, Sophie and Petronelle Fridsch, both in their 70s, who were daughters of former Supreme Court justice Mads Fridsch. They lived there with a chamber maid and two maids. Poul Christensen Hyldgaard, the proprietor of the tavern in the basement, also had his home there. Magstræde 15 was at the time of the 1860 census home to an additional 22 people.

=== 20th Century ===
Nybrogade 28 was at the time of the 1906 census home to a total of 21 people. They included the painter Astrid Louise Richter. The painter Herman Vedel (1875–1948) resided in the garret of Nybrogade 28 from 1908 to 1910.

In 1835, Pippo Ranzoni opened Ristorante Italiano in the building. Born in Bergamo Pippo Ranzoni (1885–1040) had from 1908 served as concertmaster at the Italian opera in Cairo and Alexandria. He came to Denmark in 1912 where he initially played the violin in the orchestra of Palace Hotel. In 1914, he was promoted to conductor of the hotel's new 30-man symphony orchestra which was created as a counterpart to the music programme at Hotel d'Angleterre. The orchestra performed in the Palace Hotel during the winter season and in Hotel Marienlyst in the summer time. He was also frequently used as a conductor in the Tivoli Concert Hall and spent two seasons in St. Maurice. He died in 1949.

The building was later acquired by the lawyer Aage Rold Lundbye (30 December 1886-). He had started his own law firm in 1923.

== Architecture ==
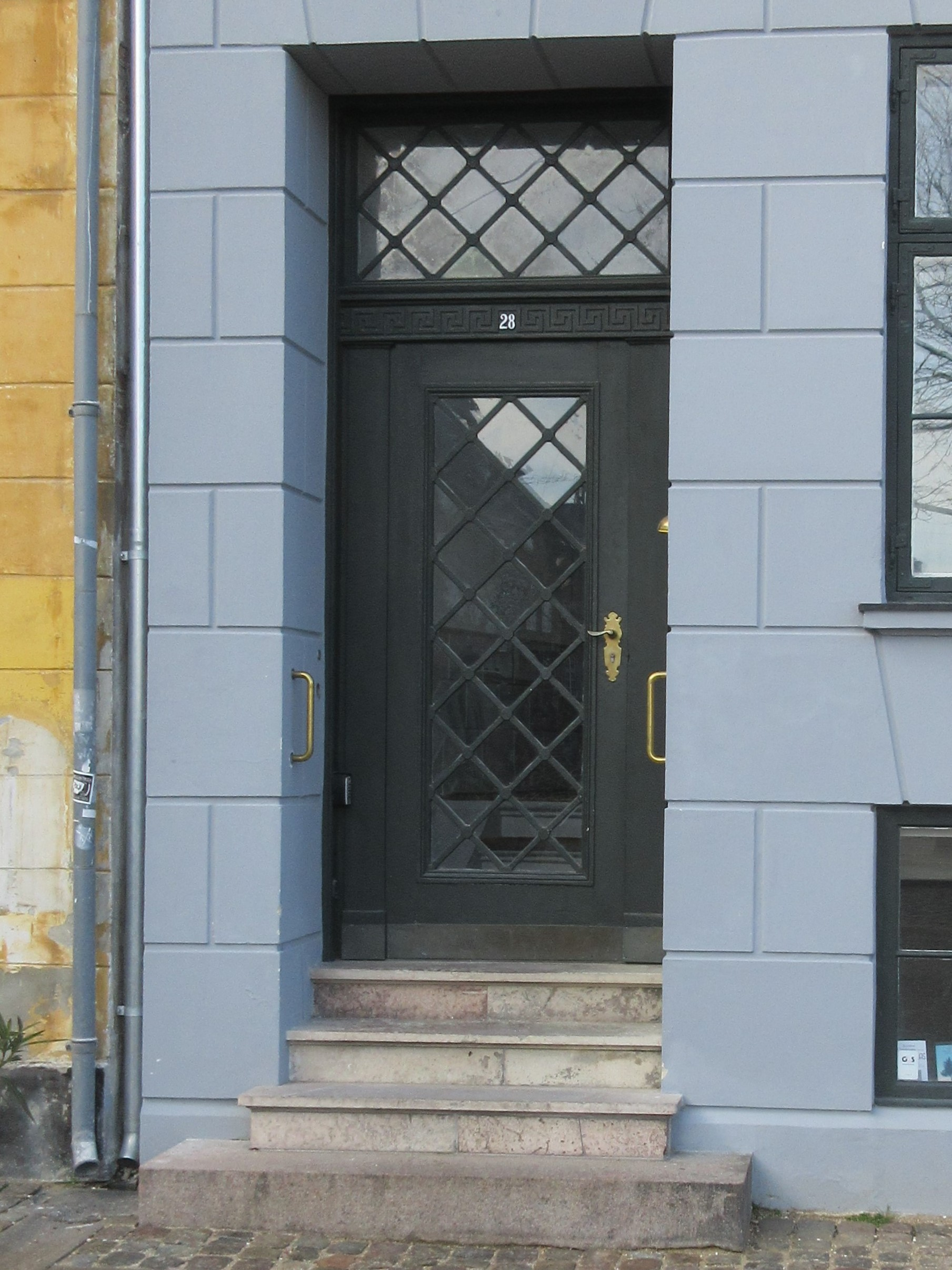
Door of Nybrogade 28

Mybrogade 29 is in four storeys over a raised cellar. The building material is brick. The front of the building has a somewhat unusual finishing with shadow joints on the entire facade. It is painted in a pale grew colour on the ground floor and white on the upper floors. The two sections are divided by a Greek key frieze below the windows on the first floor. The facade is finished by a dentillated cornice. The windows are painted white, except for the ones on the ground floor which are green. The windows on the ground floor, second floor and third floor have sills. The windows on the first and second floor are accentuated with decorative framing. The ones on the first floor have rosettes and hood moulds. The Mansard roof, clad in bluish tiles towards the street and red ones towards the yard, features three dormer windows on each side. A chimney is placed in the gable towards No. 26.

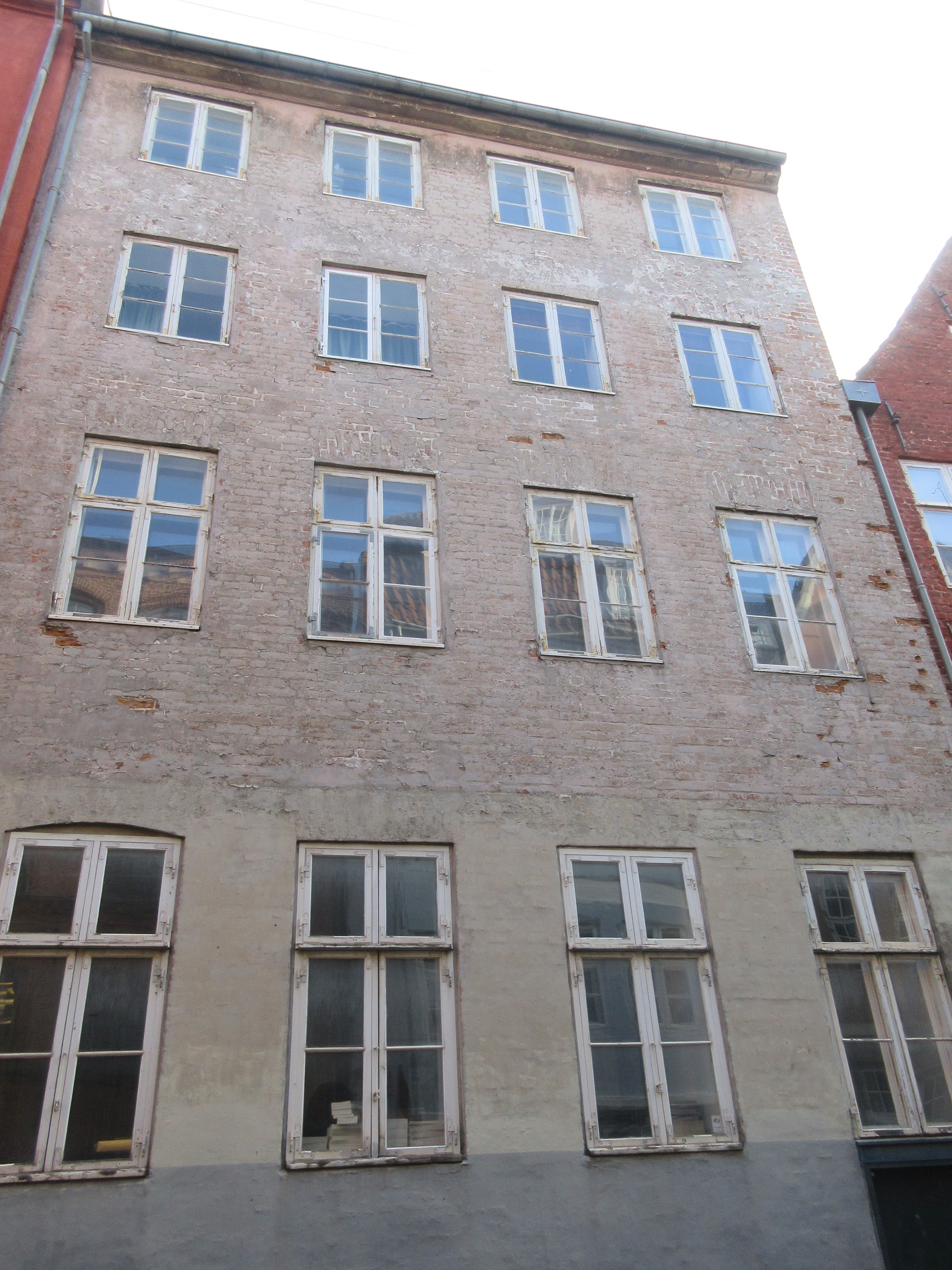
Magstræde 15

A to bays wide, perpendicular side wing extends from the rear side of the building. The two wings are brought together by a canted corner bay. Theside wing has a monopitched red tile roof with two dormer windows and a chimney. The facade of the side wing, the two exposed bays of the front wing and the rear side of Magstræde 15 are all yellow-washed.

Magstræde 15 us also a four-storey building but just four bays wide. The building material is again brick. The simple front is plastered and painted in a pale grey colour. In the southernmost bay is a green-painted door and the cellar windows have green-painted shutters. The facade is finished by a simple, white-painted cornice. The pitched roof is clad in red tiles.

== Today ==
The building is today owned by Overretssagfører Aage Rold Lundbyes Fond, a charitable foundation established by its former owner. The publishing house Forlaget Vandkunsten relocated to the building in 2017. It is also hosting a wide range of literary events under the name Litteraturhuset (House of literature). The activities comprise a book and a cafë as well as public readings, debates and other literary events.
