= Adam Gottlob von Krogh =

Danish colonel (1768–1839)

- Born: 16 May 1768
- Died: 17 January 1839 (aged 70)
- Military career
- Allegiance: Denmark
- Service years: 1786–1836
- Rank: Colonel
- Awards: Order of the Dannebrog, Grand Cross

Adam Gottlob von Krogh (16 May 1768 – 17 January 1839) was a Danish military officer.

== Early life ==
He was the son of Major General Caspar Herman von Krogh (b. 1 December 1725 - d. 1802) and his wife Christiane Ulrica née Lerche (1 November 1730 – 21 August 1803, in Eidsvoll).

He was married to his cousin Magdalene (née von Krogh) (13 June 1775 – 19 December 1847) Daughter of the following titular Privy Councilor Frederick Ferdinand von Krogh (d. 1829).

== Military career ==
At age 12, he was sent to study at the Søakademiet in Copenhagen, receiving an appointment as Ensign to the Crown Prince's Regiment in 1786. From 1788, he was Sekondlieutenant in the Royal Guard on foot.

In 1790, he went to Lindholm to serve as page chamber of the Crown Prince at Christiansborg Palace. He was the Inspection Officer at the time of the great Christiansborg Palace fire of 1794, and was badly injured while attempting to stop the fire. In 1816, he was made Colonel. He was then director of the Sound Customs House and Chamberlain to King Frederick VI of Denmark who knighted von Krogh, Commander Order of the Dannebrog in 1828 and then bestowed him with the Grand Cross Order of the Dannebrog in 1836. He lived at Marienlyst Castle between 1796 and his death in 1839 after which Frederick VI of Denmark graciously let his widow Magdalene remain living there till her death in 1847.

== Order of the Dannebrog, Grand Cross ==
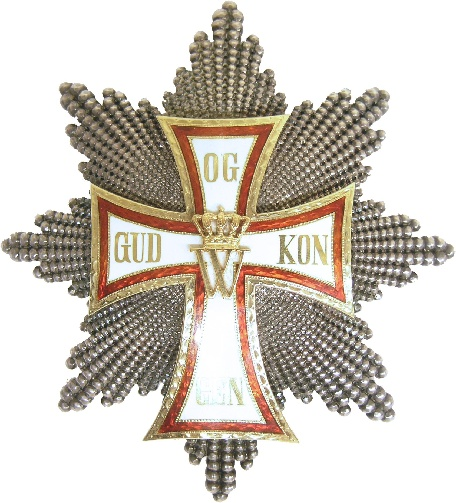
Order of the Dannebrog, Breast Star with Grand Cross

Order of the Dannebrog ribbon

== Sources ==
=== Books ===
Anker, Carl Johann (1885). Biografiske data om 330 norske: norskfødte eller for nogen tid i den norske armé ansatte generalspersoner, 1628-1885 (in Norwegian). Kristiania: A. Cammermeyer. p. 152.

Bricka, Carl Frederik (1895). DANSK BIOGRAFISK LEXIKON, tillige omfattende Norge for Tidsrummet 1537-1814 (in Danish). Vol. IX. BIND. Copenhagen: Gyldendalske Boghandels Forlag (F. Hegel & Søn).

Wad, Gustav Ludvig (1883). Personalhistorisk tidsskrift (in Danish). Vol. 5. Copenhagen: Samfundet for dansk-norsk genealogi og personalhistorie. p. 143.

=== Online ===
Müllers, W.A. "Marienlyst Slot" (in Danish). Helsingør Leksikon.
