= Johan Ludvig Mansa =

Danish landscape architect (1740–1820)

Johan L. Mansa
- Born: April 10, 1740; Zweibrücken, Germany
- Died: April 13, 1820 (aged 80)
- Occupation: Landscape gardener
- Honours: Order of the Danneborg

Johan Ludvig Mansa (10 April 1740 – 13 April 1820), was a German-Danish landscape gardener. The majority of his work was in transforming formal French gardens into English landscape gardens. Some remnants of his works can still be seen on the slope north of Marienlyst Castle in Helsingør as well as a few manors and palaces around Denmark.

== Personal life ==
Johan Ludvig Mansa was born on 10 April 1740 in Zweibrücken, Germany, where his father was palace gardener. On 1 July 1772 he married Anne Christine Voigt. After the death of his first wife, Mansa married Louise Toxwærd (b. 31 December 1769 d. 23 March 1853) on 9 October 1791 with whom he had ten children: six sons and four daughters. Louise was the daughter of merchant Henrik Christian Toxwærd, owner of Louis grove on Falster and Anna Margrethe Hauen Dorff.

== Career ==
In 1765 he went to Denmark and was gardener at Fuglsang Manor, Lolland. In the 1780s, he was appointed as a gardener and steward of Marienlyst Castle in Helsingør, Denmark and in 1794 as a gardener at Frederiksborg Castle. Finally in 1799 he was employed as a gardener and steward at Fredensborg Palace.

He was the author of "Havekatekismus eller Grundregler for nyttige Havevæxters Dyrkning i Danmark" (Basic rules for growing of useful plants in Denmark) published in 1789 and won the Kgl Danske Landhusholdningsselskab prize. One of his other books "Gardening structures the English way" also contributed to his large influence on the development of gardening and horticulture in Denmark. He was greatly appreciated by King Frederik VI of Denmark who decorated him with the Order of the Dannebrog
