= Valkendorfs Kollegium =

Dormitory in Copenhagen, Denmark

Coordinates: 55.6796°N 12.569°E

Valkendorfs Kollegium is a dormitory located in Sankt Peders Stræde in Copenhagen, Denmark. With a history that dates back to 1589, it is the oldest dormitory in Scandinavia.

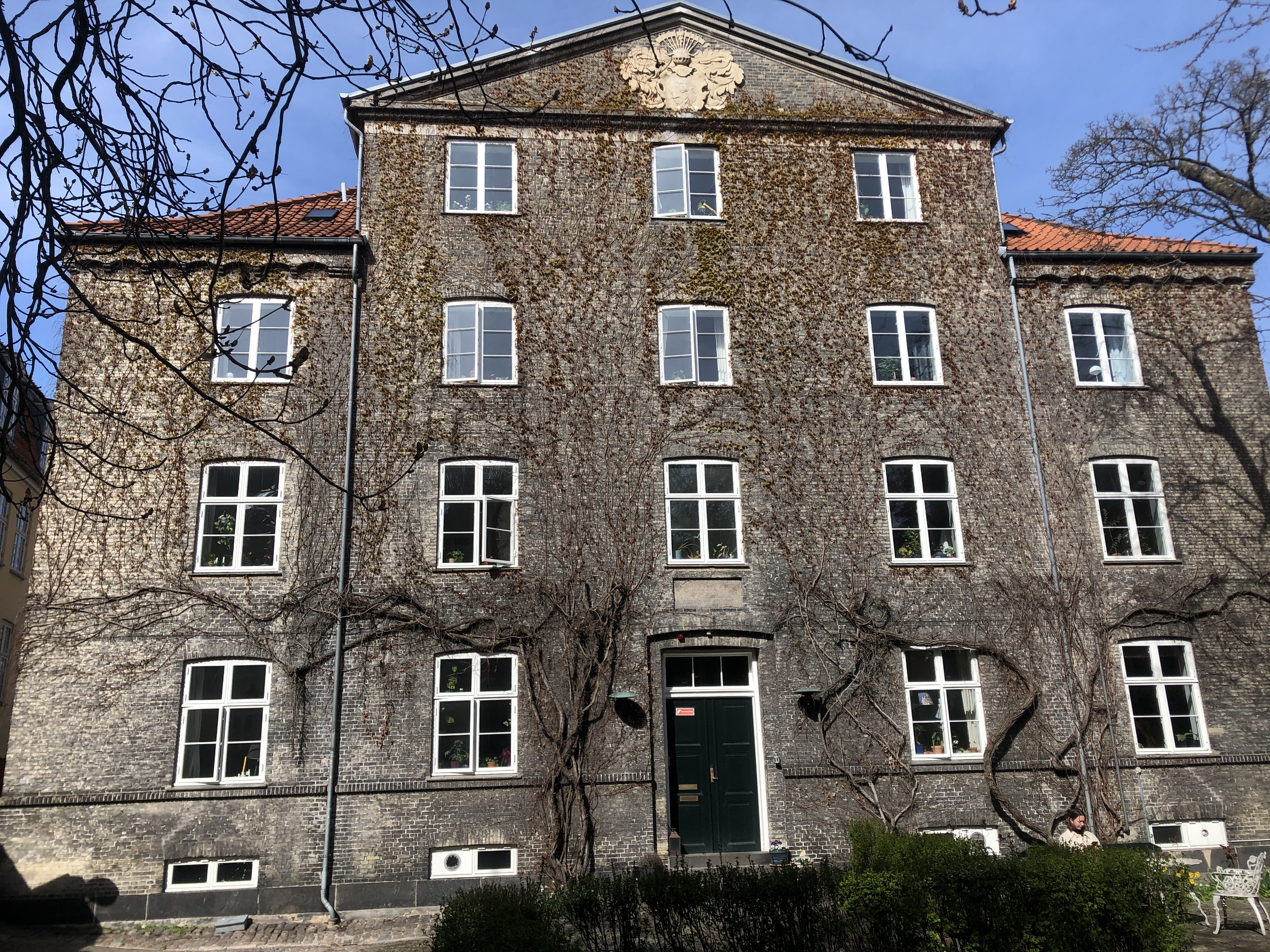

== History ==
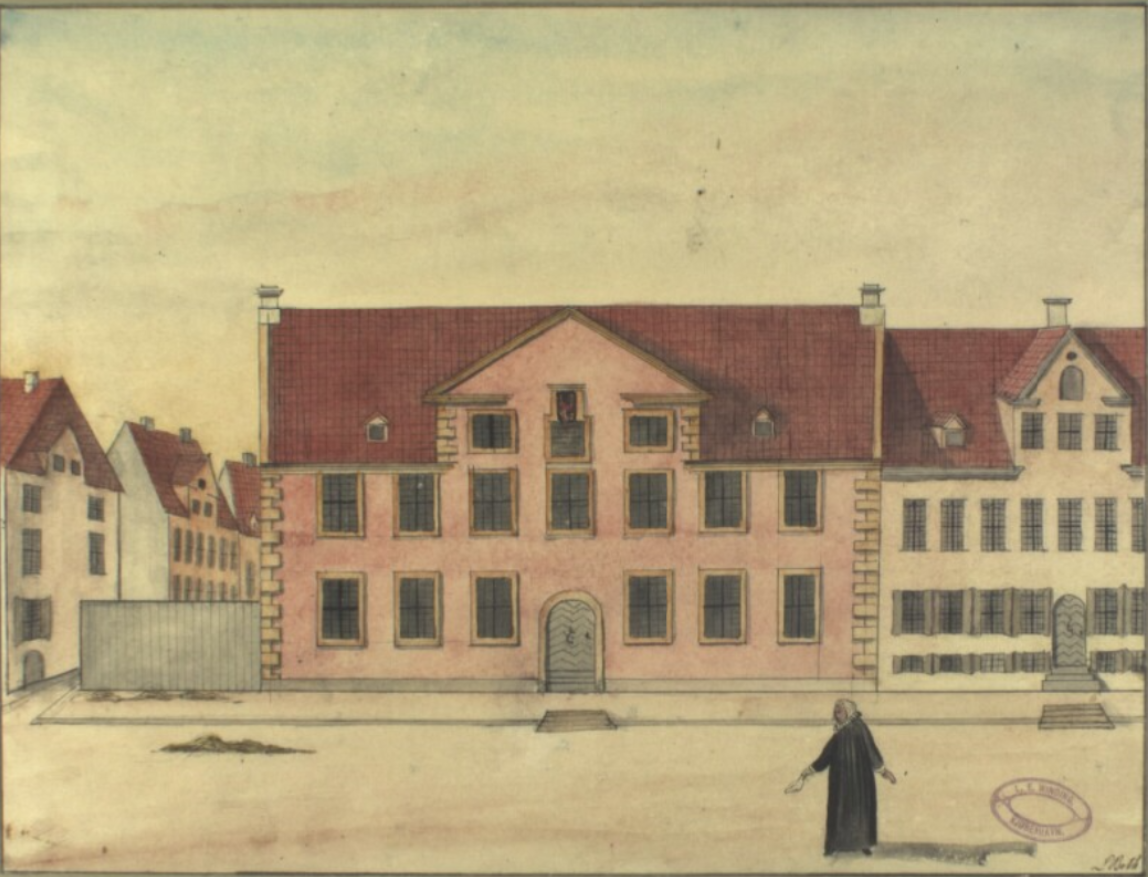
Valkendorfs Kollegium in 1749

The dormitory was founded on 26 February 1589 by the nobleman Christopher Valkendorf. The building he purchased was originally a monastery. The dormitory suffered a great deal during the Great Fire of Copenhagen in 1728. Though most of the brickwork survived, the building was rendered uninhabitable for several years.

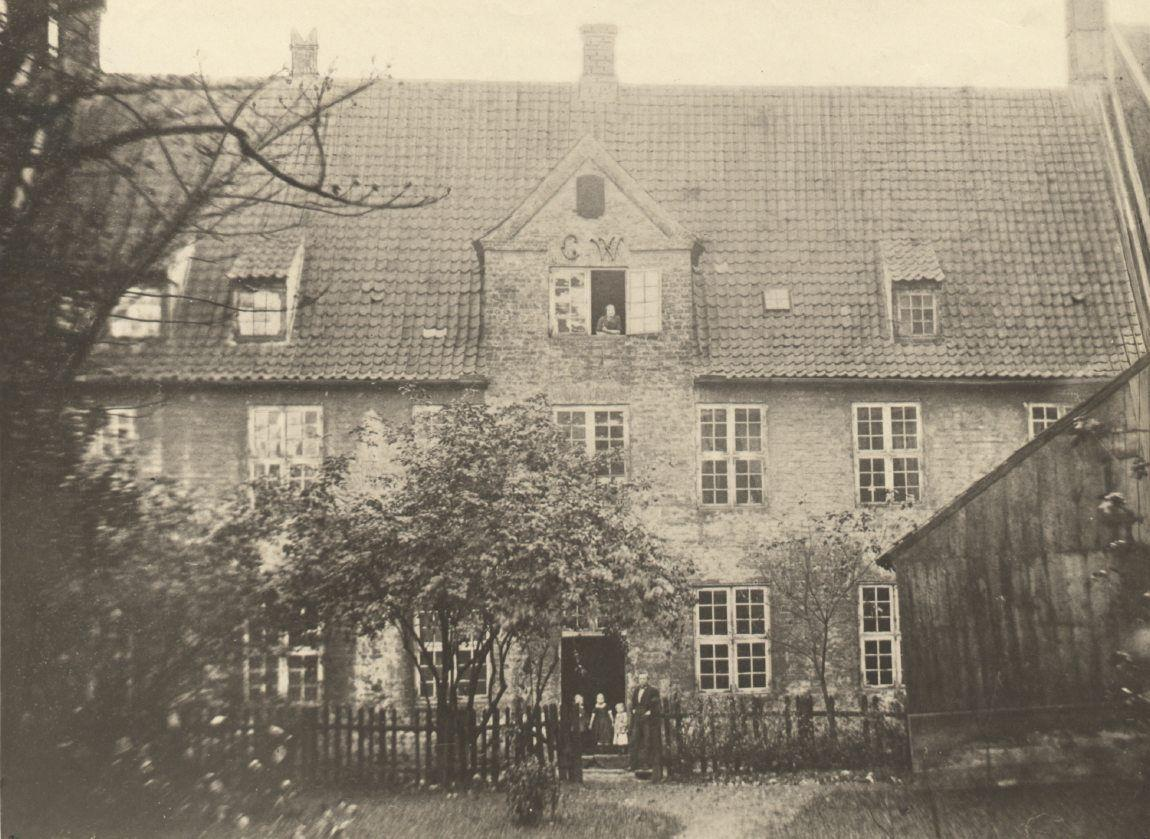
Valkendorfs Kollegium in 1864

The old building which never fully recovered from the fire was eventually torn down and a new building (which is still in use) was made and taken into use in 1866. Valkendorfs Kollegium is one of the oldest dormitories of the University of Copenhagen.

== Residents ==
Several celebrities have been alumni of the dormitories through time. Among the best known include

- Jesper Als
- Peder Kofod Ancher
- Hans Bagger
- Herman Bang
- Steen Steensen Blicher
- Peder Knudsen Blichert
- Iver Brinck
- Rudolph Buchhave
- Ole Nicolai Bützow
- Peder Christensen
- Frederik Dreier
- Johannes Ewald
- Christian Fleischer
- N.F.S. Grundtvig
- Viktor Kristian Hjort
- Peder Holm
- Wille Høyberg
- B.S. Ingemann
- Frode Jakobsen
- Søren Poulsen Judichær
- Jørgen Jørgensen
- Peder Kylling
- Otto Diderik Lütken
- Oluf Münster
- Jens Møller
- Jens Bertel Møller
- Balthasar Gebhard von Obelitz
- Peder Blicher Olsen
- Johan Paludan
- Christen Friis Rottbøll
- Henrik Jansøn Samuel
- F.C. Sibbern
- Benjamin Georg Sporon
- Henrik Stampe
- Frands Thestrup
- P.K. Thorsen
- Erasmus Georg Fog Thune
- Frants Vilhelm Trojel
- Sophus Zahle
- William Christopher Zeise
