= Volmars Drosted =

Danish architect

Volmars Drosted (23 April 1890 – 26 November 1956), was a Danish architect, born in Frederiksberg. He worked on a number of public buildings for the city of Helsingør as well as the thorough restoration of the famous Marienlyst Castle in 1953.

== Career ==
Completed Technical School in Copenhagen, the Art Academy (Kunstakademiet) in 1920. He was a member of the Artists Society (Kunstnersamfundet) and employee of Architect Paul Baumann and Professor Hack Kampmann as well as advisory architect for Helsingør municipality from 1929 and for St. Olai Church from 1935. He was architect of the social housing in Helsingør from 1938. Chairman of the Architects Association of Denmark for Østifterne; Member of the Board of Architects Association.

He restored the late-medieval Købmandsgaard Stengade, and Dommergaard (Justice Building), 1932–36; Helsingør Kirke-gaard 1934–35; Øresunds Hospital in Helsingør (listed 1796), North and South wing, 1934–35; expanded Helsingør City Hall, 1942–43; and completed the thorough restoration of the famous Marienlyst Castle in 1953.

== Sources ==
=== Books ===
Kraks Blå Bog: Register 1910–1988 (in Danish). Copenhagen: Krak Forlag. 1988. p. 30.

=== Online ===
"Drosted, Volmars" (in Danish). Denmark: rosekamp.dk. 2009.
