= Christoffer Valkendorff =

Danish-Norwegian statesman and landowner

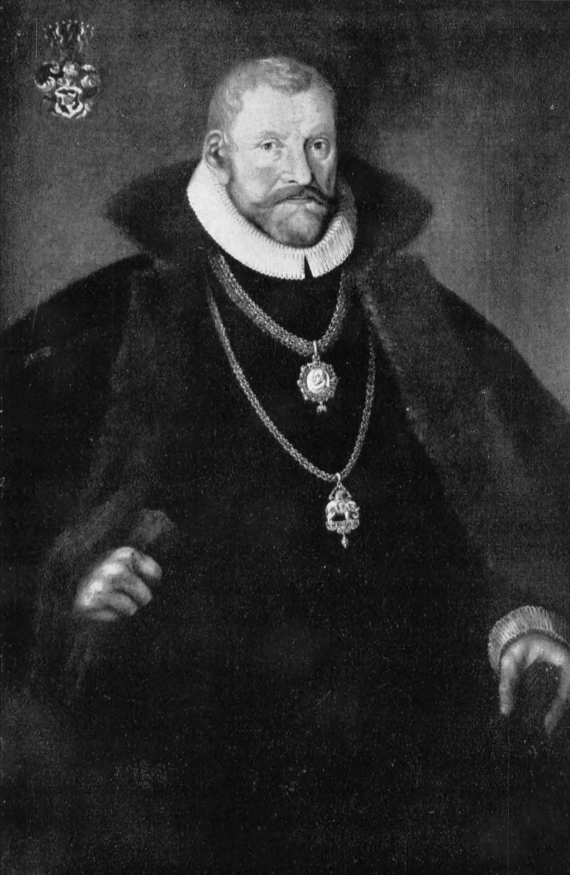

Steward of the Realm
- In office 1596–1601
- Preceded by: Peder Oxe
- Succeeded by: Frands Rantzau

Personal details
- Born: 1 September 1525 Glorup, Funen, Denmark-Norway
- Died: 17 January 1601 (aged 75) Copenhagen, Denmark-Norway
- Awards: Order of the Elephant

Christoffer Valkendorff (1 September 1525 – 17 January 1601) was a Danish-Norwegian statesman and landowner. His early years in the service of Frederick II brought him both to Norway, Ösel and Livland. He later served both as Treasurer and Stadtholder of Copenhagen and finally as Steward of the Realm from 1596 to 1601. He owned Glorup Manor on Funen from 1535 to 1601, whose current main building he constructed, although it has later been adapted in the Neoclassical style. He constructed the old Town Hall in Bergen, and he also constructed Svindinge Church, on Funen, one of the best preserved Renaissance style churches in Denmark. He founded the dormitory Valkendorfs Kollegium in Copenhagen where the street Valkendorfsgade is named after him.

== Early life and education ==
Valkendorff was born into the wealthy Valkendorff family on 1 September 1525 at Glorup Manor, the son of privy councillor Henning Valkendorff by his second wife Sidsel (Cecilie) Jørgens-datter Friis. His father died in 1535. He received a thorough education in his mother's house.

== Career ==
=== Service in Norway ===
Valkendorff is mentioned in 1553 as king Christian III of Denmark-Norway`s secretary and was rewarded with the 1554 Fief of Bergen for life. In 1556 he was also granted the fief of Vardøhus. He warned the government of Copenhagen about the threat against Danish economic interests that resulted from the British opening of a trade route north of Norway to Russia, avoiding the payment of Sound Dues at Helsingør. He was also successful in opposing the last remains of Hanseatic influence, which earned him the benevolence of King Frederick II. He also worked as a squire and local official. He confiscated illegally collected taxes and made the German clergy respect the ordinance and Bergen's superintendent. Mogens Gyldenstierne supported his initiatives.

The Hanseatic League complained to the new king, Frederick II, about Valkendorff. The need for support from Lübeck in an awakening conflict with Sweden made the king appoint a new fier of Bergen, called Valkendorff home to Copenhagen and open an investigation of his governance. Valkendorff was outraged and a further conflict with the king over land interests on Funen sent him off to Saxony in exile.

=== Seven Year War ===
Augustus, Elector of Saxony mediated between Valkendorff and the king and in 1561 he was entrusted with the important task of escorting Dake Magnus to Ösel. On 1 October 1563, during the Seven Year War, Valkendorff was appointed to stadtholder of Livland alongside H. v. Lüdinghausen (Wulff).

=== Gotland, Roskildegaard and Salling ===
Valkendorff was called home to Copenhagen in 1567. He lost the fief of Iceland in 1570 and was instead granted the fief of Gotland in August 1571. The situation on Gotland was chaotic but Valnendorf managed to restore peace on the island in just two years. He then held the field of Roskildegaard in 1573-74 and was then granted Salling with freedom from taxes until 1580.

=== Service in Copenhagen ===
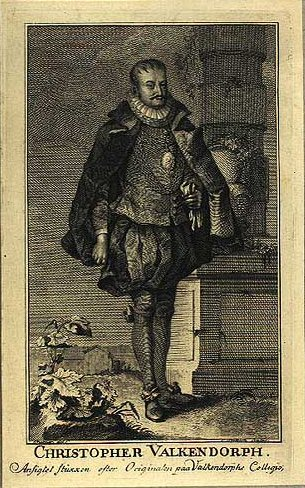
Christoffer Valkendorff

Valkendorff's years as a journeyman ended when he was appointed to treasurer (rentemester) in 1564. He handled the office with great efficiency and managed to reduce national debts. He was also appointed to stadtholder of Copenhagen. When Peder Oxe died in October 1575, the king initially failed to appoint a new Steward of the Realm but Valkendorff was put in charge of Bremerholm and the Navy. In 1576, a reluctant Frederick II appointed him to Councillor of the Realm.

After the death of Frederick II in 1588, Valkendorff assumed control of the guardianship of Christian IV. As "rent master" he delivered the dowry of 75,000 Danish dalers to James VI of Scotland, who had married Anne of Denmark in 1589. Valkendorff argued with Peder Munk about defects in the fleet that had prevented Anne of Denmark sailing to Scotland in September 1589. In the summer of 1590 the adverse weather and technical problems were blamed on witchcraft. Several women, including Anna Koldings, were accused and executed during the Copenhagen witch trials.

His powerful position led to his downfall. In 1590 he had to vacate all his offices after accusations of abuse of power and the judicial murder of Magnus Heinason. Though not quite unjustified these accusations were probably mostly politically motivated.

For some years Valkendorff kept in the background but gradually he regained his influence and at the accession to power of the young Christian IV in 1596 he was at last appointed Steward of the Realm, a post he kept until his death. During these last years of power he still showed himself energetic but somewhat more cautious.

== Personal life ==
Valkendorf never married and left no children. He owned Glorup Manor from 1535, although he initially seem to have shared the ownership of some of the land with his siblings. He expanded the estate significantly over the years through the acquisition of more land. I'm the 1570s. he constructed Svindinge Church, now considered to be one of the best preserved Renaissance style churches in Denmark. After completing the church, he also constructed Glorup's current main building.

He supported the university in Copenhagen economically and founded the dormitory Valkendorfs Kollegium 26 February 1589.

He died in on 17 1601 and was buried in the graveyard of the Church of Our Lady. Glorup Manor was passed on to his younger brother, Erik Valkendorf, who died in 1605.
