= Nicolas-Henri Jardin =

French architect

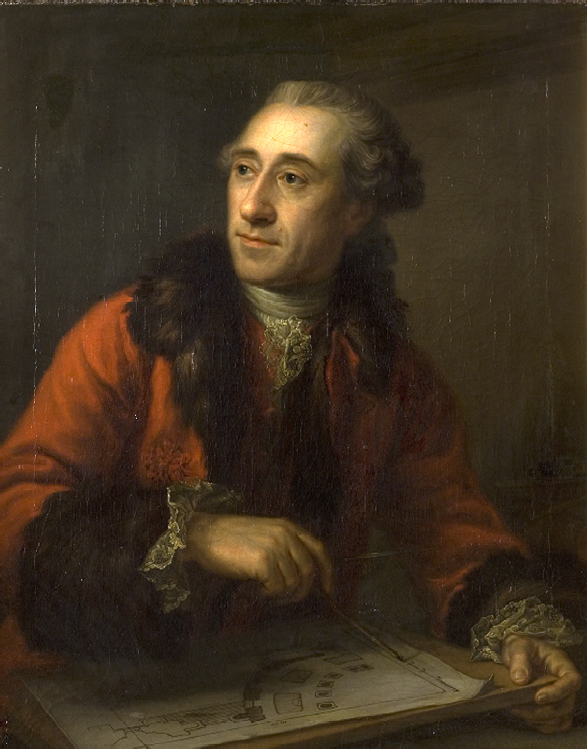
- Nicolas-Henri Jardin, by Peder Als in 1764
- Born: March 22, 1720; St. Germain des Noyers
- Died: August 31, 1799 (aged 79); St. Germain des Noyers

Nicolas-Henri Jardin (22 March 1720 – 31 August 1799) was a French architect. Born in St. Germain des Noyers, Seine-et-Marne, Jardin worked seventeen years in Denmark–Norway as an architect to the Danish royal court. He introduced neoclassicism to Denmark–Norway.

== Early training and student tour to Italy ==
According to Jardin's own statement he began his architectural studies at the age of ten. It is confirmed by independent source that he started his training at the French Academy of Architecture (Académie royale d'architecture) no later than in 1738, perhaps before. He studied under A.C. Mollet, and won the grand prize (Prix de Rome) for architecture at 22 years of age for his design of a choir or chancel in a cathedral.

The prize won him a travel stipend, which he used to travel to Italy in 1744. There he studied at the French Academy in Rome 1744-1748, while living at the Academy's pension. At the same time he studied mathematics and geometry with Jesuit priest and physicist Ruggero Joseph Boscovich, and graphics presumably with Giuseppe Vasi. He may also have studied engineering while in Rome.

In Italy he was friends with fellow countryman, sculptor Jacques François Joseph Saly who was also on student tour at the time. Saly would play an important role in his future only a few years later. They were both influenced by contemporary Giovanni Battista Piranesi, and the current infatuation with Roman ruins that were seen as a reminder of a common European past, and could be the inspiration for a new universal design style.

He was resident architect with Michel Tannevot in Paris 1753-1754.

== Iconography ==
- A painting by Jean Barbault showing Jardin as Ambassador of Persia, Beauvais, Musée départemental de l'Oise, for the Masacarade of 1748.

== Royal invitation to work in Denmark ==
His friend and countryman, sculptor Jacques François Joseph Saly who had been summoned to work in Denmark in 1752 for the royal court, brought Jardin to the attention of King Frederik V as the suitable choice to replace Nicolai Eigtved for the design and building of Frederik's Church (Frederikskirke), now known as The Marble Church (Marmorkirken), work on which had begun in 1749. A contract to bring Jardin to Denmark was concluded on 12 October 1754, a few months after Eigtved's death, and included a considerable annual wage for both him and his young, inexperienced brother Louis Henri Jardin.

The brothers came to Copenhagen that same autumn, and they both were named members of the Royal Danish Academy of Art (Det Kongelige Danske Kunstakademi) on 15 January 1755. They were also named professors at the school of the Academy, where story goes, on account of their inability to speak Danish, they held lectures in French to an audience of students that didn't understand them. This was, however, not unusual at the time, as many of the Academy's teachers were foreigners, especially French, including its director, friend Jacques Saly. Nicolas-Henri was professor in architecture, and his brother was professor in perspective from 1755.

== Frederik’s Church and other assignments ==
On 1 April 1756 Jardin took over project leadership on Frederik's Church. His first set of building drawings were different from anything one had previously seen in Denmark, and anticipated the later styles of Claude Nicolas Ledoux and Étienne-Louis Boullée. The plans, however, were rejected on account of the exorbitant expense required to carry them out.

He presented a new set of drawings at Fredensborg Palace summer 1756, which the King accepted, in spite of the Royal Building Commission's opinion that these plans also were too expensive. The King committed funds to the project, although full funding was never realised.

The plans were monumental, and work went slowly. In 1760 after predecessor Lauritz de Thurah’s death, Nicolas-Henri was named Royal Building Master with responsibility over all royal castles and buildings, as well as parks in Denmark, a position he held until 1770.

He also took over the interior decoration (1756-1759) of powerful statesman and leader Court Marshal (Hofmarskal) Adam Gottlob Moltke’s palace, the Moltke Palace, today known as Christian VII’s Palace, at Amalienborg, after Nicolai Eigtved died in 1754.

His younger brother died at Charlottenborg 1759 at the age of 29. Nicolas-Henri overtook his teaching position.

Prior to 1760 he became an honorary member of the academies in Florence and Bologna.

In 1759 he began work on Bernstorff Palace near Gentofte (1759–1765) and Lundehave, now known as Marienlyst Castle in Helsingør (1758–1762). The work on the garden at Bernstorff Palace, done in cooperation with Joachim Wasserschlebe, took until 1768 to complete.

In 1762 he became a corresponding member of the French Academy of Art in Paris. 1762–1763 he traveled to France.

In 1764 Frederick’s Church stood only 9.4 meters above the foundation.

In 1765 he published a large folio of copperplate etchings called "Plans, coupés et elevations de l'église royale de Frédéric V".

== A change in the royal chambers ==
King Frederik V, his loyal supporter, died on 14 January 1766 and the young, unstable Christian VII became king. 1768-1769 he traveled to France, England, Holland and Belgium, partly in the company of Johannes Wiedewelt. Prior to 1769 he became an honorary member of the Academy in Marseille. In 1769 he received the Order of Saint Michael in France.

In 1770 it was estimated that, at the then current rate of building activity, the Frederik's Church exterior would not be complete until 1797, and the interior would take a further 50 years to complete. Due to Johann Friedrich Struensee’s cost-cutting measures, a royal resolution was made on 9 November 1770 that building activity would be stopped for a period of time. Scaffolding, machines and material were sold at public auction, and Jardin was relieved of his duty as Church Building Master with severance pay.

== Departure from Denmark, return to France ==
Struensee fell from power at the beginning of 1771, and the country's general mood turned against all foreigners in positions of power. Jardin resigned his professorship at the Academy on 26 March 1771 and left Denmark. His students at the Academy had included Caspar Frederik Harsdorff, Georg Erdmann Rosenberg, Christian Josef Zuber, and Hans Næss.

His friend and Director of the Academy for over 17 years, Jacques Saly, resigned from his post three months later. Jardin was named an extraordinary member of the Academy in 1772.

On 23 December 1771 he became a member of the French Academy of Art in Paris. On 11 May 1778 he was named Royal Architect by King Louis XV. On 10 March 1792 he became a member first class of the French Academy of Art in Paris.

During the French Revolution’s Reign of Terror (1793-1794) Jardin retired to his home town. He died in 1799.

While new plans were again proposed to continue work on Frederik's Church by Caspar Frederik Harsdorff in 1795, no actual construction would begin until Ferdinand Meldahl took over the reins of leadership in 1874.

== Selected works ==
- Yellow Mansion, Amaliegade, Copenhagen (1764-1767)
- Interior work at Christiansborg Palace (1761-1767), especially decoration of the Great Hall (1765-1766), which burned down in the fire of 1794.
- Redesign of Fredensborg Palace Garden and Park (1759-1766), along with Johannes Wiedewelt.
- Redesign of summer residence at Bernstorff Palace (1759-1765) for Foreign Minister Johann Hartwig Ernst, Count von Bernstorff. Gardens at Bernstorff Palace, completed 1768
- Redesign of Marienlyst Castle for Count Adam Gottlob Moltke (1759-1763)
- Interior work at Bregentved for Count Adam Gottlob Moltke (1762-1764)
- Rebuilding of Count Moltke's Glorup Estate on Funen (1763-1765)
