= Glorup =

Manor house in Funen, Denmark

Coordinates: 55°12′22″N 10°42′28″E

Glorup Manor
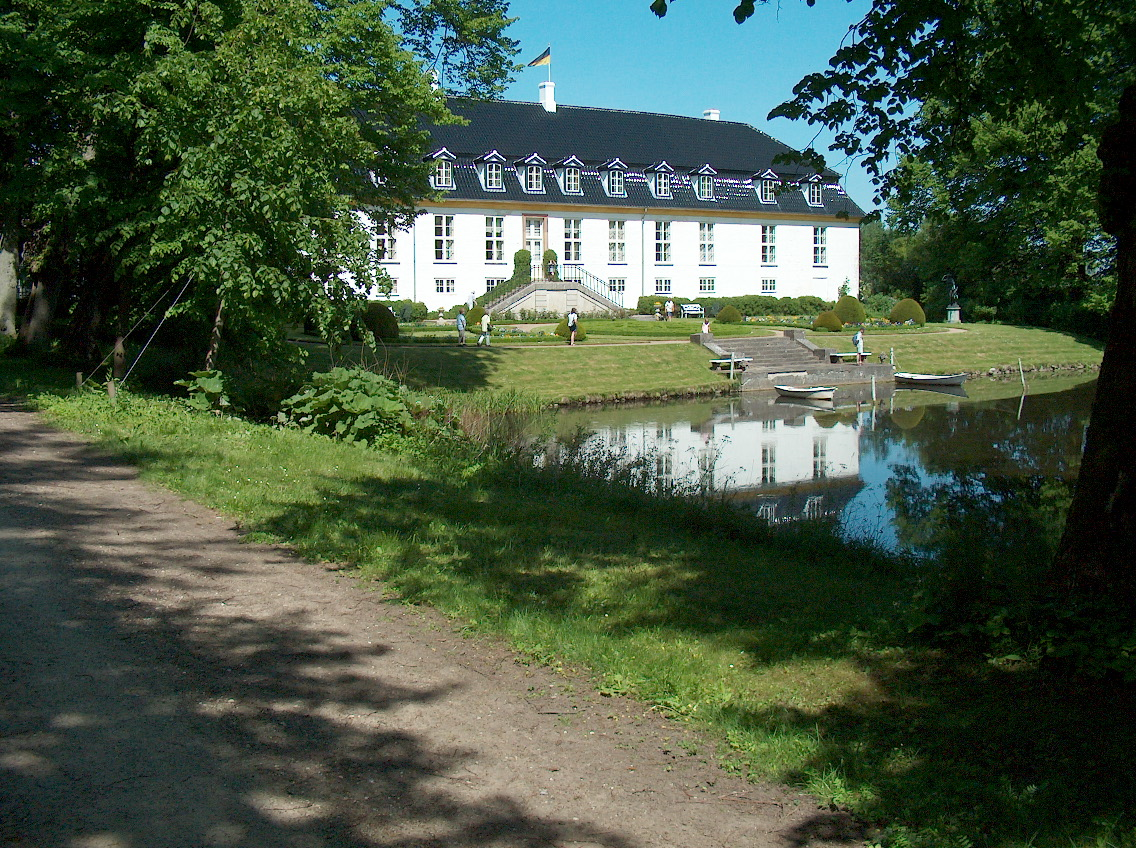
- Interactive map of the Glorup Manor area

General information
- Architectural style: Baroque, Romantic garden
- Location: Near Nyborg, Funen, Denmark
- Construction started: 1762 (1742-43; fl. 1599)
- Completed: 1765; 261 years ago
- Client: Adam Gottlob Moltke (Christian Ludvig Scheel-Plessen)

Technical details
- Structural system: Masonry on granite plinth

Design and construction
- Architects: Nicolas-Henri Jardin (Philip de Lange)

Glorup is a manor house located between Nyborg and Svendborg in the south-east of the Danish island Funen. Rebuilt to the design of Nicolas-Henri Jardin and his pupil Christian Josef Zuber in 1763–65, it is considered one of the finest Baroque complexes in Denmark and was included in the 2006 Danish Culture Canon.

== History ==
=== Early history ===
Glorup is first mentioned in 1390, but nothing is known about the building at that time and the name may refer to a village rather than a building.

The first reliable documentation of Glorup is from the Renaissance, when Christoffer Valkendorff built a four-winged house in two storeys with four towers, surrounded by a moat. It was an impressive building for its time but only the foundation with the cellar and a sandstone tablet with a horse and the Valkendorf coat of arms are left of this house. Nowadays the tablet is placed over a door in the old riding-house.

Glorup was owned by the Walkendorff family from 1400 to 1661, when they were forced to sell the estate following the destructions of the Northern Wars. Glorup was then owned by the Ahlefeldt family from 1661 to 1711 before coming into the possession of the Plessen family in 1711.

=== Redesigning the house ===
In 1723, Privy Councillor (Danish: Gehejmeråd) Christian Ludvig Scheel-Plessen inherited Glorup and, from 1743 to 1744, rebuilt the house with the assistance of architect Philip de Lange. One storey disappeared and a Mansard roof was put on all four wings. The house was plastered and whitewashed. The prevalent architectural style of the time was Baroque.

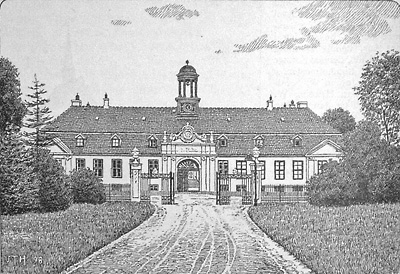
Drawing of the house from 1898

After the death of Scheel-Plessen in 1762, Glorup was purchased by Count Adam Gottlob Moltke of Bregentved, who at the same time bought Rygaard, the neighbouring manor, for 120,000 rigsdaler. The cost was partly covered by a prize of 60,000 which he had won on the lottery together with the dowry he received from his second wife. Moltke, a prominent and skillful farmer, put the manor on its feet again, helped by the rising prices of agricultural products in Europe. Count Moltke was very pleased with his new acquisition, but the house already looked old-fashioned. He therefore decided to have it modernized, commissioning Denmark's foremost architect, Nicolas-Henri Jardin, who had just assisted him at Marienlyst Palace, and his architectural designer Christian Josef Zuber.

=== Expansions of the park ===
Until Moltke acquired Glorup, there was only a fairly small garden in front of the south wing of Glorup. He laid out a bigger English garden south-west of the castle. It was also Moltke who planted the tree-lined avenues.

When the home farm was moved in the 1860s, it left room for greater gardens. They were laid out between 1862 and 1875 by landscape architect Henrik August Flindt, with the head gardener Ditlev Christian Ernst Eltzholtz (1838–1928) in charge of the work on site. Eltzholtz learned his gardening skills from his father Johan Christoffer Eltzholtz (1801–1883) who was head gardener at Brahetrolleborg located on Funen (Fyn), Denmark. On the island in the little lake, a fountain was built which sprays water from the mouths of lions. Among the new gardens was also a French garden by the lakeside with flowers and shrubs in formal ornamental patterns, and with two rows of statues depicting Greek and Roman gods and goddesses. Each year 100.000 plants were bedded out from the greenhouses.

== Architecture ==
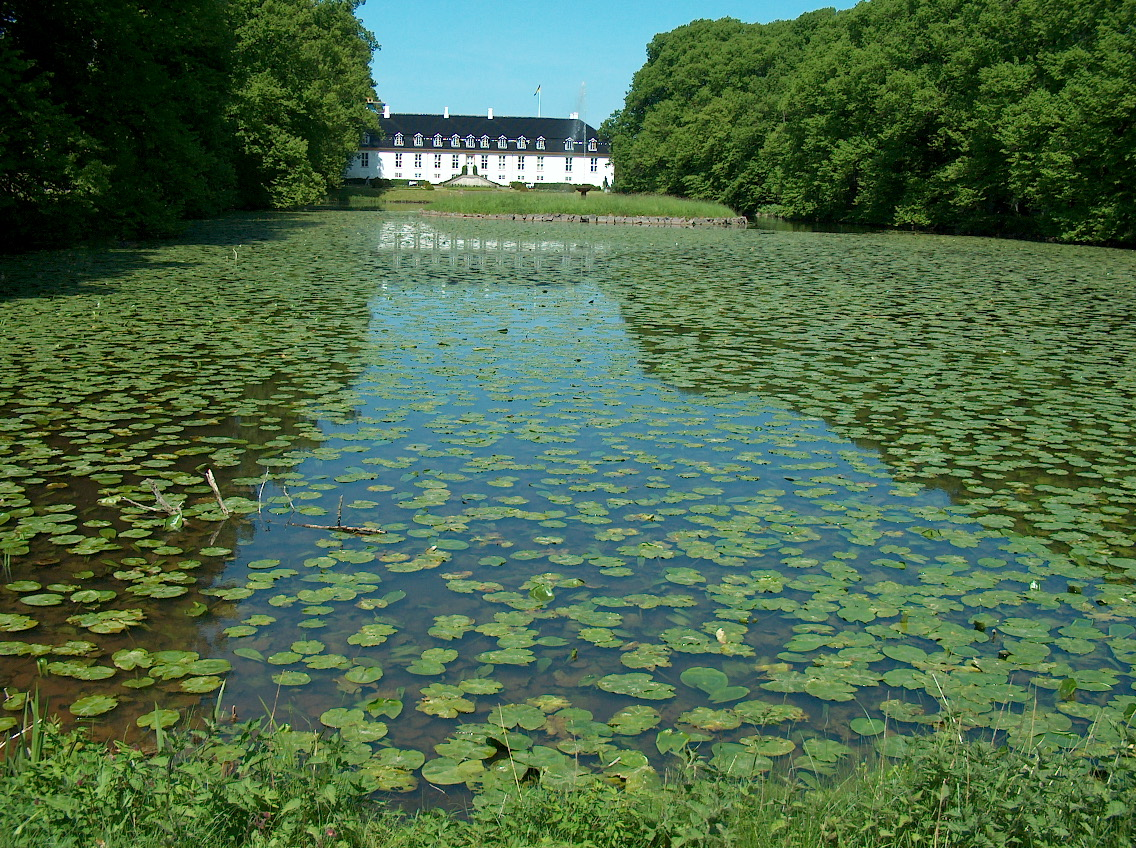
The house viewed at a distance

Glorup Manor consists of four low white-washed wings with window frames, cornices and pilasters partly painted yellow. It is topped with a large Mansard roof in glazed black tile. The flèche on the roof was added from 1773 to 1775.

A broad flight of steps leads up to the main entrance, and there are similar steps on the north and south sides of the house. The inside contains a series of elegant rooms, especially the dining hall decorated in gold and white and the entrance hall with its double staircase.

The chapel from 1898 is built in Neo-Gothic style. It has a Catholic interior and a sepulchral chapel.

== Park ==
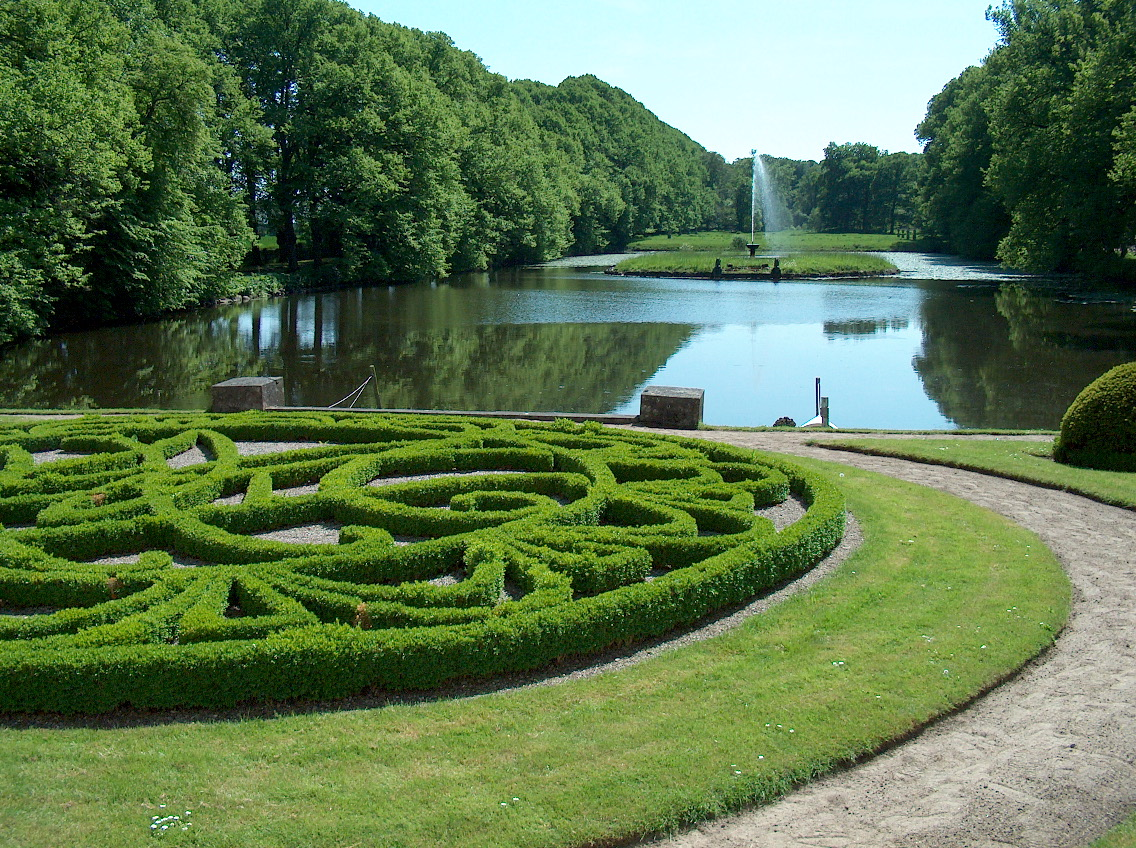
The garden and lake

Glorup Manor is situated in undulating countryside with many lakes and marshes. The park has two sections, a formal French Baroque garden and an Anglo-Chinese landscape garden. They are bounded by long, almost parallel avenues of lime tree, projecting out into the surroundings. Founded in the middle of the 18th century, the Anglo-Chinese garden is one of the earliest Romantic garden complexes in the country. Oaks and fruit trees are to be found in the park as well as exotic varieties such as giant sequoias, ginkgos and a tulip tree. The winding paths connect pavilions, statues, vases and a mirror pond.

=== Obelisk ===
An obelisk in the park commemorates a family reunion at Glorup in 1778. Tablets note the names and titles of the 32 family members present on that occasion. The memorial was designed by the royal sculptor, Johannes Wiedewelt. An inscription reveals the hostess's wish to see her family live forever in the abodes of the blessed.

=== Folly ===
The park also contains a folly from 1868, built in the shape of a small temple with six Doric columns. It houses Johannes Wiedewelt's Andromeda from 1764. The statue was originally placed in Moltke's mansion in Copenhagen, now part of Amalienborg Palace. It depicts Andromeda who, as divine punishment for her mother's bragging, was chained to a rock as a sacrifice to a sea monster.

=== Bridge ruin ===
Another romantic feature, located not far from the temple, was a suspension-bridge spanning a ravine. Built in 1867, the bridge was 138 feet long. Today only the towers remains.

=== Inscribed stone ===
On the small island there is a stone with a contradictory inscription in French which reads: "La nudité de ce monument sans Epitaphe et sans Inscription dit aux âmes sensible et honnêtes tout ce qu'il est possible de dire" (English: "The nakedness of this monument without epitaph and without inscription tells sensitive and honest souls everything there is to say.").

== Today ==
The Moltke family, since 1843 as Moltke-Huitfeldt, still owns Glorup and Rygaard. The building today stands mostly as it was in 1765. The home farm was moved away from the main building in 1860. The park has public access.

The Glorup Estate with Rygaard Manor extends over 1,132 hectares (2,800 acres).

== List of owners ==
- (1390) Povl Nielsen
- (1479-1483) Axel Valkendorf
- (1483- ) Anne Andersdatter Passau, gift Valkendorf
- (1483- ) Niels Valkendorf
- (1483-1535) Henning Valkendorf
- (1535- ) Sidsel Jørgensdatter Friis, gift Valkendorf
- (1535-1565) Jacob Valkendorf
- (1535-1585) Erik Valkendorf
- (1535-1601) Christoffer Valkendorf
- (1601-1605) Erik Valkendorf
- (1605-1626) Henning Valkendorf
- (1626-1658) Henning Valkendorf
- (1658-1661) Margrethe Blome, gift Valkendorf
- (1661) Henning Powisch
- (1661-1694) Hans Ahlefeldt
- (1694-1695) Christian Ahlefeldt
- (1695-1711) Anna von Rumohr, gift von Ahlefeldt
- (1711-1712) Christian Siegfried von Plessen
- (1712-1752) Christian Ludvig von Plessen
- (1752-1754) Christian Sigfred von Plessen
- (1754-1757) Frederik Christian Otto Wedel-Jarlsberg
- (1757-1762) Hans Riegelsen
- (1762-1793) Adam Gottlob Moltke
- (1793) Sophie Hedvig Raben, gift Moltke
- (1793-1851) Gebhard Moltke
- (1851-1876) Adam Gottlob Moltke-Huitfeldt
- (1876-1896) Gebhard Léon Moltke-Huitfeldt
- (1896-1902) Marie Seebach, gift Moltke-Huitfeldt
- (1902-1944) Adam Gottlob Carl Moltke-Huitfeldt
- (1944-1965) Léon Charles Joseph Moltke-Huitfeldt
- (1965-2004) Alice Marie Louise Moltke-Huitfeldt, gift Rosenkrantz
- (2004- ) Jacob Arild Moltke-Huitfeldt Rosenkrantz
