= Korsbrødregården =

Building in Nyborg Municipality, Denmark

Coordinates: 55.3112948°N 10.7926695°E

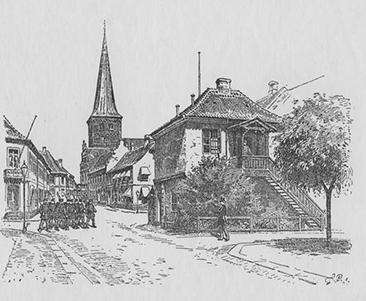
The stepped gables in front of the steeple of Vor Frue Kirke are parts of Korsbrødregården. (19th century)

Korsbrødregården is the ancient compound of the Knights Hospitaller in the Danish city of Nyborg, founded as a dependency of their castle and hospital in Antvorskov. It is situated south of Vor Frue Kirke (Our Lady's CHurch) just across the small street named Korsbrødregade. The Brick Gothic building has been erected at about 1400 and was first mentioned in 1405. It consists of two ailes. the northern one has a large vaulted cellar with two naves.

After 1613, the building was enlarged, and one of its stepped gables was changed for a Renaissance volute gable.

== Sources ==
- Nationalmuseet: Danmarks Kirker – Vor Frue Kirke, Nyborg (→ PDF „Vor Frue Kirke“: S. 859–868 Korsbrødegården)
