= Swedification of Scania =

Swedish influence

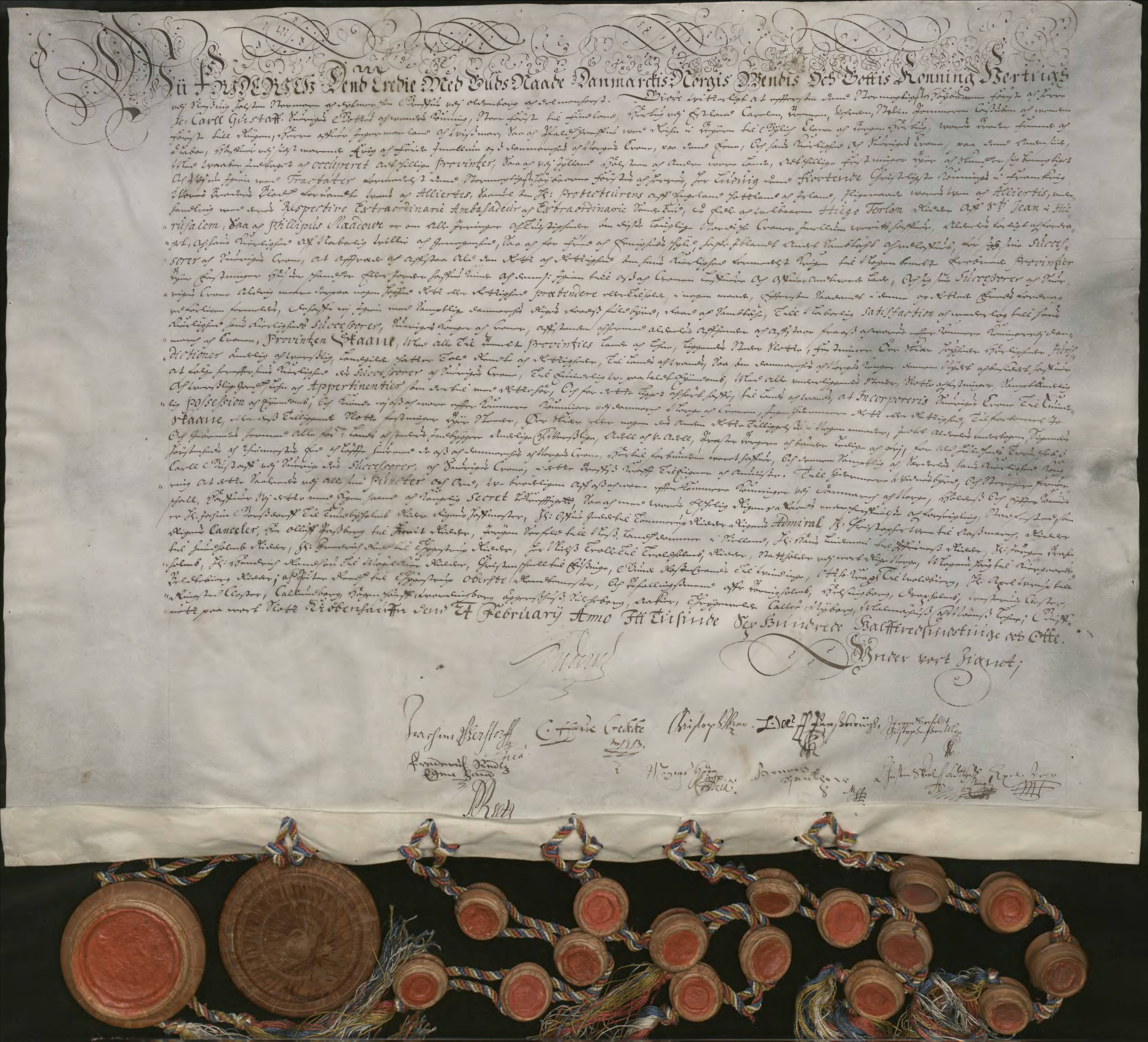
The Danish cession document, 1658.

The Swedification of Scania refers to the process in which the former Danish province of Scania (Skåne) was culturally and linguistically integrated and made into a part of Sweden, in the context of 17th century Swedish expansion within Scandinavia. Today, more than 300 years later, Scania is the southernmost part of Sweden.

== Background ==
As part of the Treaty of Roskilde at the end of the Second Northern War, all areas in the historical region of Skåneland were ceded by Denmark-Norway to Sweden in early 1658. For the Swedish Empire, it was important to integrate these new subjects and to make the Scanians identify with Swedish culture and language, rather than Danish. On 16 April 1658, representatives of Scania, Blekinge and Halland's nobility, citizens, clergy and peasants gathered in Malmö to swear fealty to Charles X Gustav. The king was not present but was represented by an empty chair surrounded by Swedish soldiers.

In 1662, Sweden aligned taxes and regulations in Scania with other parts of Sweden. Some of the new rules were very different from previous Danish practice; for example, the lilla tullen ("the small customs"), which charged a tax for all goods brought into cities. Other changes required each city council to have least two Swedish-born members. At the same time, inhabitants of Scania received representation in the Riksdag, unlike other areas that had been conquered by the Swedish Empire.

When Charles X Gustav landed in Helsingborg in 1658, he met Bishop Peder Winstrup from Lund on the pier, who became a driving force for the establishment of the University of Lund as a Swedish counterweight to the University of Copenhagen. In 1666, the former was established under the name "Regia Academia Carolina", and its official opening ceremony took place in January 1668.

About two decades after the Treaty of Roskilde, Sweden sought to more fully integrate Scania, including enforcing changes to the church and local language. In 1681, local priests aligned with the Church of Sweden and court documents and ecclesiastical correspondence increasingly adopted more standard Swedish grammatical features.

During the Scanian War in the late 1670s, pro-Danish Snapphane fighters aided the Danish invasion. This led to a campaign to capture, torture and execute those who would not swear allegiance to the Swedish king. The policy was effective and by 1709 when Denmark again moved to invade Scania after the Battle of Poltava local militias resisted the effort.

When the Scanian War began in 1675, some 180,000 people lived in Scania. By 1718, only 132,800 were left. Some snapphane fled to Denmark; some 30,000 Scanian boys were sent to the Swedish army, many of whom were relocated to the Baltics. At the same time, Swedes were encouraged to take over Scanian farms and marry Scanian women.
