= Hotel Marienlyst =

Hotel in Helsingør, Denmark

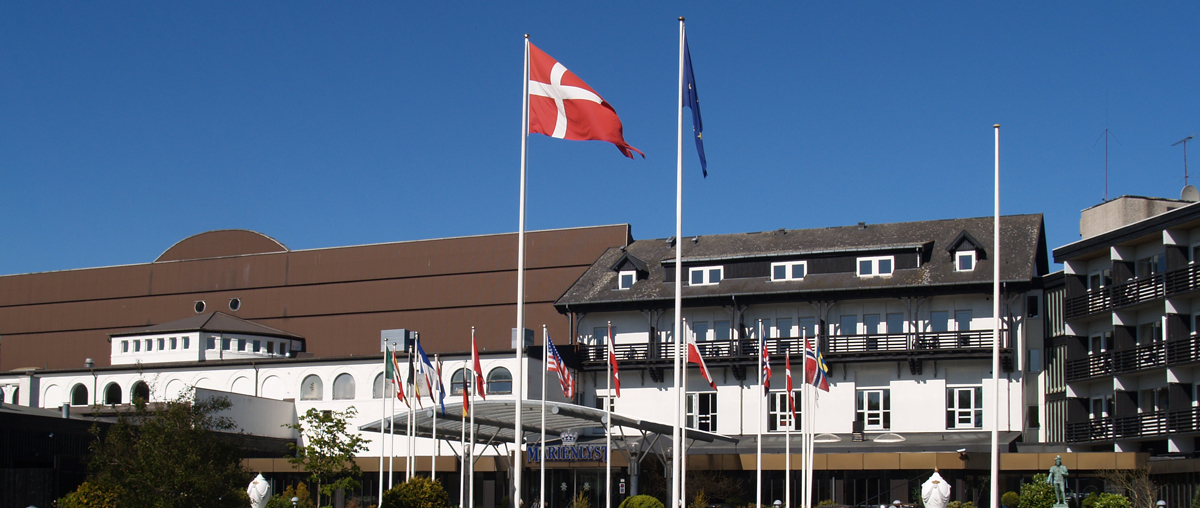
- Interactive map of the Hotel Marienlyst area

General information
- Location: Nordre Strandvej, Helsingør, Denmark
- Coordinates: 56.0452°N 12.6037°E
- Opening: 1859
- Owner: Midstar Hotels
- Operator: ESS Group

Other information
- Number of rooms: 225

Website
- Official website

Hotel Marienlyst is a seaside hotel located just north of Kronborg Castle in Helsingør, Denmark. It takes its name after Marienlyst House, a neighboring former royal summer retreat, which was part of it from its foundation in 1859 until 1896. Facilities include a restaurant, bar, wellness area and a casino. The Denmark national football team stays at the hotel in connection with home matches and training sessions.

== History ==
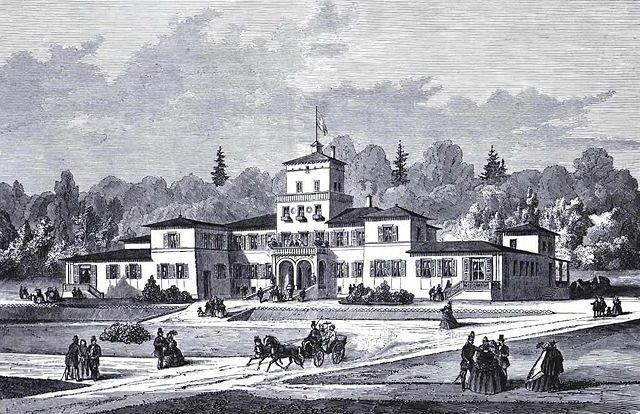
Marienlyst Spa Hotel in 1860, illustration from Illustreret Tidende

In the second half of the 19th century, the Øresund coast became a popular summer destination for wealthy citizens from Copenhagen. J. S. Nathanson, a broker from Helsingør, rented Marienlyst House from Helsingør Municipality with the intention of opening a spa hotel. His inspiration came from visits to spa towns in Germany. As a publicity stunt, to profit from nearby Kronborg Castle's reputation as the home of Hamlet, he renamed a natural spring in the cliff behind the house Ophelia's Spring and constructed Hamlet's Grave nearby. Marienlyst Spa (Marienlyst Kur- og Søbadeanstalt) opened on 1 June 1858. Nathansen also charged the architect Niels Peder Christian Holsøe with the design of a new hotel building but went bankrupt before it had been completed and the project was there taken over by Helsingør Municipality. The new hotel building was inaugurated on 22 June 1861 with J. W. Briggs as operator. When Sarah Benhard was in Copenhagen in the summer of 1880 to perform in Adrienne Lecouvreur at the Royal Theatre, she visited Hotel Marienlyst to see the Tomb of Hamlet and Ophelia's Spring.

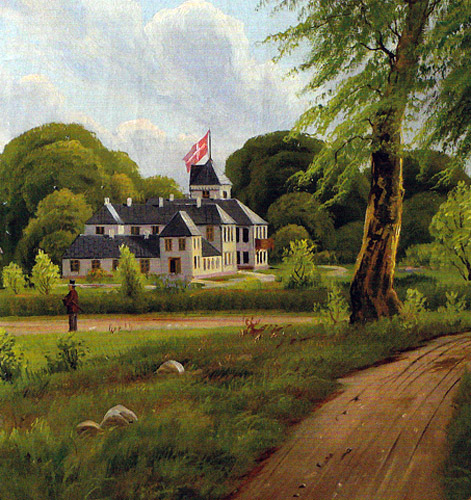
Hotel Marienlyst's original building seen on a detail from a painting from 1891

The hotel was acquired by a private consortium in 1883. The hotel was expanded with a new hotel and restaurant building as well as a building used for theatre and concerts. Rge spa hotel was frequented by both Danish and international high society. King Christian IV's brother, Prince Hans, stayed in the hotel's room 15 in the summer time several years in a row and the king visited it at several occasions. Alexander III of Russia visited it for lunch.

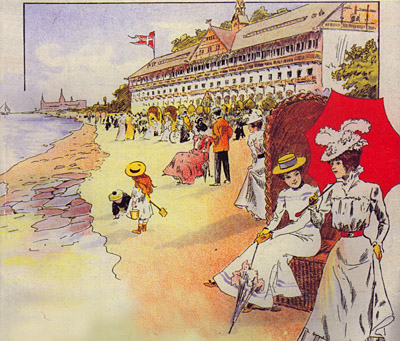
Old advertisement for Hotel Marienlyst

The connection between the hotel and the former royal residence ended in 1896. The spa hotel was acquired by master butcher Anders Jensen in 1897. He became alderman of the butchers' guild in Copenhagen in 1906 where he would expand his hotel business with the construction of Palace Hotel in 1908. In 1898, Jensen launched an invited architectural competition for the expansion of his new spa hotel. The competition was won by Richard Bergmanns and the extension was built in 1898-1900. A new residence was built in 1915 yp design by the architect Poul Holsøe.

The hotel was acquired by C.C. Klestrup in 1929. It was later purchased by Aage Stentoft and reopened after a comprehensive refurbishment on 12 May 1943. Stentoft had to flee the country due to his involvement with the resistance movement. Stig Lommer's Hornbæk Eevue used the theatre building in the summer of 1844. The German occupying forces confiscated the building in April 1945. After the liberation on 5 May, the hotel was used for housing German refugees until 1947.

The hotel went through several crises in the 1980s and 1990s. Since 2008, the Denmark national team has stayed at Hotel Marienlyst in connection with home matches and during training sessions. The hotel was damaged in the storm Bodil in 2013. It was acquired by an investor group led by Borris Tangaa Nielsen in 2014 and a plan for a comprehensive refurbishment and extension of the hotel was presented shortly thereafter. A new residential wing was inaugurated on New Year's Eve 2017. Artha, a private equity fund, acquired 49.9% of the hotel in August 2017. ESS Group acquired Hotel Marienlyst in 2019.

== Facilities ==
Hotel Marienlyst has 227 rooms, including suites. Facilities include two restaurants, two bars, a lounge, cafés, a shop, 19 conference rooms, a spa with a swimming pool, a yoga and wellness section, a beach sauna, and a sun terrace. Casino Marienlyst, the first to open in Denmark, is situated in the same building.
