= Marienlyst Castle =

Palace building in Helsingør, Denmark

Marienlyst Palace
- Marienlyst Slot
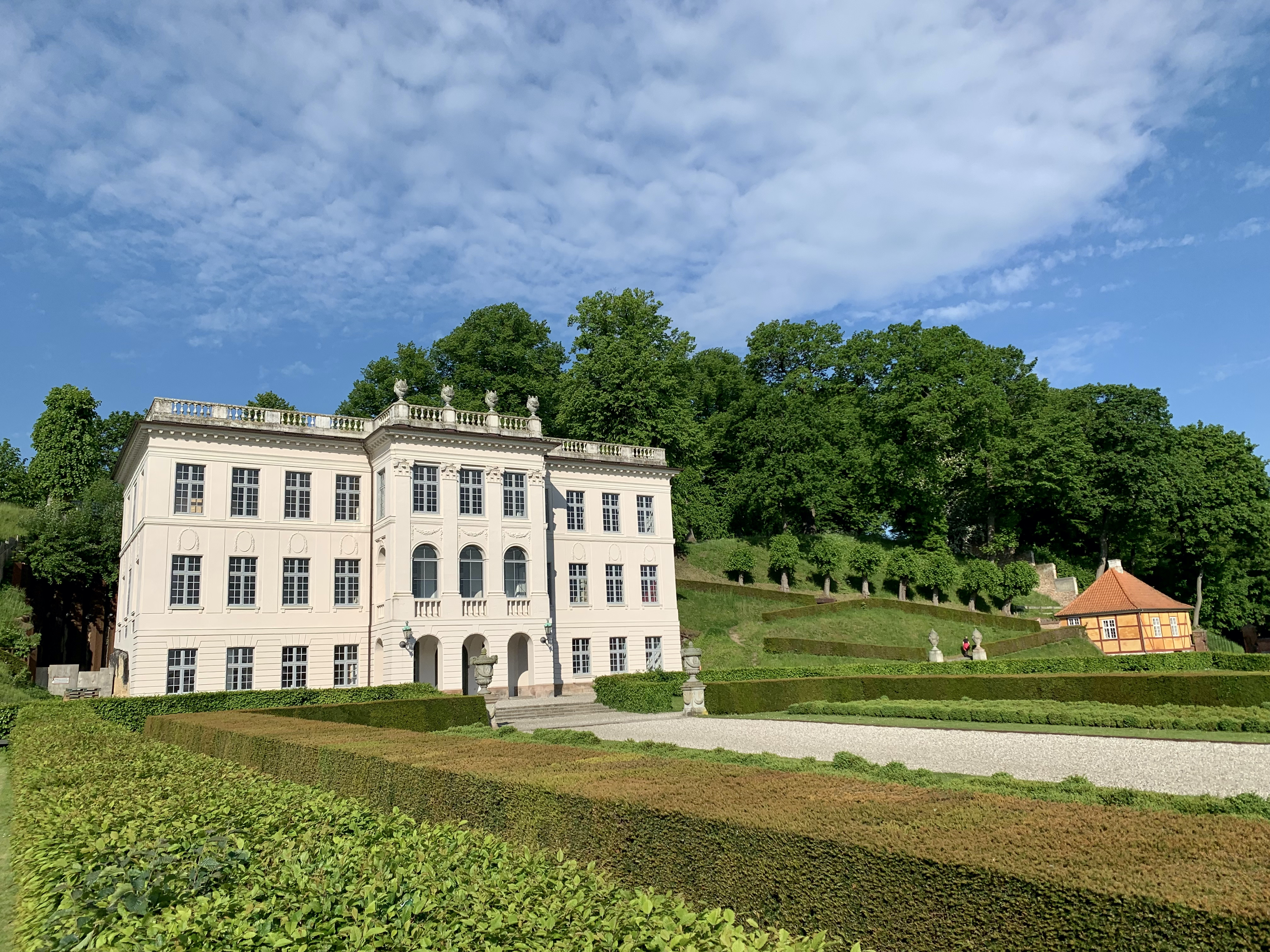
- Main façade of Marienlyst Castle
- Interactive map of the Marienlyst Palace area
- Former names: Lundhave Pavilion

General information
- Architectural style: Neoclassicism and Louis XVI
- Location: Marienlyst Allé 32, Helsingør, Denmark
- Coordinates: 56°2′31.2″N 12°36′7″E
- Construction started: 1587
- Completed: 1588
- Client: King Frederick II of Denmark
- Owner: Helsingør Municipality Museums

Design and construction
- Architects: Hans van Steenwinckel; Nicolas-Henri Jardin (current building)

Marienlyst Castle (Danish: Marienlyst Slot) is a palatial residence located in Helsingør, Denmark. It was named after King Frederik V of Denmark's second wife, Juliana Maria, the queen consort of Denmark and Norway. The building formerly served as a royal pavilion of Kronborg Castle and was mostly used as a venue for pleasure and hunting. It was also used by the director-general of the Øresund Custom House, Colonel Adam Gottlob von Krogh and his wife Magdalene, between 1796 and 1847.

Hans van Steenwinckel, the royal architect, designed and built the original pavilion and parterre garden in 1587, for King Frederick II of Denmark. The royal estate was then purchased in 1758 by Count Adam Gottlob Moltke, who completely changed the original pavilion and garden with the help of French architect Nicolas-Henri Jardin between 1759 and 1763. The additions led to its present-day architectural structure and façade. Jardin also redesigned the original parterre gardens, changing them to a larger, more modern garden à la française design, with symmetrical hedges, avenues, fountains and mirror ponds. Within the castle wall boundaries, these elegant garden grounds remain to a large extent intact, but outside, much of the garden has been lost, including the most renowned romantic landscape garden in Denmark, designed by Johan Ludvig Mansa in the 1790s. This was mostly due to the sale of much of the original property by the Helsingør municipality which had purchased the entire Marienlyst estate at auction in 1851. One of the lot purchasers was J.S. Nathanson, who in 1859 built Hotel Marienlyst, the first luxury hotel in Helsingør, named after the castle.

Between 1919 and 1921, local Helsingør gardener Gudmund Nyeland Brandt, removed the last remnants of the romantic gardens, replacing them with an 18th-century garden design to match the castle's classical architecture. For the most part it is these gardens visitors will see today. They have been part of Helsingør Municipality Museums since 1930.

== History ==
=== St Anne's Friary ===
In medieval times there was a chapel dedicated to Saint Anne in the area, which probably belonged to the Guild of St. Anna in Helsingør. In 1438 the chapel was given to a community of Franciscan friars which had been founded in 1419, who then converted the chapel into a friary also dedicated to Saint Anne, of which nothing remains except the street name, Sankt Anna Gade in Helsingør. The friary was confiscated by the crown during the Reformation of 1536 and was probably part of the royal property on the grounds, called Lundegaard, where an old stone house is known to have existed in 1576.

=== Frederick II's pavilion and garden ===
During the 1420s, King Eric of Pomerania created Kronborg Castle, the castle immortalized in Shakespeare's play, Hamlet. It was built like a strong fortress for guarding Øresund and ensuring payment of sound dues which were enforced by the immediate firing of all cannons on any ship that refused to pay. It was very effective and collected two thirds of crown revenues. By the late Renaissance, tastes had changed and Kronborg's high walls and bastions made it impossible to have a grand renaissance garden. An old monastery north of the yard was therefore chosen as the new location and named Lundhave after the royal estate.

In 1587, Hans van Steenwinckel the royal architect built a parterre garden and a pavilion for King Frederick II of Denmark. It was a three-story building, in the northern Italian renaissance style. The first floor had an armory, that also stored equipment for equestrian competitions, one of the so-called noble disciplines, which also included fencing and dance. This was taught to all nobles at the time through the knight academies. The second floor was where the queen consort, Sophie of Mecklenburg-Güstrow, had her rooms and the top floor was for the king. Sadly, he would only have a short time to enjoy his newly built pavilion and garden, as he died in 1588, barely a year after construction was completed. His son, King Christian IV of Denmark, would however get to use it throughout his reign, coming there often and spending large sums of money improving the garden and planting rare trees. He would also keep many pheasants and other game birds on the estate, for hunting.

=== Lundhave from the 1650s to 1750s ===
King Frederik III of Denmark took over the royal estate in 1648 after the death of his father and seems not to have been very interested in the pavilion but did have the new gardener simplify and restructure the grounds by planting a fruit and vegetable garden. Ten years later, the 1658 war with Sweden took its toll on the pavilion, but the garden did not suffer too much damage. It remained mostly unused until the end of Frederik III's reign in 1670. A depiction of the pavilion and gardens can be seen in Peder Resen's Atlas Danicus dated 1660 and published in 1677. In the drawings he calls the pavilion and garden, Kongenshafve (The King's Garden).

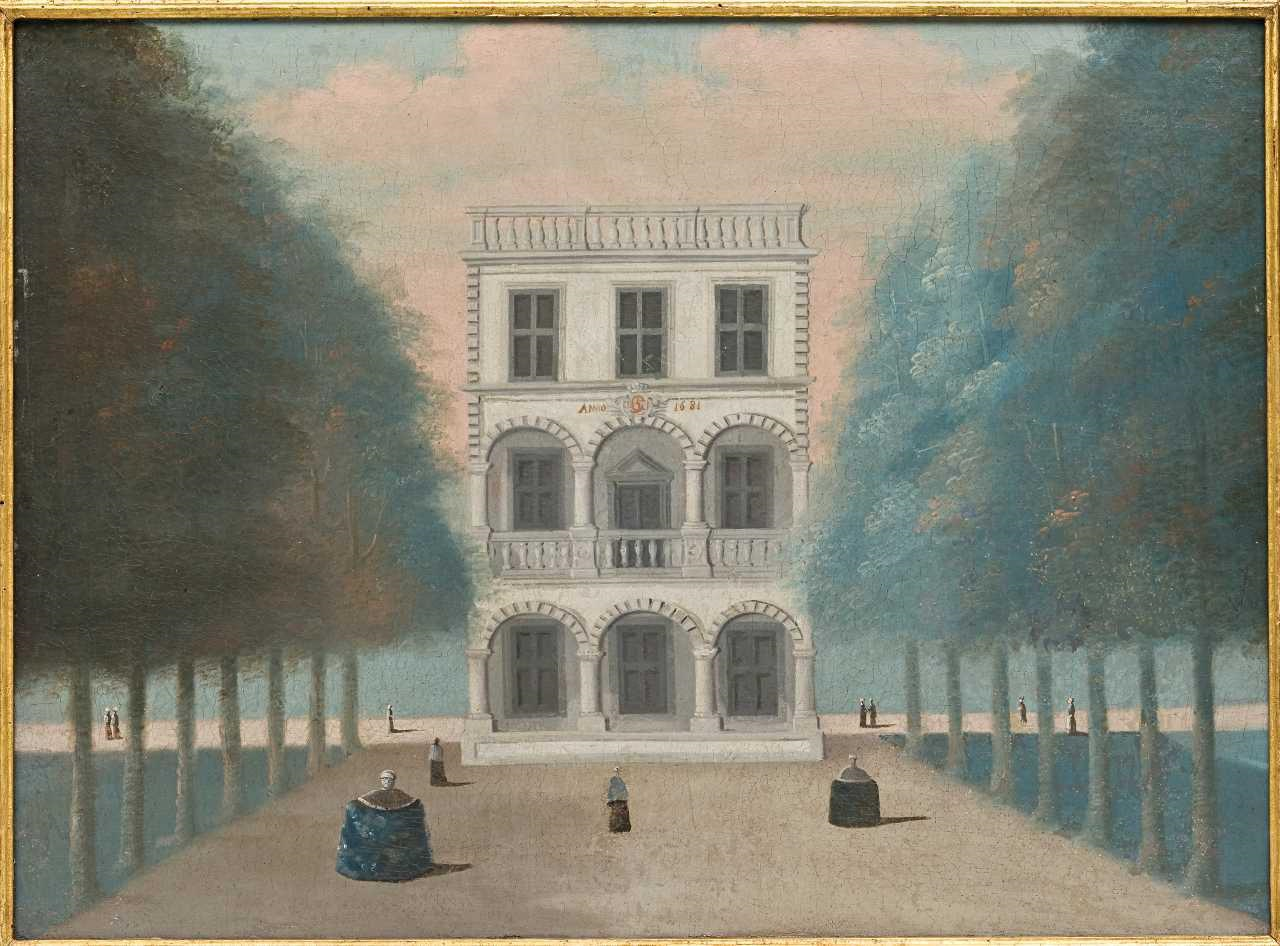
Steenwinckel's pavilion painted by H. H. Eegberg in 1750

It was King Christian V of Denmark who once again brought life back to the pavilion, often coming to hunt and relax in the gardens. He was also the first to give it a complete renovation. This was done between 1680 and 1681 by Hans van Steenwinckel Jr. to repair the damage that had been caused by general aging over the last century and the recent war with Sweden. Steenwinckel Jr. kept to his father's original drawings, making only a few minor cosmetic changes, like the addition of Christian V's monogram and the year 1681.

From 1699 till 1723, the pavilion was owned by Frederick IV of Denmark who renovated it between 1716 and 1717. The king would not return after his marriage to Anne Sophie Reventlow on April 4, 1721. Frederick V of Denmark decided in 1747 to lease Lundhave for four years to Lieutenant Burghof and then, in 1751, sold the property to Johannes G. Putscher, a citizen of Helsingør.

=== Frederik V's pleasure palace ===
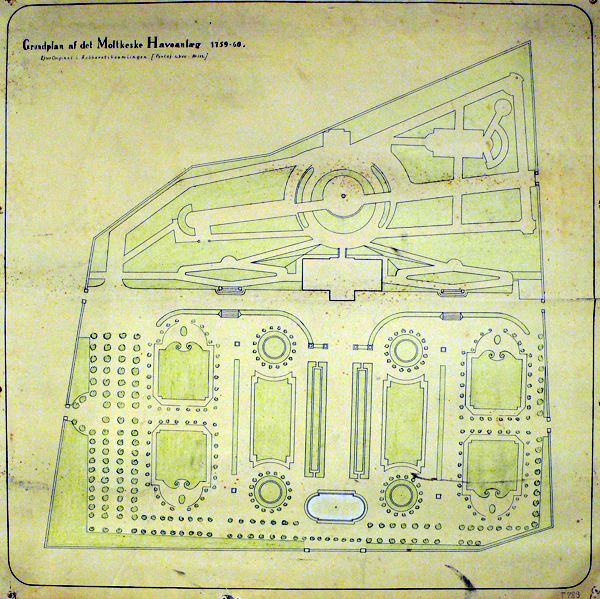
Garden plan from 1759–60

Lord Chamberlain, Count Adam Gottlob Moltke purchased Lundhave in 1758. It is believed he acted on Frederik V's behalf as the deed was issued to the king in 1760 and kept secret until his death in 1766. During these years, Count Moltke completely changed Frederik II's pavilion with the help of French architect Nicolas-Henri Jardin, whose additions led to its present-day architectural structure and façade.

Jardin's initial instructions were to preserve the original pavilion, but he decided to build extensions on either side of the original building, thus creating a palace. They would be of the same height and depth but pulled back a little so as to allow the original pavilion to stand out in relation to the additions. The original lines were preserved and the entire building was brought together visually by a strong rotating main cornice, crowned by a balustrade around the flat roof. The building's exterior also had horizontal bands of polished stone, medallions, festive additions over the windows and arcades on the second floor, emphasizing the classical architecture that Jardin had introduced to Denmark. The interior decoration had a number of prestigious Louis XVI interiors created by artists such as painter Carl Gustaf Pilo, decorators Joseph Christian Lillie, Johan Edvard Mandelberg and sculptor Simon Carl Stanley. The parterre gardens were changed to a larger garden à la française design, with symmetrical hedging, avenues, boxwood hedges, fountains and mirror ponds.

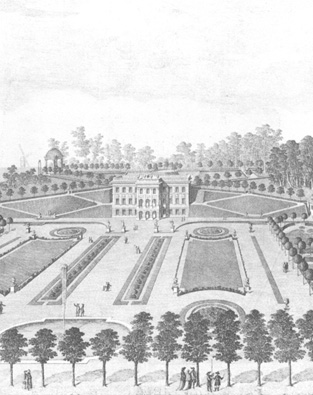
Marienlyst with Jardin's garden complex

King Frederik V only had a few years to enjoy their work as he died in 1766 after which Queen Juliana Maria took possession of the castle. It was renamed Marienlyst (Mary's Delight) in her honor and in the 1790s she had a romantic garden laid out with winding paths, follies, including tumuli, hermit cottages and a medieval style Gothic tower. She would use the castle often until her death in 1796.

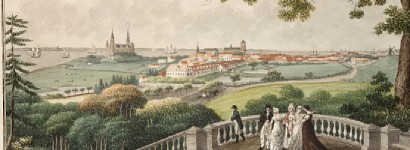
View from the roof terrace towards Helsingør, Kronborg and the Øresund, 1804

During the transition period after her death, there was talk of Crown Prince Frederik taking up residence there but it was not to be. Instead, between 1796 and 1847, it became the residence of the director-general of Øresund Custom House, Colonel Adam Gottlob von Krogh and his wife Magdalene. He built a small thatched half-timbered house, and Krogh's garden in a little grove on the property in 1800. The building is no longer visible but parts of the small stone fence around the garden can still be seen. Close to the garden is Magdalene's Hill where von Krogh set up a monument in the 1830s honoring his wife. He died in 1839, but his widow remained in residence until her death in 1847.

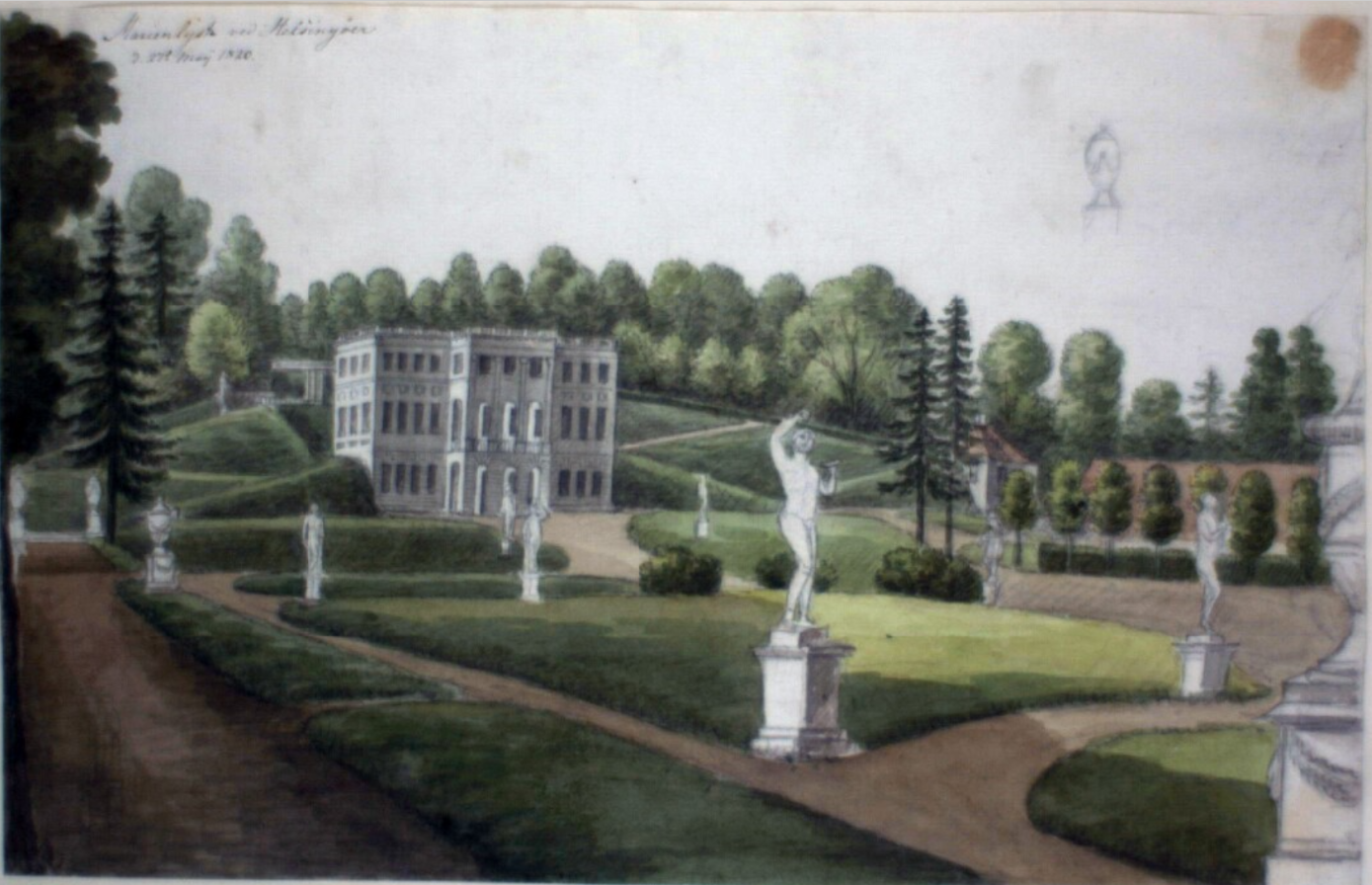
Ole Jørgen Rawert: Marienlyst, 27 May 1820

In his 1824 book Denmark Delineated, Andreas Andersen Feldborg referred to the romantic gardens: "Hamlet's garden is the favorite promenade of the inhabitants of Elsinore (Helsingør). It is generally filled with groups of elegant females and lovely children, whose manners and appearance bear pleasing testimony to the state of society in this part of his Danish Majesty's dominions." Just two years later, a young Hans Christian Andersen also writes about Marienlyst, during a class outing whilst at grammar school in Helsingør. It is worth noting that his youthful excitement shows that he had yet to travel abroad very much: "Yesterday I was with Meisling in Marienlyst; oh, it's one of the finest I've seen! Where sea and the whole countryside is lovely. Meisling says that the whole coast here is similar to that of Naples; the glorious hills are there in the garden, everything seems like Switzerland, and I felt so unspeakably happy, oh, one must become a poet or artist to see the beautiful nature. O Benefactor, Thanks! Thank you! for every happy moment! Life is Wonderful!"

=== Sold to Helsingør municipality ===
The entire property was offered for sale at public auction by King Frederick VII of Denmark in 1851. The Helsingør municipality purchased it for 32,000 Rigsbankdaler, parceling out most of the land, then renting out the castle to J.S. Nathanson with his nearby Marienlyst Health Spa and Bathing House (Marienlyst Kur og Søbad). He renovated the castle, making it part of his resort. The connection to the health spa closed in 1896 and, in 1904, the castle was rented out as accommodation for three families.

== Park ==
The park was converted to its present appearance between 1919 and 1921 under the leadership of local gardener Gudmund Nyeland Brandt. It would not be a reconstruction of the Jardin gardens but instead a reinterpretation of 17th century neoclassical style, appropriate to castle's classical design.

== Today ==
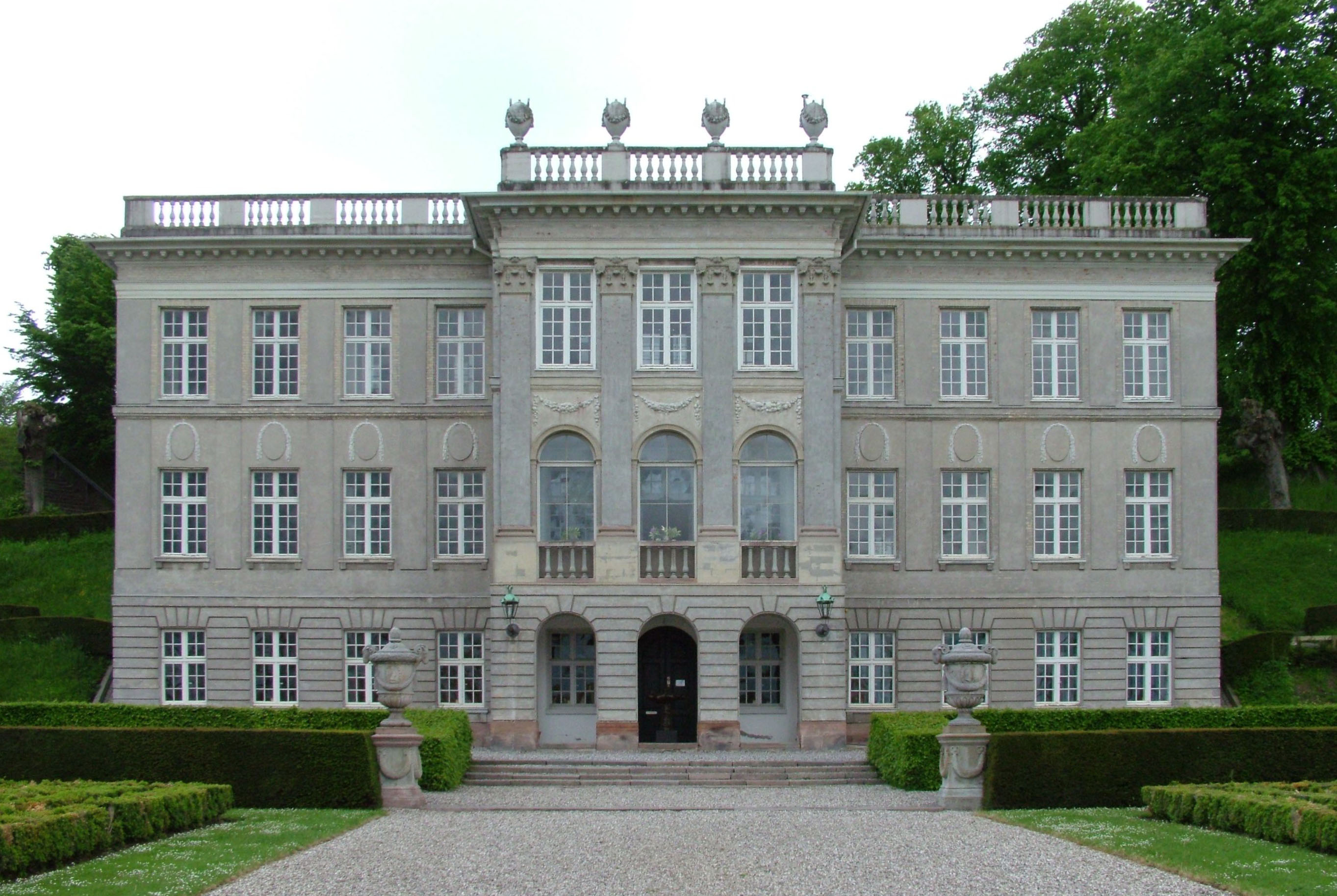
The facade

In 1930, the Town Museum moved into the basement and, in 1940, the whole building was taken over by the museum. After thorough restoration in 1953 by architect Volmars Drosted, Marienlyst was used as offices for Helsingør City Council.

Marienlyst Castle is operated today as a branch of the Helsingør Municipality Museums. The castle has a permanent exhibition of paintings and Helsingør silver from the 18th and 19th centuries. They have over the years also organized temporary exhibitions, mainly dealing with the history of art. The painting exhibitions include William Petersen's a forgotten golden age of painting and marine painter Carl Frederik Sørensen. Within the Danish handicraft exhibitions have been shown The Danish Brooch, The Ceramic Jug and Beast of Law.

== Cultural references ==
The park is used as a location in the 1984 drama film Min fynske barndom.

== List of owners ==
- (1438–1536) St. Anna Abbey
- (1536–1751) The Crown Estates
- (1751–1758) Johannes G. Putscher
- (1758–1760) Adam Gottlob Moltke
- (1760–1766) Frederick V of Denmark
- (1766–1767) The Crown Estates
- (1767–1796) Queen Dowager Juliane Marie
- (1796–1839) Frederick VII of Denmark
- (1796–1848) Adam Gottlob von Krogh
- (1848–1850) Christian VIII of Denmark
- (1850–1851) Committee for the formation of an Invalid Hotel
- (1851–) Helsingør Municipality

== See also ==
- Architecture of Denmark

== Sources ==
=== Books ===
- Wad, Gustav Ludvig (1883). Personalhistorisk tidsskrift (in Danish). Vol. 5. Copenhagen: Samfundet for dansk-norsk genealogi og personalhistorie. p. 143.
- Faye, Jan; Hannes Stephensen (1988). Marienlyst Slot : det kongelige lystanlæg ved Helsingør (in Danish). Copenhagen: Christian Ejlers. p. 317. ISBN 978-87-7241-580-2.
- Resen, Peder Hansen (1677). Resen's ATLAS DANICUS 1677 (in Danish). Copenhagen: Det kongelige Bibliotek, Department of Maps, Prints & Photographs. pp. 31–32.
- Feldborg, Andreas Andersen (1824). Denmark Delineated; or, sketches of the present state of that country (2 ed.). Edenburgh: Oliver and Boyd, and D. Lizars. p. 384.

=== Journal ===
- Appel, Liv (2005). "Nationalpark Kongernes Nordsjælland, Kulturhistorisk undersøgelse" (PDF) (in Danish). Gilleleje, Denmark: Holbo Herreds Kulturhistoriske Centre, Gilleleje Museum.

=== Online ===
- "1500-tallet". Øresundstid. 2008.
- "Marienlyst Slot" (in Danish). Helsingør Leksikon.
- "25 millioner kickstarter renovering af Marienlyst" (PDF). HELSINGØR (in Danish). Helsingør, Denmark: Sjaellandske media. 5 May 2009.
- "Staten siger nej til Marienlyst Slot" (in Danish). Copenhagen: DR. November 7, 2009.
- "Hans van Steenwinckel" (in Danish). Copenhagen: Den Store Danske Encyklopædi. 2009.
- "Summary of the 19th century". Øresund, Denmark: Øresundstid. 2008.
