= Kaspar Rostrup (businessman) =

Danish lawyer, joiner and politician

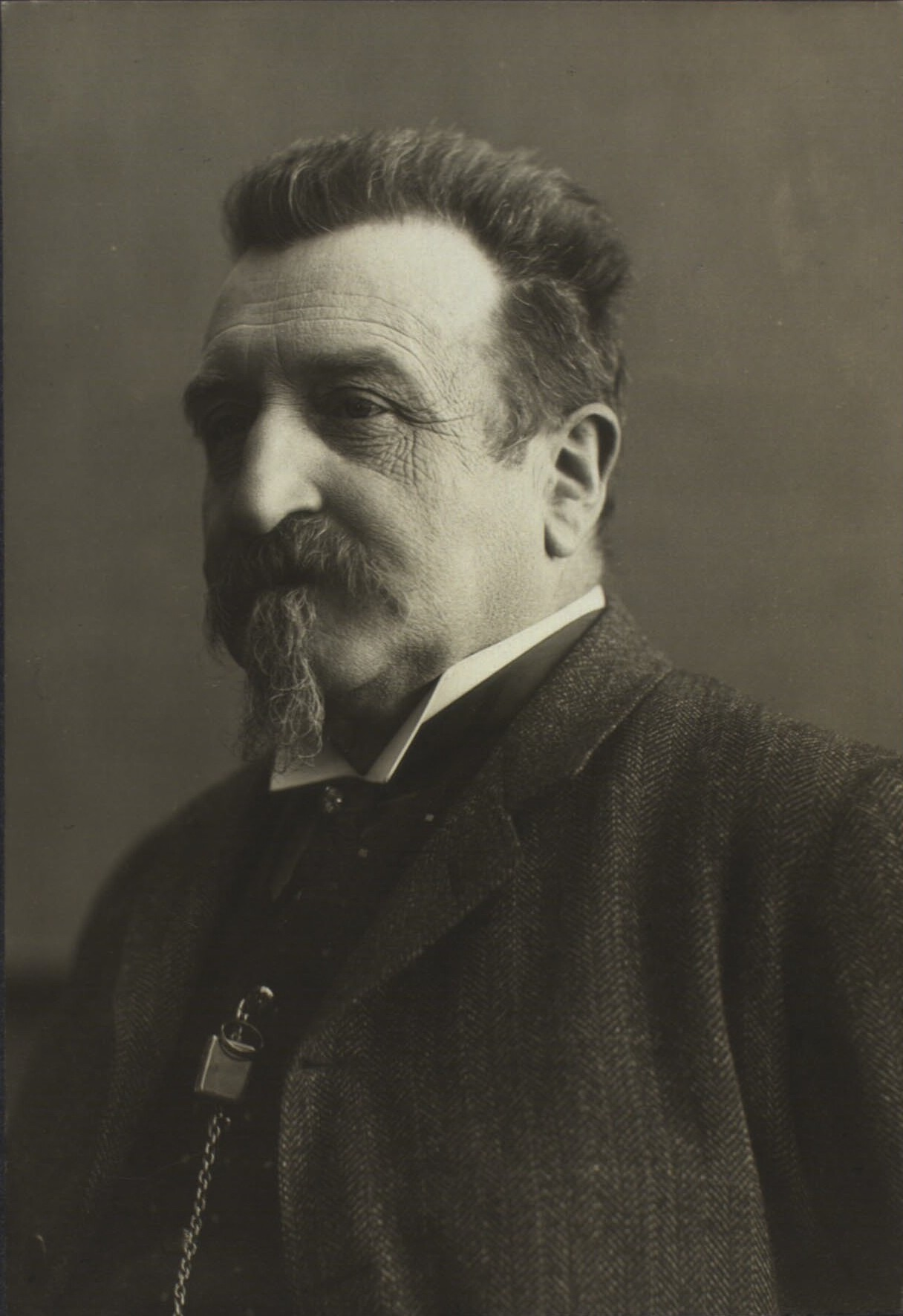
Kaspar Rostrup photographed by Frederik Riise

Kaspar Rostrup (2 August 1845 – 7 January 1911) was a Danish lawyer, joiner and local politician. From 1886, he was the owner of N. P. Rostrup, a Copenhagen-based coffin manufacturer and retailer headquartered at Valkendorfsgade 36. He was a member of the Copenhagen City Council from 1894 to 1900, as well as president of the Association of Craftsmen in Copenhagen from 1896 and the Confederation of Danish Employers from 1907 to 1911.

== Early life and education ==
Rostrup was born on 2 August 1845 in Copenhagen. His father, Nicolai Peter Rostrup, was a master joiner, who had earlier founded a joinery business under the name "N. P. Rostrup". The firm would later specialize in the manufacturing and selling of coffins. Kaspar Rostrup graduated from the Borgerdyd School in 1863 and went on to study law at the University of Copenhagen, matriculating in 1869.

== Career ==
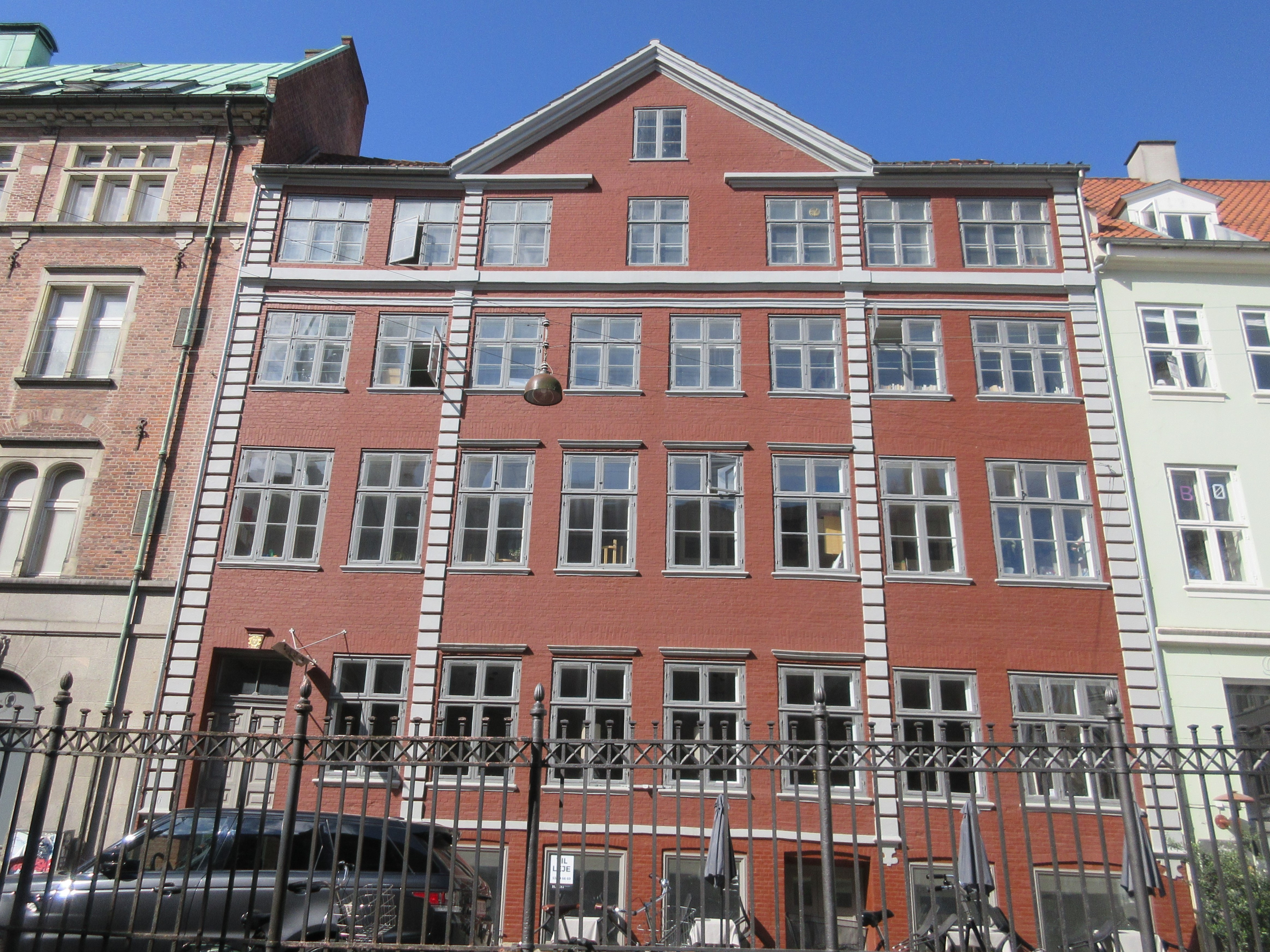
Rostrup's building at Valkendorfsgade 36 in Copenhagen

Rostrup took over the family business following his father's death and was himself licensed as a master joiner in 1886. The firm was based at Valkendorfsgade 36. Rostrup was president of the Association of Craftsmen in Copenhagen from 1886, alderman of the Joiner's Guild from 1898 and president of the Confederation of Danish Employers and Master Craftsmen (Dansk Arbejdsgiverforening) from 1907to 1911. He was also active in local politics, serving as a member of the Copenhagen City Council from 1894 to 1900.

== Personal life and legacy ==
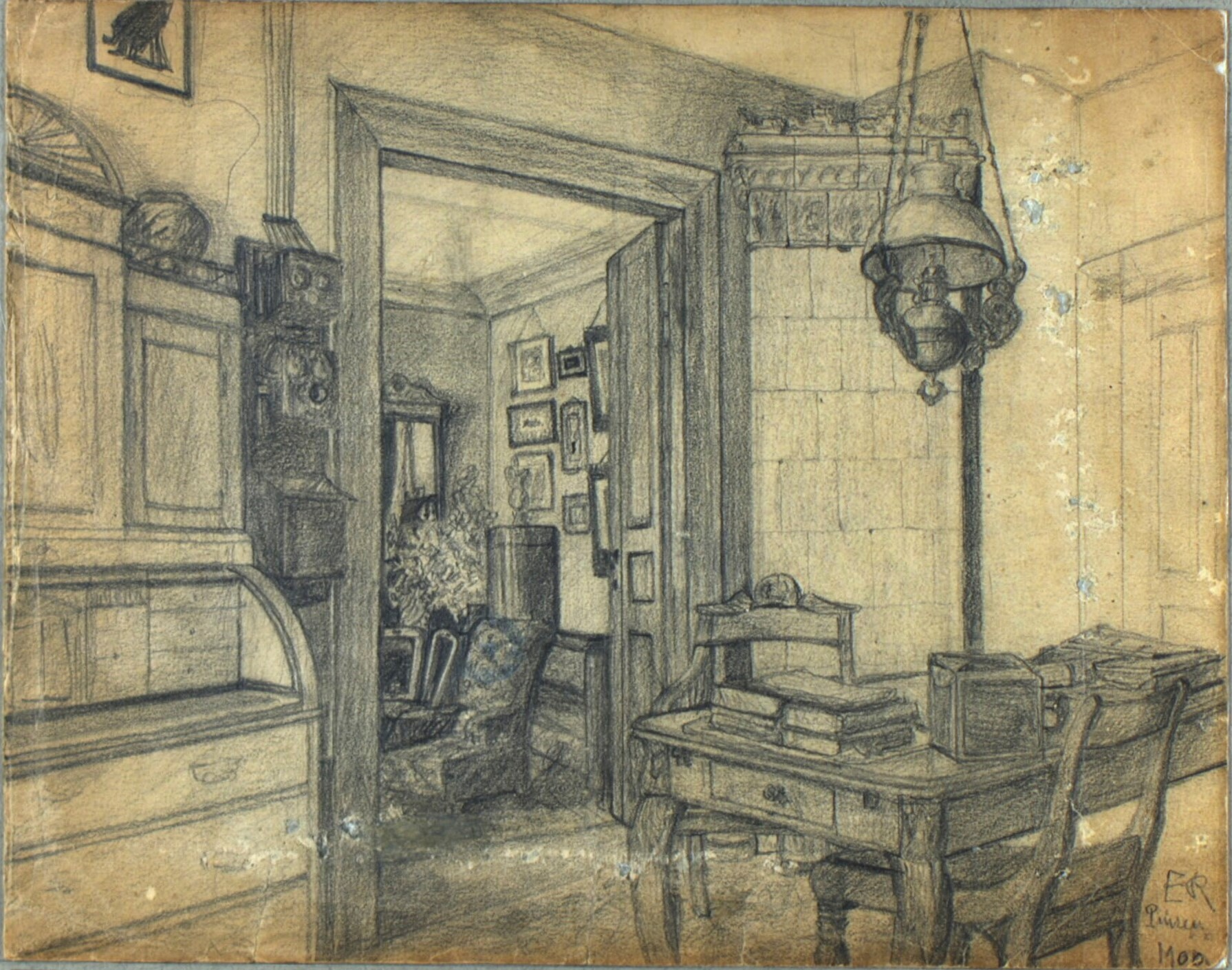
Kasper Rostrup's home at Valkendorfsgade 36 seen on a drawing by Emil Rostrup, 1900

Rostrup had his home in the firm's building at Valkendorfsgade 36. He died on 7 January 1911 and is buried at the Assistens Cemetery in Copenhagen.

N. P. Rostrup was after Kasper Rostrup's death continued by his son Aage Rostrup (1877–1957). It was continued after his death by his widow, Anne Rostrup. The company is still active today. It is now based in Herlev.

== See also ==
- N. P. Rostrup
