= Valkendorfsgade 36 =

Baroque-style townhouse in Copenhagen, Denmark

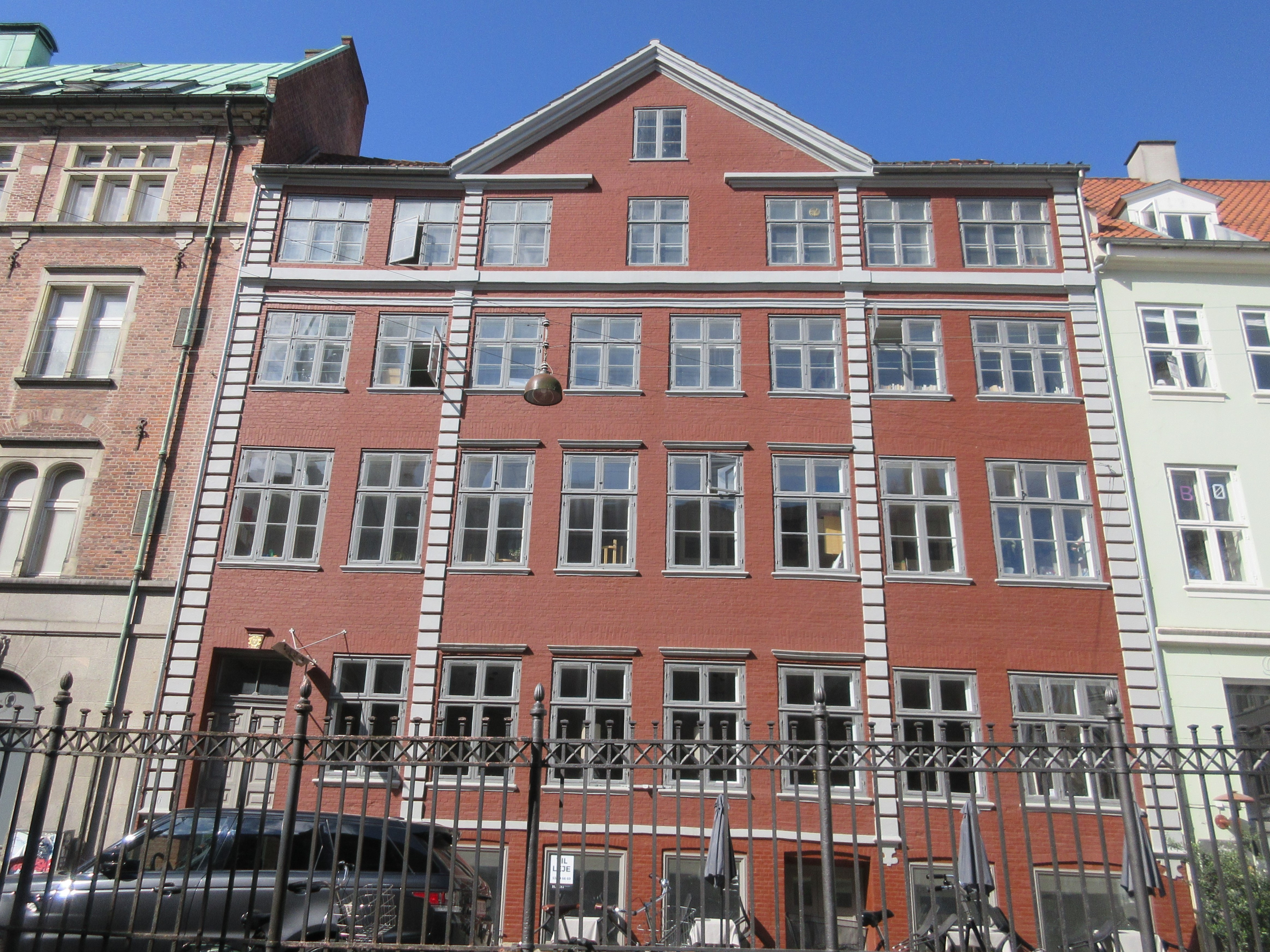

General information
- Location: Copenhagen, Denmark
- Coordinates: 55°40′44.58″N 12°34′33.85″E
- Completed: 1739

Valkendorfsgade 36, situated opposite the House of the Holy Ghost, off the shopping street Strøget is a Baroque style townhouse in the Old Town of Copenhagen, Denmark. The building was listed on the Danish registry of protected buildings and places in 1918.

== History ==
=== Early history ===
The site was in 1689 part of a larger property )No. 19= owned by Anna Rommel's heirs. The current building was constructed in 1838 for a bookkeeper named Rohde. It was later acquired by the painter Christian Peter Getreuer. He was appointed court painter in 1749. The property was from 1756 known as No. 138. Getreuer owned the building until his death in 1780.

The property was in the new cadastre of 1806 listed as No. 134. It was by then owned by pastry cook (konditor) Horn's heirs. Jens Giødwad, a journalist and future editor of the newspaper Fædrelandet, was a resident of the building in the late 1830s.

=== Rostrup family ===
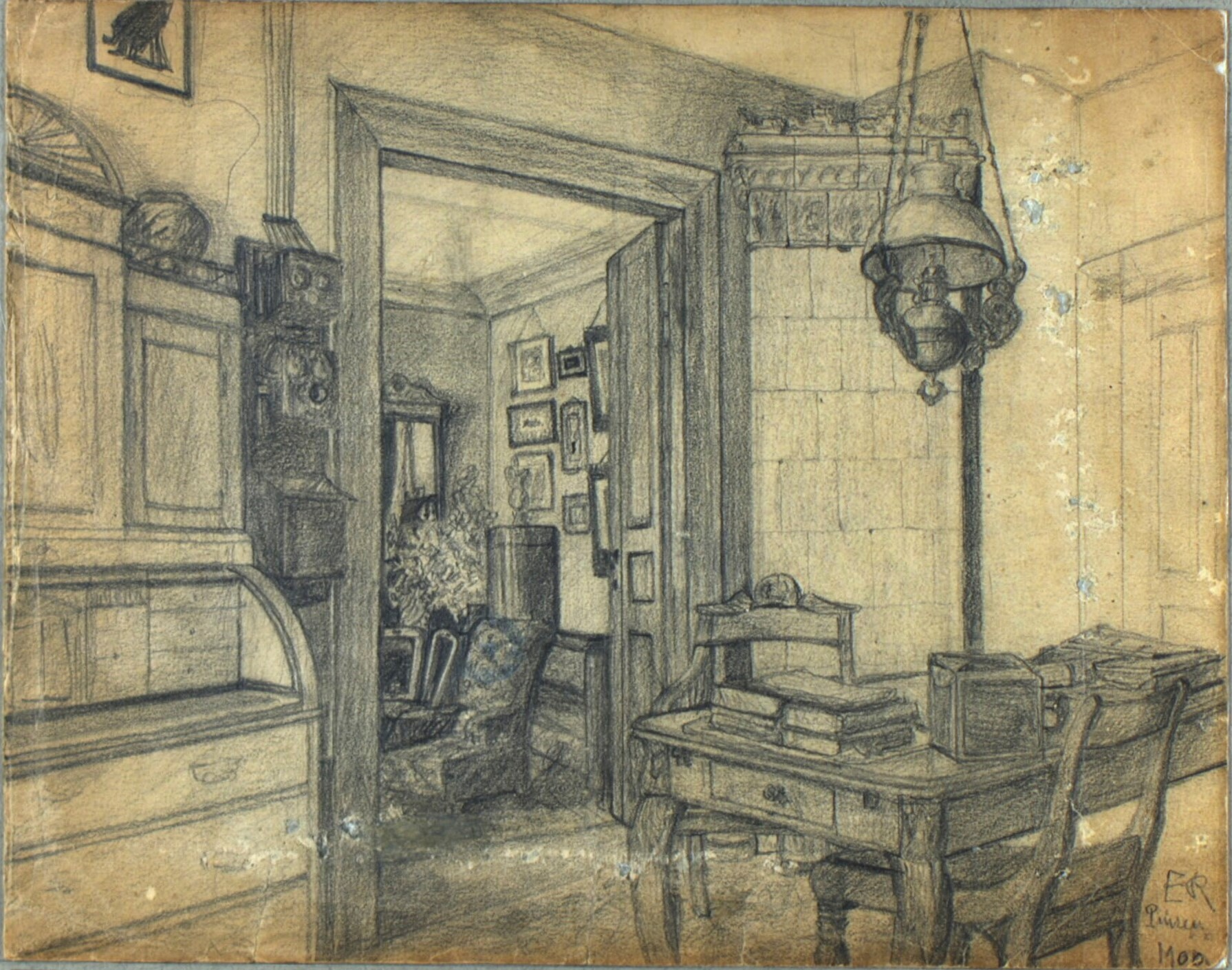
Kasper Rostrup's home at Valkendorfsgade 36 seen on a drawing by Emil Rostrup, 1900

Nicolai Peter Rostrup—a lawyer-turned-master carpenter and casket manufacturer—purchased the building in 1865. He both had his home in the building and ran his business from the premises. Rostrp's son, Kaspar Rostrup, an attorney, continued the business after his father's death, qualifying as a master joiner in 1866.

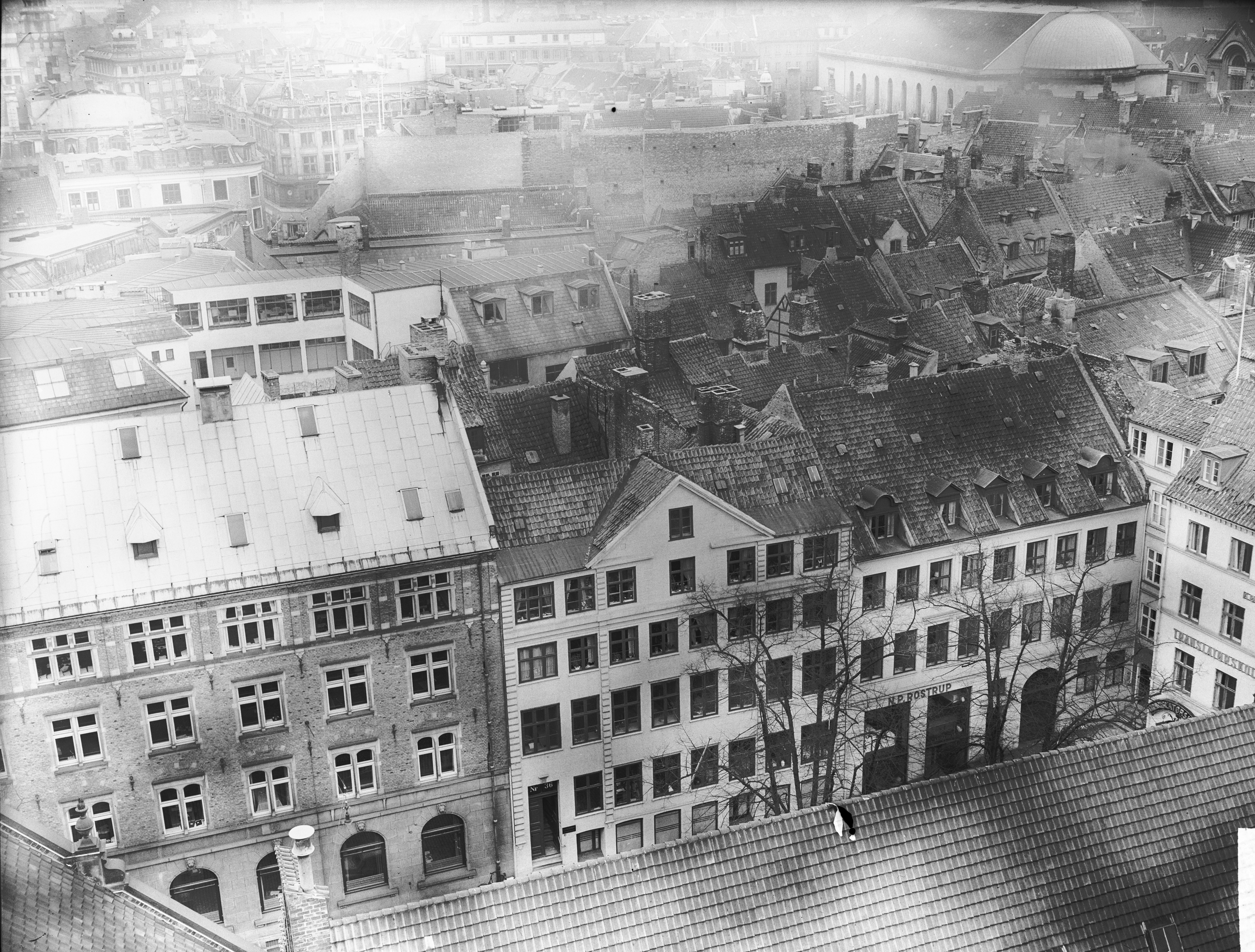
The building viewed from the top of the adjacent church tower, 15 March 1954.

N. P. Rostrup was after Kaspar Rostrup's death continued by his son Aage Rostrup and after his death in 1946 by his widow Anne Rostrup. The firm was based at Valkendorfsgade 36 into at least the 1950s.

FDF rented a 4-room apartment on the second floor from April 1916. In 1942 the organisation moved to larger premises at Frederiksborggade 5.

== Architecture ==
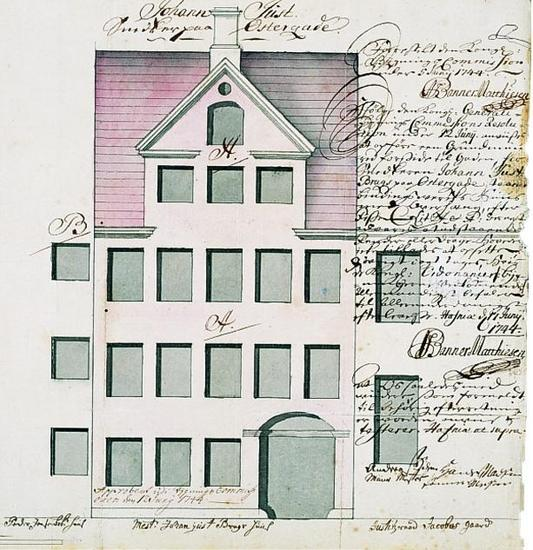
One of Johan Cornelius Krieger's fire houses

The building was in its original form an example of one of the large version of Johan Cornelius Krieger's so-called fire house designs. After the Great Fire of 1728, Krieger was instructed to create a number of generic designs which were to serve as inspiration for craftsmen in connection with the rebuilding of the city. Architects were in that day only engaged in individual construction projects by the crown and nobility. Valkendorfsgade 36 was then an eight bays widethree-storey building with a prominent gabled wall dormer. The building was in 1886 heightened by one floor on each side of the wall dormer.

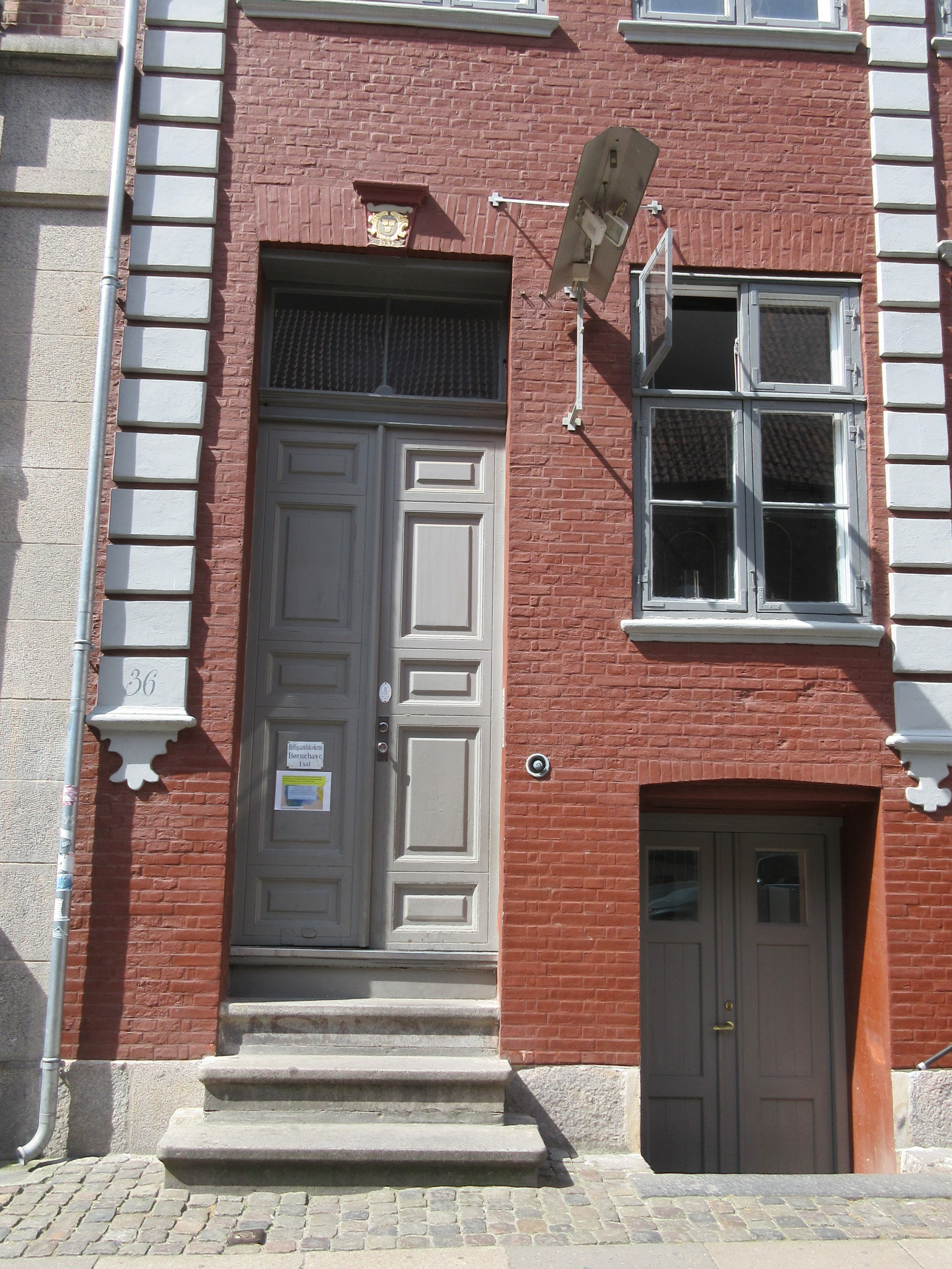
Main entrance

The facade towards the street is constructed in brick. It is painted in a reddish-brown colour with white decorative details. The facade is decorated with four quoin lesenes supported by Fleur-de-lis ornaments at the transition between the raised cellar and ground floor. The building's original cornice Is still seen between the third and fourth floor, highlighting the transition between the old and new part of the facade. The main entrance in the southernmost bay is raised four steps from street level. The keystone above the main entrance features Getreuer's coat of arms as well as the year "1739". The roof is clad with red tile.

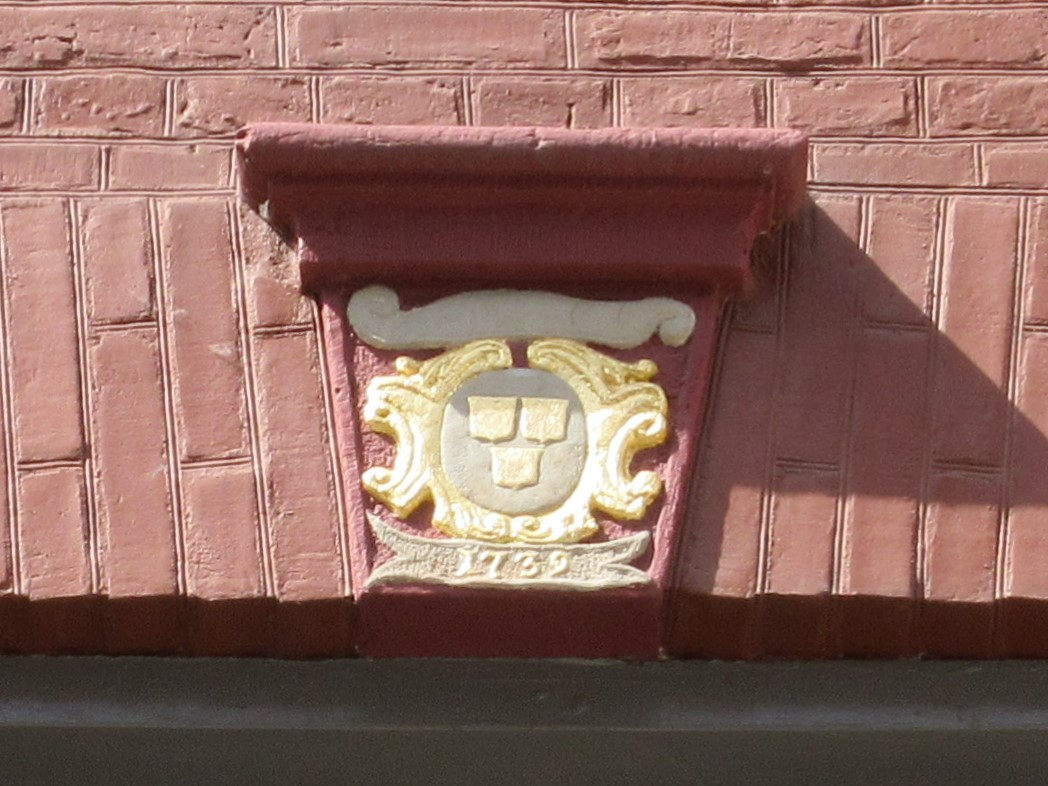
The keystone

A rear wing projects from the rear side of the building. The facade towards the yard m both of the main wing and the side wing, is constructed with timber framing.

The building was listed on the Danish registry of protected buildings and places in 1918. It was restored in 2018. The restoration work received a bronze medal at the Renover Awards.

== Today ==
The building is still owned by the Rostrup (Rostrup Tjalve) family. A restaurant is now based in the ground floor of the building. A kindergarten is based on the first floor.
