= Copenhagen Fire of 1728 =

Historic fire in Copenhagen, Denmark

Coordinates: 55.6766°N 12.5693°E

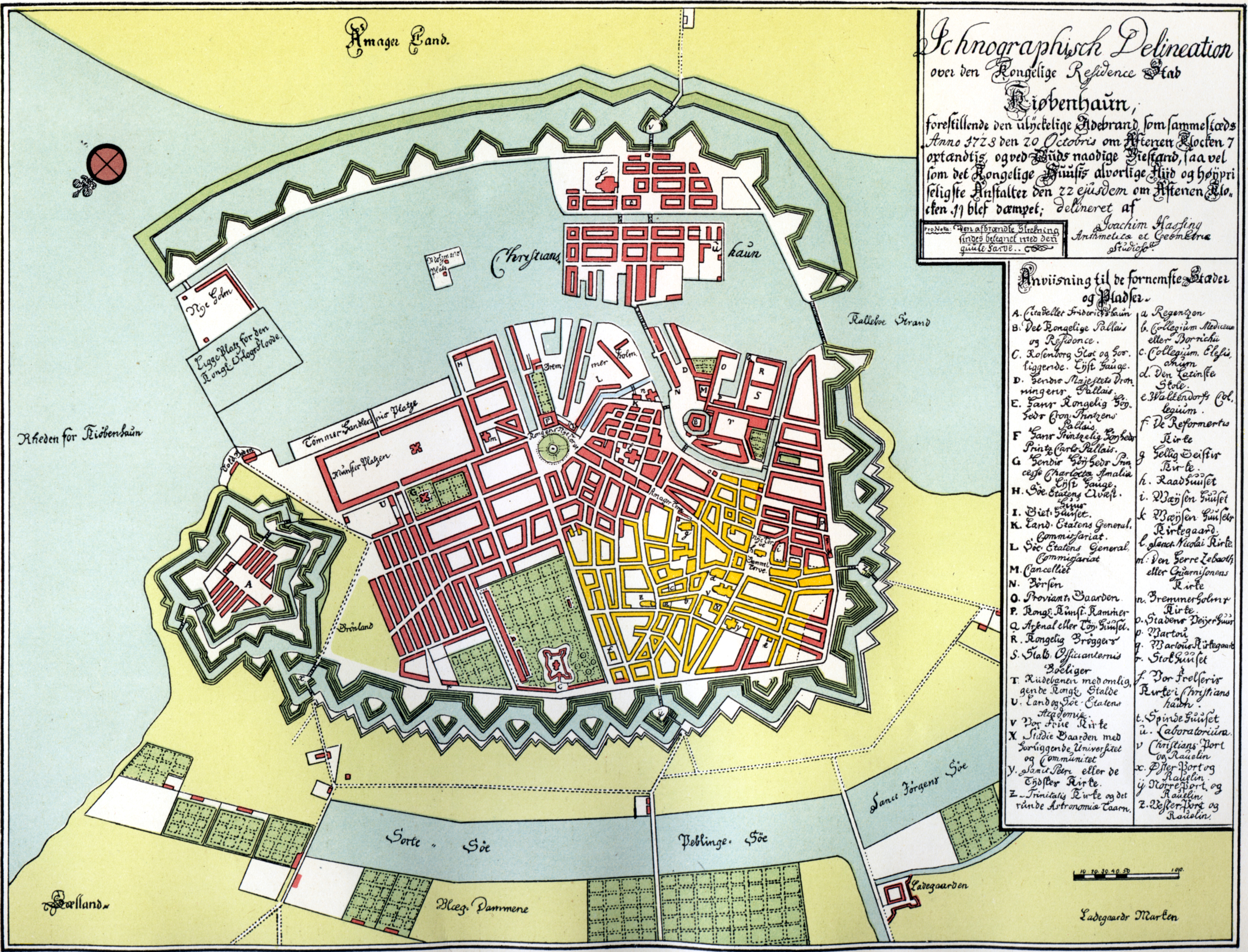
Buildings which burned are shown in yellow on this map of Copenhagen in 1728 by Joachim Hassing.

The Copenhagen Fire of 1728 was the largest fire in the history of Copenhagen, Denmark. It began on the evening of 20 October 1728 and continued to burn until the morning of the 23rd of October 1728. It destroyed approximately 28% of the city (measured by counting the number of destroyed lots from the cadastre) and left 20% of the population homeless. The reconstruction lasted until 1737. No less than 47% of the section of the city, which dates back to the Middle Ages, was completely lost, and along with the Copenhagen Fire of 1795, it is the main reason that few traces of medieval Copenhagen can be found in the modern city.

Although the number of dead and wounded was relatively low compared to the extent of the fire, the cultural losses were huge. In addition to several private book collections, 35,000 texts including a large number of unique works were lost with the University of Copenhagen library, and at the observatory on top of Rundetårn, instruments and records made by Tycho Brahe and Ole Rømer were destroyed.

== Timeline ==
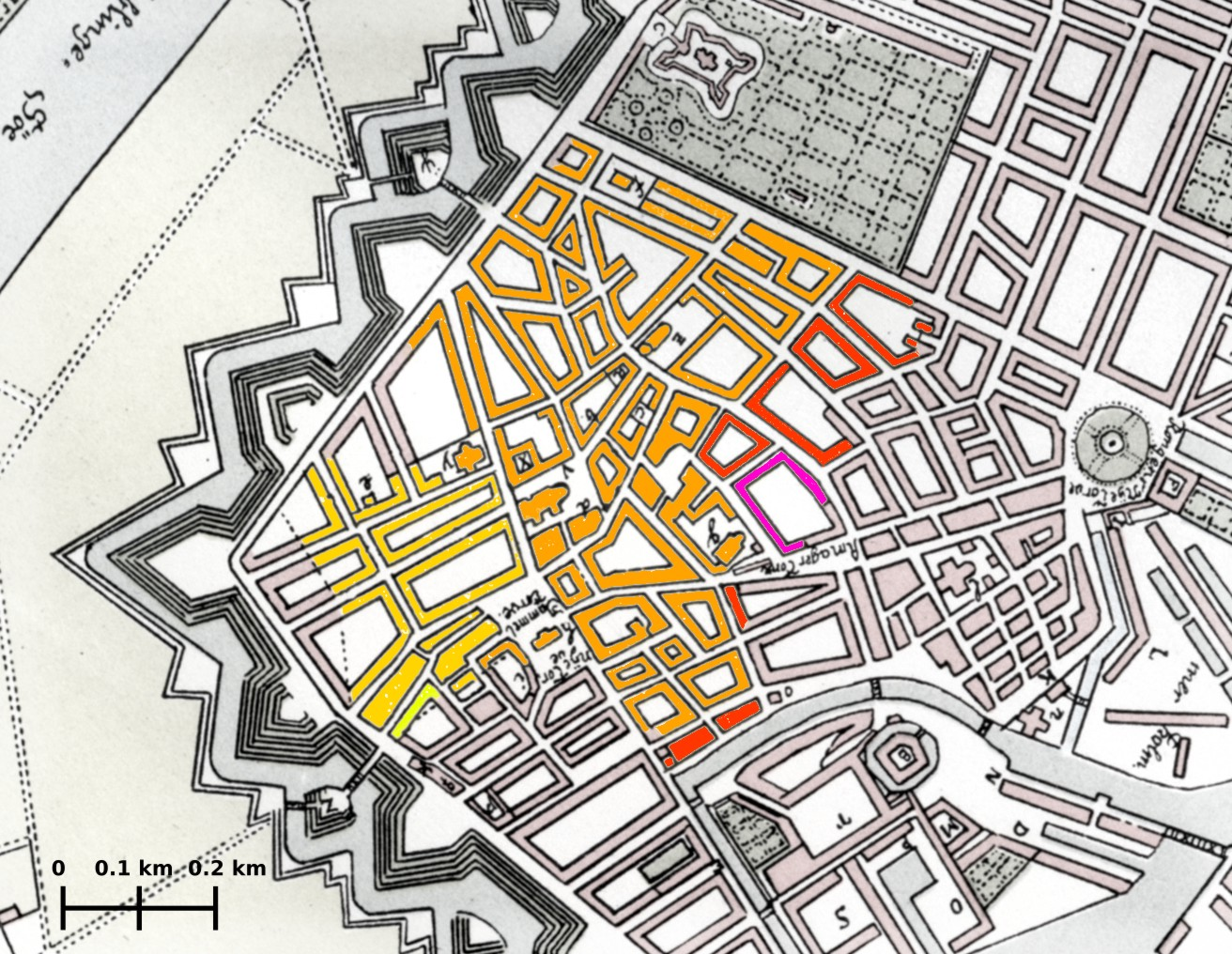
Section of Joachim Hassing's map color-coded to illustrate the approximate progress of the fire, showing the origin of the fire (bright yellow) and the area affected by midnight on Wednesday (dark yellow), by midnight on Thursday (orange), by midnight on Friday (red) and by Saturday (purple).

=== Wednesday 20 October ===
The exact time that the fire started is unknown. Various sources mention times between 6:00 and 8:00 p.m., and 7:30 p.m. is the best estimate. However, the exact location of the origin of the fire is known. Almost directly across the street from Vesterport (the West Gate) was Lille Sankt Clemens Stræde. On the corner facing Vestervold, there was a small house on lot "Vester Kvarter 146" (according to the cadastre of 1699) owned by Signe, widow of Boye Hansen. The lot is almost identical to the one on the corner of present-day Frederiksberggade (the western end of Strøget) and The City Hall Square. Among the widow's tenants were restaurant manager Peder Rasmussen and his wife, Anne Iversdatter. It was on the second floor of the restaurateur's apartment that the fire started. At the inquiries held after the fire was over, both he and his wife stated that their seven-year-old son had started the fire by accidentally upsetting a candle, but it is more likely that it was the result of carelessness on the part of the parents while casting candles and that they blamed the child to avoid punishment.

The watchmen were quick to sound the alarm, but given the fire department's relatively primitive equipment, the fact that the streets of Vester Kvarter were too narrow for the fire pumps, the strange dispositions of those fighting the fire, and a series of unlucky events, the fight was nearly hopeless. The wind blew from the southwest that evening, carrying the fire along Lille Sankt Clemens Stræde, Store Sankt Clemens Stræde, Vombadstuestræde, Antiquitetsstræde and Hellig-Kors Stræde. By 9:00 p.m the main street of Vestergade was burning on both sides. From here the fire spread along Store Lars Bjørns Stræde, Lille Lars Bjørns Stræde and Studiestræde.

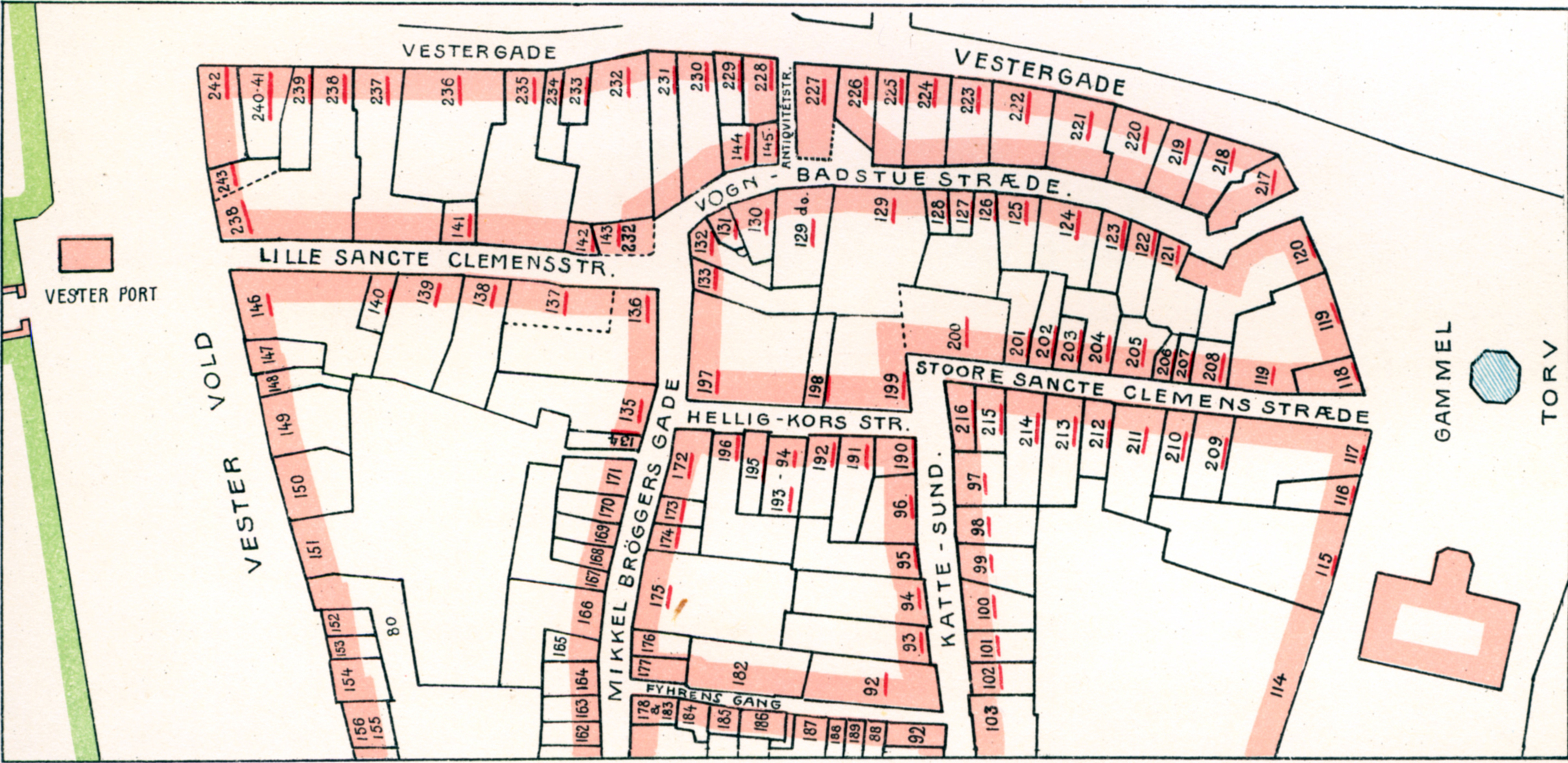
Map of Vester Kvarter where the fire started with the lot numbers from the cadastre of 1699. The numbers of the burned lots are underlined in red.

Later that evening, the fire reached Sankt Peders Stræde, where the Valkendorfs Kollegium dormitory (lot "Nørre Kvarter 122") was engulfed in flames. Professor Peder Horrebow, who lived at the dormitory, lost most of his possessions. Presumably simultaneously, the fire also reached Professor Hans Steenbuch's room on Studiestræde (lot "Nørre Kvarter 60"). Around midnight, the fire reached the priest's residence by the church Sankt Petri Kirke.

On Nørregade, another fire started at a brewery Wednesday evening – possibly between 10 p.m. and 11 p.m. Just prior to that the original fire had reached Gammeltorv, where people fought to keep the fire back. For that reason, help was sent late to deal with the new fire. Around midnight the wind shifted to the west, and the situation on Nørregade turned critical as the fire was driven towards the street along a wide front. At first people sought to keep the fire on the western side of Nørregade, but nevertheless it spread to the eastern side during the night. Simultaneously, the fire moved from present day Nørre Voldgade towards Nørreport (North Gate).

=== Thursday ===
Early Thursday morning, a final desperate attempt to keep the flames from spreading was made at Gammeltorv. Already-burning houses were fired upon with cannons to make them collapse. When that did not work, an order was given to blow up the houses with black powder charges. The building housing the wine cellar known as "Blasen" on the corner of Vestergade and Nørregade was to be the first demolition, but this dangerous undertaking failed when the gunpowder blew up while men were still carrying in the charges. While the building did go down, people were killed and injured and the explosion ignited nearby buildings, including the church Vor Frue Kirke. By 9:30 a.m. the church spire had fallen into the street, and soon after the whole church was engulfed in flames; the personal property that people had brought to the church to keep them safe from the fire was lost.

At Nørregade, the fire reached Sankt Petri Kirke around 8 a.m. By 9 a.m., the flames reached bishop Christen Worm's residence (lot "Nørre Kvarter 112"), which burned to the ground. The bishop who was travelling, was left with the clothes on his back and three prayer books.

At Nytorv, the flames consumed Det Kongelige Vajsenhus (The Royal Orphanage) (now the location of the Copenhagen District Court). The City Hall of Copenhagen – then located between Nytorv and Gammeltorv – was now in peril. Around 10 a.m., the flames had taken hold of the building and it was soon added to the list of buildings lost. From Gammeltorv the inferno made its way down Klædeboderne, Skindergade, Skoubogade and Vimmelskaftet, heading towards Amagertorv, while from Nytorv the fire found fuel on Rådhusstræde towards Frederiksholms Canal and Slotsholmen.

New fires were reported: Count Adam Christoffer Knuth's house in Pustervig, a cellar in Købmagergade (Market Street) and a haystack at Nørreport (Northern Gate) all broke out in flames; the latter likely ignited by embers carried by the wind.

When the fire had consumed Vor Frue Kirke, the University of Copenhagen saw one building after another burn. The Community Building (Kommunitetsbygningen), which was used to help support students by giving them free meals; the university's head building (Studiegården/The Study Courtyard), at the same location as the current head building; and the Anatomy Building (Domus Anatomica) and Anatomy Theatre (Theatrum Anatomicum) were all lost. Aforementioned, Professor Hans Steenbuch had sought refuge at Professor Hans Gram's home, where both he and his possessions found temporary safety. But now the fire reached Gram's home next to Vor Frue Kirke (lot "Klædebo Kvarter 245"), and there was not enough time to save Steenbuch's possessions, although Gram saved most of his own from destruction. Along Kannikestræde, one by one University of Copenhagen professors' homes fell prey to the flames. Several more student dormitories were lost but along Købmagergade a wing of buildings were saved including the church Regenskirken.

The next notable victim of the fire was the church Trinitatis Kirke, which housed the University Library in its attic. The flames got a hold of the church around 5 p.m. and when the ceiling gave around 10 p.m., the entire library's collection was delivered into a sea of flames. Rundetårn was left for the most part undamaged, but the observatory at the top burned out.

From Gammeltorv, the fire spread out to Ulfeldts Plads, now Gråbrødretorv, around 4 p.m. The monument that shamed traitor Corfitz Ulfeldt lost a few letters in the heat. A few hours later, the fire closed in on the church Helligåndskirken and at 8 p.m. its carillon bells came to life as they did every half-hour – playing Thomas Kingo's Vreden din afvend, herre Gud, af Naade (Eng. Turn your anger, Lord, by mercy) – just before they crashed into the fire below.

From Trinitatis Church, the fire continued down Landemærket towards Gothersgade. Here, the fire met up with the other branch of the fire which ate its way down present day Nørre Voldgade. Around midnight, the church Reformert Kirke was ablaze. The only place in the city where there was some control over the fire was around Vandkunsten.

=== Friday ===
Friday morning the wind shifted again, this time to the north. The firefighting finally started to show some semblance of organization, and efforts were waged to stop the fire in the neighborhood around Magstræde. This failed, though, when the fire took the soap factory on Magstræde around noon. The wind was now blowing northwest and the firefighting moved via Snaregade to Nybrogade, Naboløs and Gammel Strand, but failed to save Nybrogade.

Further east, the fire proceeded south to Klareboderne and Møntergade. Poul Fechtels Hospital on Møntergade was drowned in flames with some of the residents still inside. Close by, Professor Ludvig Holberg left his home on Købmagergade (lot "Købmager Kvarter 18"). Around midnight, the blaze was close to Silkegade and Store Regnegade.

=== Saturday ===
Over the course of the night the wind settled and stopped the forward march of the fire. Thirty-six homes were selected for demolition to create a firebreak, which did stop the fire at the corner of Store Regnegade and Gothersgade. Further west, Amagertorv and the church Sankt Nicolai Kirke had been threatened, but the blaze was stopped close to Amagertorv, where only the three houses furthest north ("Frimands Kvarter" lots 8, 10 and 11) were lost.

The fire on Magstræde at the soap factory was still a threat. The fire ate its way along Snaregade. At the end of Snaregade was the house (lot "Snarens Kvarter 2") of the vice mayor, Christian Berregaard, which the people tried to save. The houses around it were torn down, and the houses on the opposite side of the street were blown up with black powder. The outcome was hardly any better than that of the earlier attempt at the wine cellar, though. The gunpowder went off, people had to run for their lives and the vice mayor's house was set afire and burned to the ground. After the failed attempt to save the house, the fire was stopped from spreading further, though, and among other things the weigh station of Christoffer Valkendorf was saved.

In line with Christian interpretation of the day, the slowdown of the fire during Saturday was seen as a result of divine intervention. To thank God, king Christian VI introduced on 23 October as a new annual holiday in 1731 on which every church in Copenhagen held a service of thanksgiving. This holiday was abolished at the holiday reform of 1770.

== Losses ==
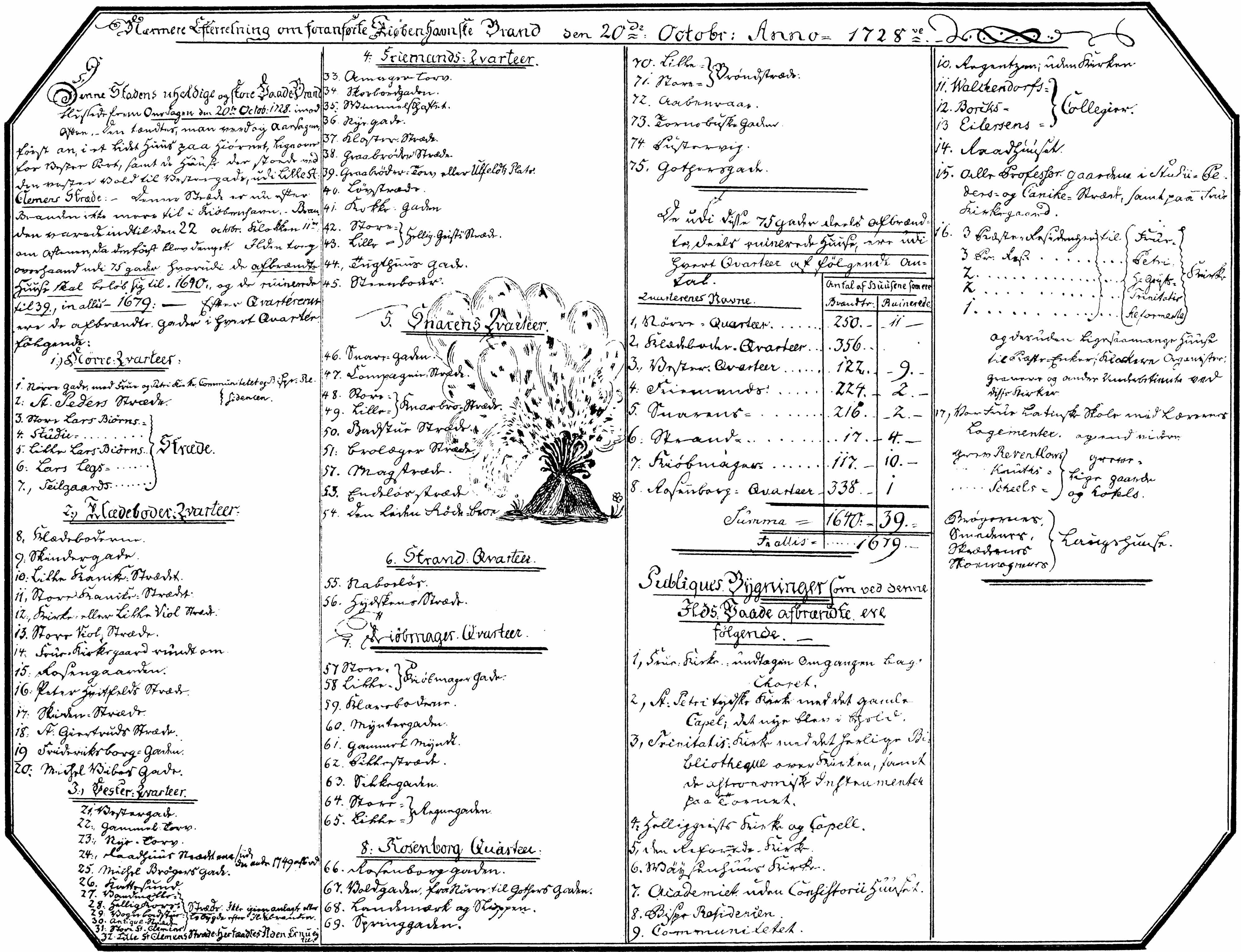
Old statistics attached to the back of the map by Joachim Hassing, according to which 1640 houses burned and another 39 were "ruined". The number is probably a bit too high.

Property losses from the fire can be accounted for with relative certainty as detailed surveys were made immediately afterwards. City surveyor Søren Balle submitted the first survey on 1 November 1728 and on 13 April 1729 the Magistrate of Copenhagen finished a second, made according to a royal request of 12 December 1728. The differences between the two surveys are limited to the extent of the damages on 43 lots, so it is fairly certain that 1,227 lots containing about 1,600 buildings were lost in flames. All of Copenhagen consisted of about 4,500 lots (per the cadastre of 1699), so about 28% of the lots were lost. For the medieval part of town the ratio is 47%.

The magistrate also made a survey of the spared parts of town from which it appears that 8,749 former residents of the parts touched by fire had found new lodgings. It is estimated that as many as 15,000 had become homeless. This is about 20% of the population, which is estimated at 70,000. However the number of dead and wounded is unknown. It is possible to deduce some information from parish registers and other sources, but the number remains uncertain. It is probably low in comparison with the extent of the fire, though.

While the human and property losses were staggering, the cultural loss is still felt today. The University of Copenhagen library was without a doubt the greatest and the most frequently mentioned of such. 35,000 texts and a large archive of historical documents disappeared in the flames. Original works from the historians Hans Svaning, Anders Sørensen Vedel, Niels Krag, and Arild Huitfeldt and the scientists Ole Worm, Ole Rømer, Tycho Brahe and the brothers Hans and Caspar Bartholin were lost. Atlas Danicus by Peder Hansen Resen and the archive of the Diocese of Zealand went up in flames as well. The archive of the diocese had been moved to the university library the very same day the fire started.

Several other book collections were lost as well. Professor Mathias Anchersen made the mistake of bringing his possessions to safety in Trinitatis Church. Árni Magnússon lost all his books, notes and records, but did manage to rescue much of his valuable collection of handwritten Icelandic manuscripts. At Borchs Kollegium 3,150 volumes burned along with its Museum Rarirorum containing collections of zoological and botanical oddities. The burned-out observatory in Rundetårn had contained instruments and records by Tycho Brahe and Ole Rømer. The professors Horrebow, Steenbuch and the two Bartholins lost practically everything. Additionally, a large part of the city archive of records burnt along with city hall.

In the library on top of Trinitatis Church were many things which the world no longer owns; the damage cannot be helped.

— Árni Magnússon

== Consequences ==
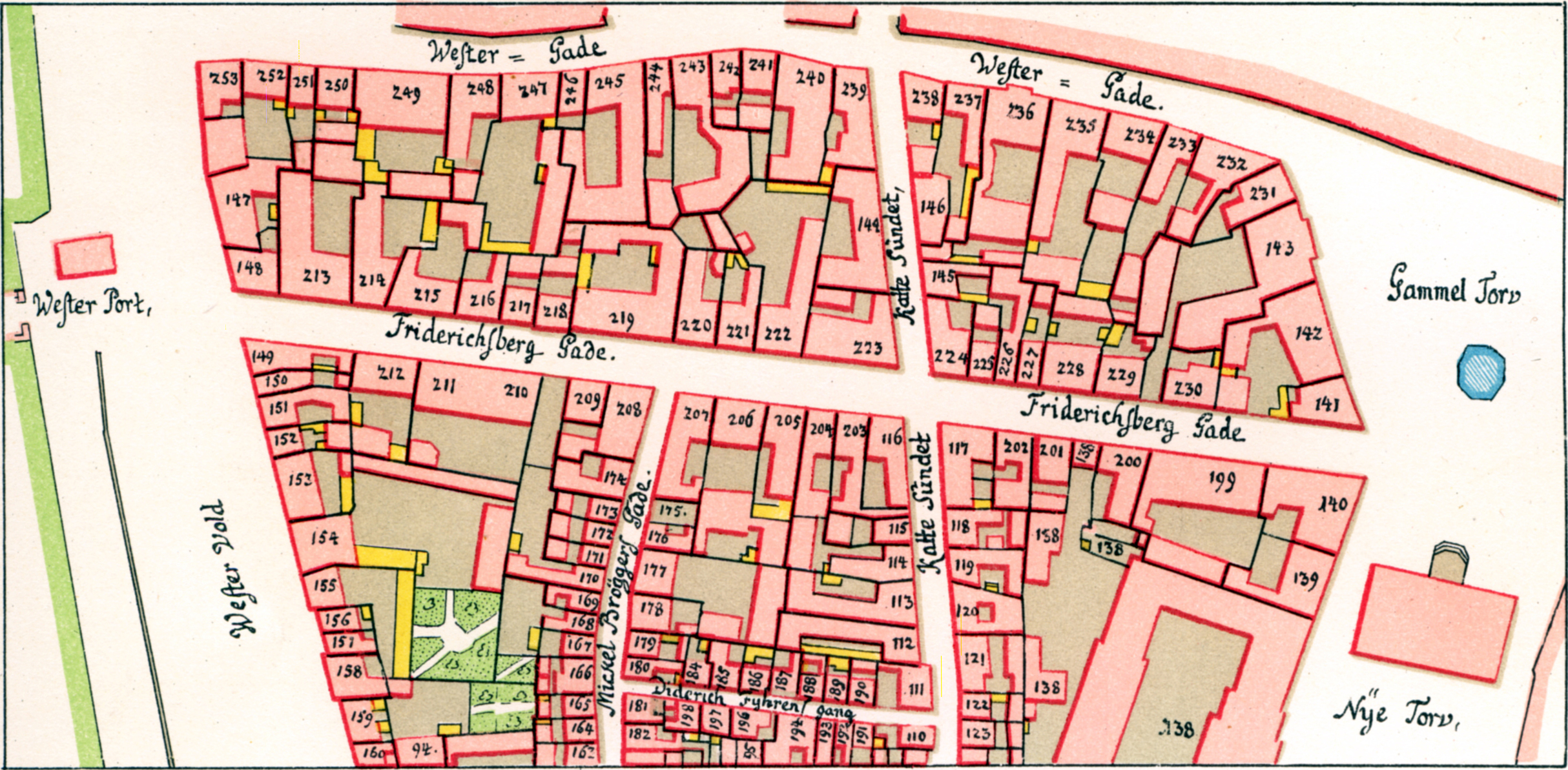
Map of Vester Kvarter after the fire with new cadastre numbers and streets

When the reconstruction of Denmark's capital was begun a number of changes were introduced. A commission was appointed to regulate the streets. After surveyings among the ruins this commission submitted a suggestion to create 12 to 15-metre wide main streets with 10-metre wide side streets with none of the surrounding houses being half-timbered.

This plan was not followed in the reconstruction. Although half-timbered houses were banned at first, the ban was lifted in 1731 as brick houses were considerably more expensive. Medieval Copenhagen, however, had changed permanently when the reconstruction was complete by 1737. Streets and alleys no longer followed the original paths and some even ceased to exist.

=== The fire houses ===
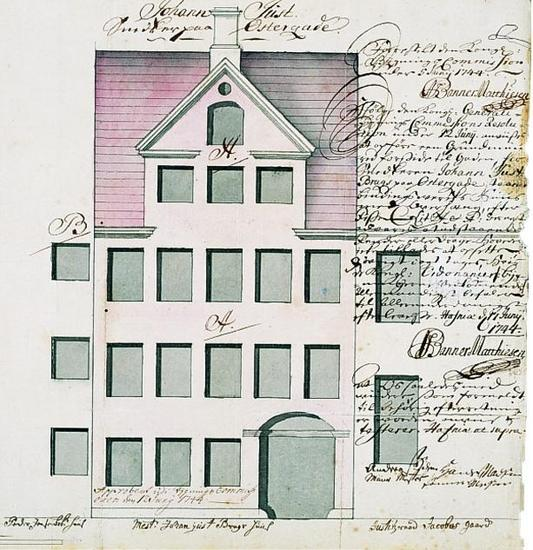
One of Johan Cornelius Krieger's fire houses

The term ildebrandshuse (English: 'fire houses') today refer to a type of townhouses that was built in large numbers in the years immediately after the fire. Many of them were modelled on generic renderings made by Johan Cornelius Krieger with inspiration from Christof Marselis. The houses are two or three storeys high, five bays wide and have a prominent wall dormer. The façade towards the street is in brick while the rest of the house has timber framing. They are typically painted in bright colours. Well-preserved examples are today found in locations such as Gråbrødretorv and Gammel Mønt.

An example of the fire houses can be seen at Gråbrødretorv No. 1–9, for example. An example of an eight-bay fire house is situated at Valkendorfsgade 36.

== See also ==
- Kjøbenhavns Brandforsikring – Denmark's first fire insurance company, established shortly after the fire
