= Fiskebløderhuset =

Building in Copenhagen

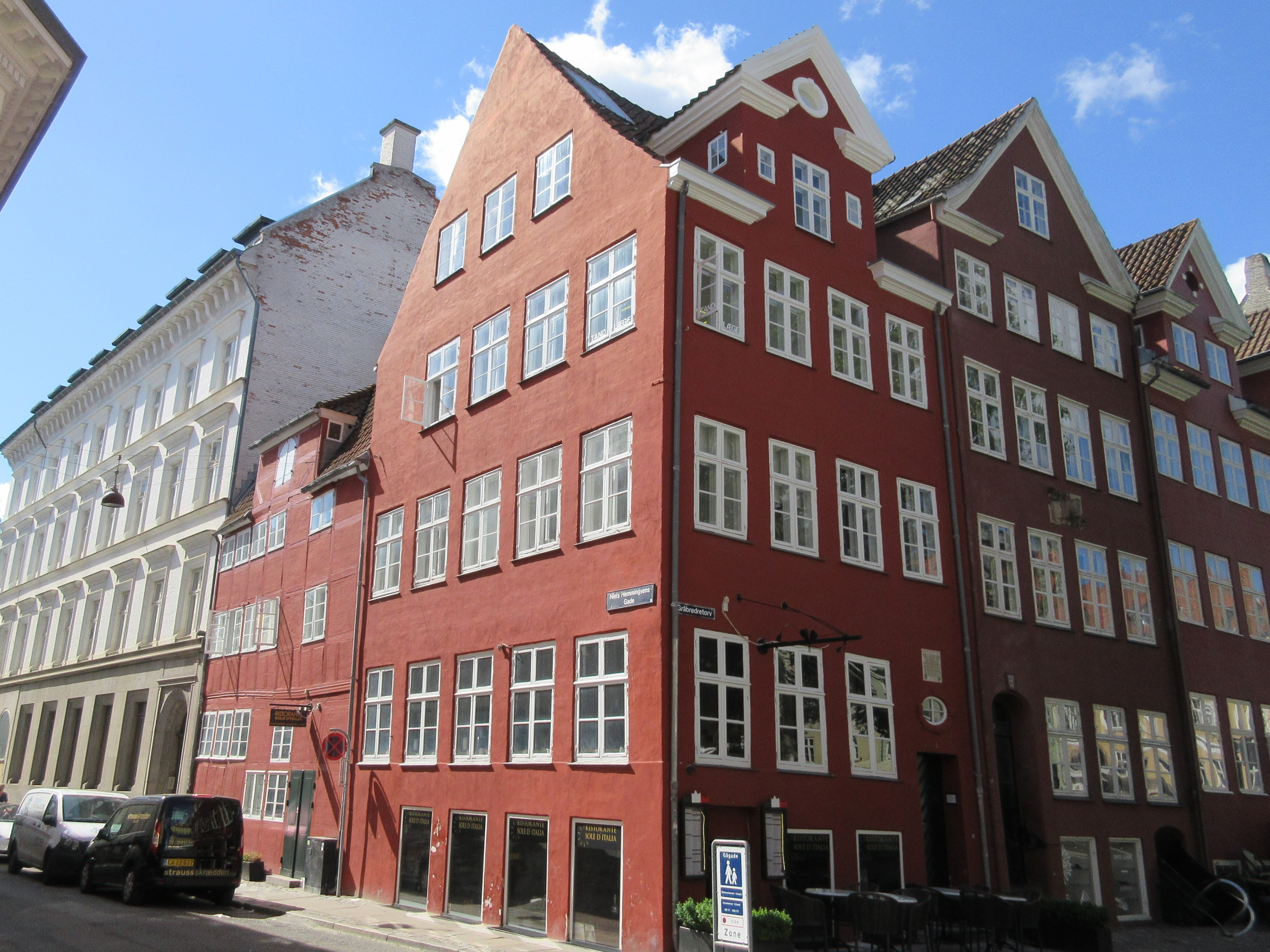

General information
- Location: Copenhagen, Denmark
- Coordinates: 55°40′47.64″N 12°34′35.22″E
- Completed: 1732

Fiskebløderhuset is an 18th-century building situated at the corner of Gråbrødretorv (No. 1) and Niels Hemmingsens Gade (No. 15) in the Old Town of Copenhagen, Denmark. It was listed in the Danish registry of protected buildings and places in 1924. A fiskebløder (lit. 'fish soaker') was a special type of fishmonger, specializing in the soaking and selling of stockfish. Together with the adjacent buildings at Gråbrødretorv No. 3–9, the building is one of the best preserved examples of the so-called "fire houses" which were constructed as part of the rebuilding of the city following the Copenhagen Fire of 1728. A limestone tablet above the main entrance commemorates the fire.

== History ==
=== 18th century ===
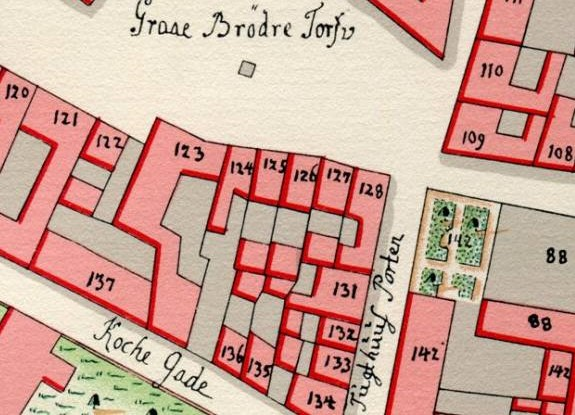
No. 128 seen on a detail from Christian Gedde's map of Frimand's Quarter, 1757.

The property was listed in Copenhagen's first cadastre of 1689 as No. 138 in Frimand's Quarter, owned by one Peder Madsen and rented out. The property was later owned by canvas merchant Johan Danxt. Like most of the other buildings in the area, his house was destroyed in the Copenhagen Fire of 1728. The current building on the site was constructed in 1731–1732 for fiskebløder and beer vendor (øltapper) Hans Lou. A fiskebløder (lit. 'fish soaker') was a special type of fishmonger, specializing in the soaking and selling of stockfish (see also lutefisk).

Hans Lou died at just 40 years old in 1739. His widow Bodil Nielsdatter kept the property. The Fire Insurance Company assessed its value at 2,500 rigsdaler. She later married Christen Hansen Nør. The property was listed as No. 128 (new number) in 1756, still owned by fiskebløder Christen Hansen.

The property and associated fiskebløder business was in 1765 sold to brothers Thomas and Jørgen Jensen Pinvig.

At the time of the 1787 census, the property was home to a total of 14 people distributed among four households. Jørgen Jensen Penvig resided in the building with his wife Ane Rasmus Datter, their two children (aged 11 and 20), a male caretaker and a maid. The second household consisted of canvas merchant Frederick Kismand, his wife Dorethe Chrestine and a maid. The third household consisted of grocer (høker) Jens Jacobsen Weede, his wife Chrestine Jens Datter and a maid. The fourth household consisted of 28-year-old unmarried woman Dorethe Køllert and 17-year-old maid Karen Chrestine.

=== 19th century ===
At the time of the 1801 census, the property was home to a total of 17 people distributed among five households. Christen Nielsen Alling, the owner, a fiskebløder, resided in the building with his wife Mette Cathrine Bertelsen, caretaker Peter Nielsen and maid Birthe Pedersen. Maren Mathiesen Garboe and Maria Arff, two elderly women with pensions, each of them with a maid, were living together in another dwelling. Boel Christine Runberg, an 81-year-old widow, resided in a third dwelling with her 19-year-old granddaughter Jacobine Christine Runberg. A fourth household consisted of tailor Bertel Bertelsen, his wife Gertrud Maria Nyburg and their three-year-old son Mathias Bertelsen. The last household consisted of spækhøker Niels Nielsen Brandt, his wife Maria Larsen, their seven-year-old daughter Cathrine Elisabeth Brandt and the maid Maren Nielsen.

The property was listed as No. 111 in the new cadastre of 1806. It was still owned by fiskebløder Christen Alling. Through marriage with a new owner's daughter, Regine, the property was later transferred to book printer Andreas Nissen. In 1827, he was himself licensed as a fiskebløder. The book dealer and publisher C.A. Reitzel (1789–1853) was among the tenants in 1823.

Andreas Nissen is registered as a tanner (feldbereder) in the 1840 census records. The property was home to a total of 23 people. Nissen resided on the ground floor with his wife Regine Knudsen and two children (aged five and 14). Karen Knudsen, a 68-year-old retailer of ceramics, resided on the ground floor of the side wing with her 31-year-old unmarried daughter and one maid. Carl Carlsen, a master shoemaker, resided on the first floor of the side wing with his brother and fellow shoemaker Christian Carlsen and their sister Sophia Carlsen. Hanne Salomonsen, a 51-year-old widow trader, resided on the second floor of the front wing with a maid. Jacob Thomsen Bøll, a carpenter (snedkersvend), resided on the second floor of the side wing with his wife Karen Bøll née Lovise, their two children (aged four and seven) and his wife Kirstine Oline Bøll. Julius Simonsen Berlin, a building painter resided on the third floor with his wife Sare Ringsteds and a lodger. Ole Olsen, a grocer (høker), resided in the basement with his wife Johanne E.Rosberg and his 17-year-old niece Karen M.Nielsen.

Andreas Nissen was again referred to as a fiskebløder in 1845. He and his wife Regine were still living in the ground-floor apartment with their now four children (aged two to ten) and a maid. Ole Olsen was also still residing in the basement. The new residents included Knud Marcus Knudsen, a master bookbinder, who resided on the first floor with an apprentice.

By 1860, the property was home to 16 people in the front wing and another six people in the side wing. Anders and Regine Nissen were still residing in the ground floor apartment. They lived there with two of their children, Regine Nissen's cousin Sophie Frederikke Sneider and one maid. The master shoemaker Jens Lassen was still living on the second floor. He lived there with an unmarried daughter, a lodger and one of Andreas and Regine Nissen's sons. Jens Christian Christensen, a grocer (høker), was now residing in the basement with his wife Ane Larsen, their eight-year-old daughter and a maid. Rasmus Herman Nissen, a 34-year-old unmarried master bookbinder, resided alone on the first floor.

=== 20th century ===
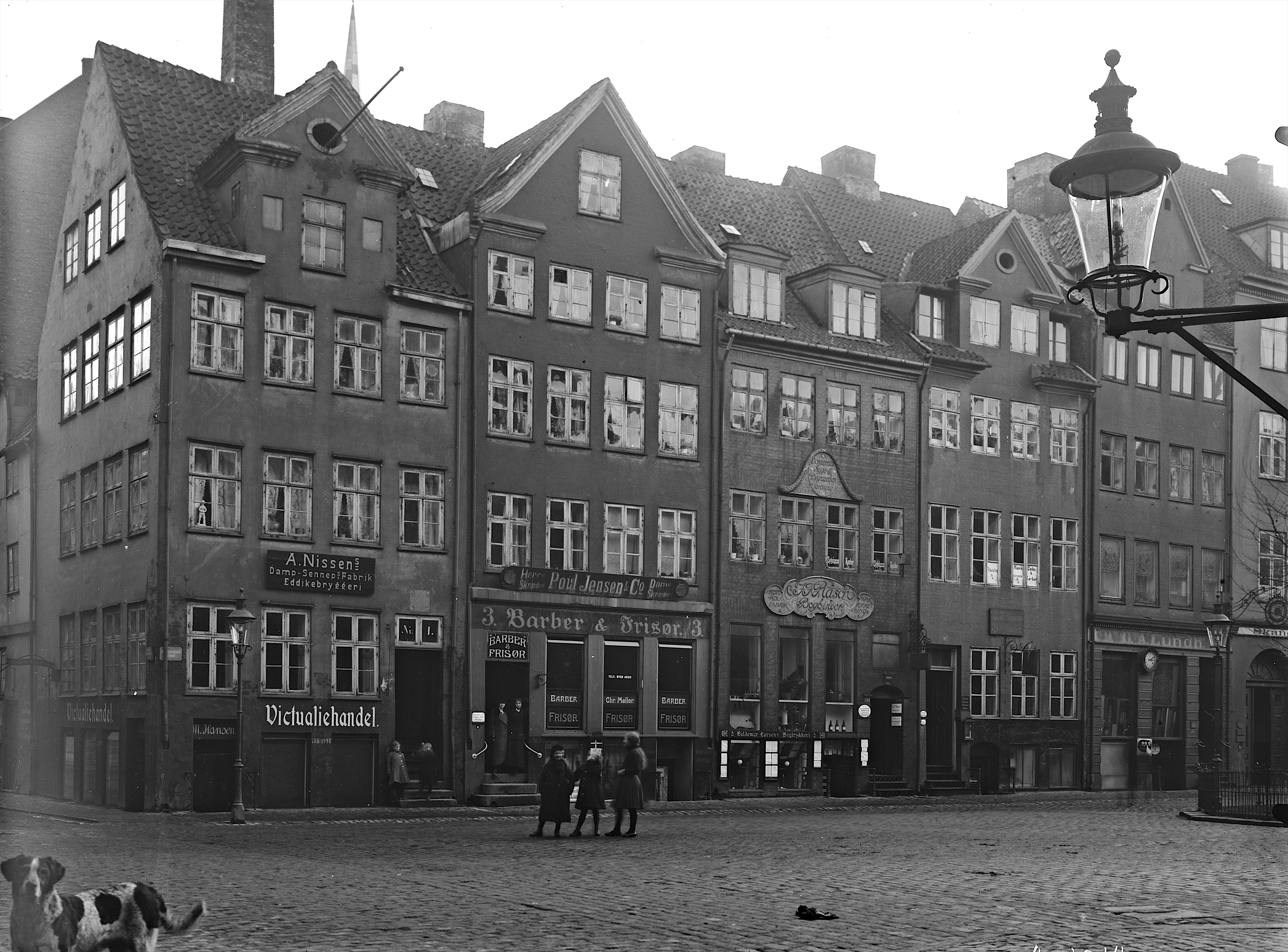
The building in January 1914: The sign on the facade reads: "A. Nissen's Mustard and Vinegar Brewery".

At the time of the 1906 census, the property was home to a total of 14 people. Anders Knud Nissen, a manufacturer of mustard and vinegar, resided on the ground floor with his wife Agnes Nissen and three servants. Sofie Elisabeth Hansen and Thora Laura Reinholdine Smith, a 22-year-old female bookkeeper and a 39-year-old widow, resided on the second floor with one maid. Christian Julius Jaten, a paper hanger, resided alone on the third floor. Niels Olsen, a grocer (høker) resided in the basement with his wife Christine Marie Olsen, their two sons (aged 12 and 19) and one maid.

== Architecture ==
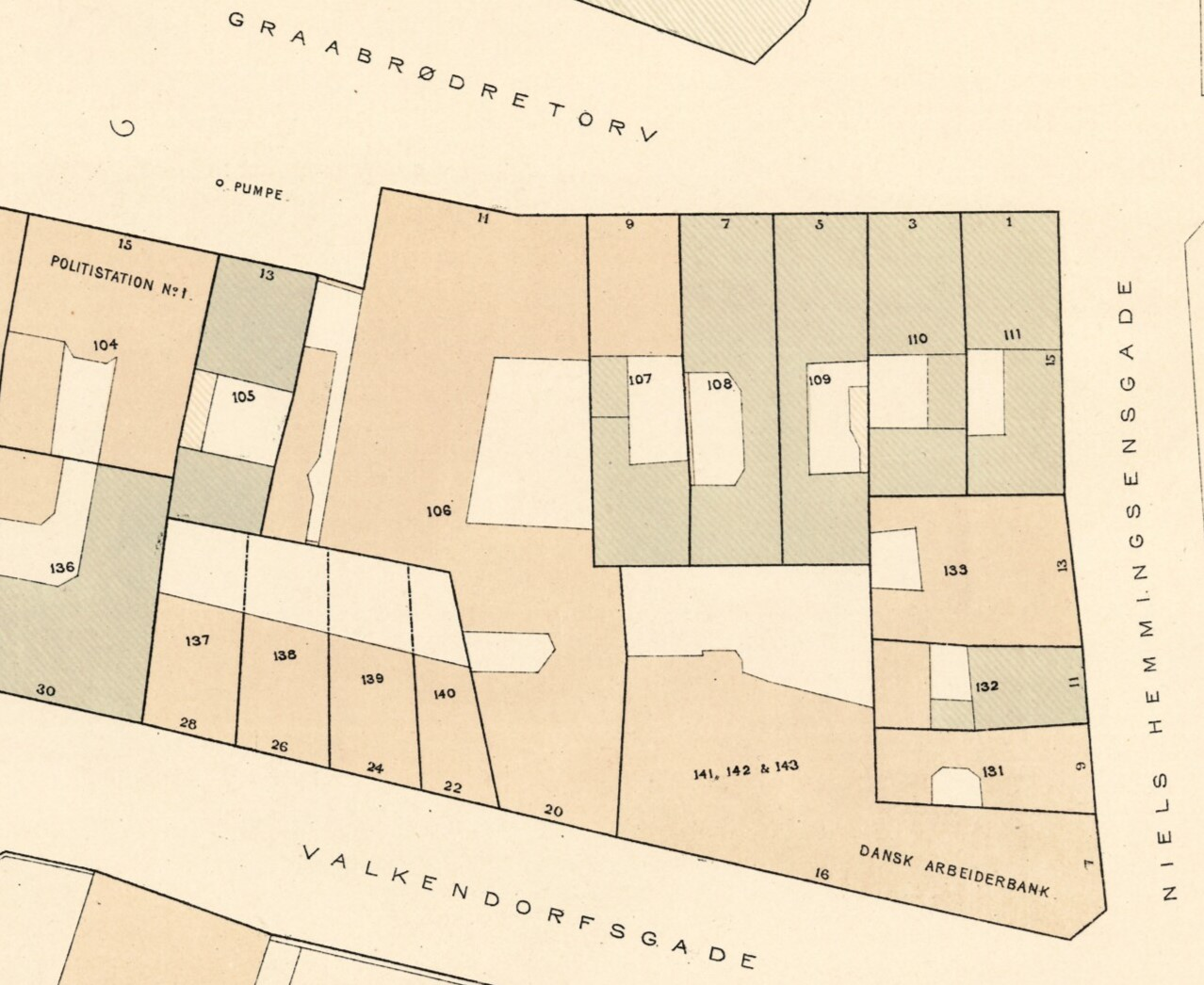
Gråbrødretorv 1 seen on a detail from one of Berggreen's block plans of Frimand's Quarter, 1886-1888.

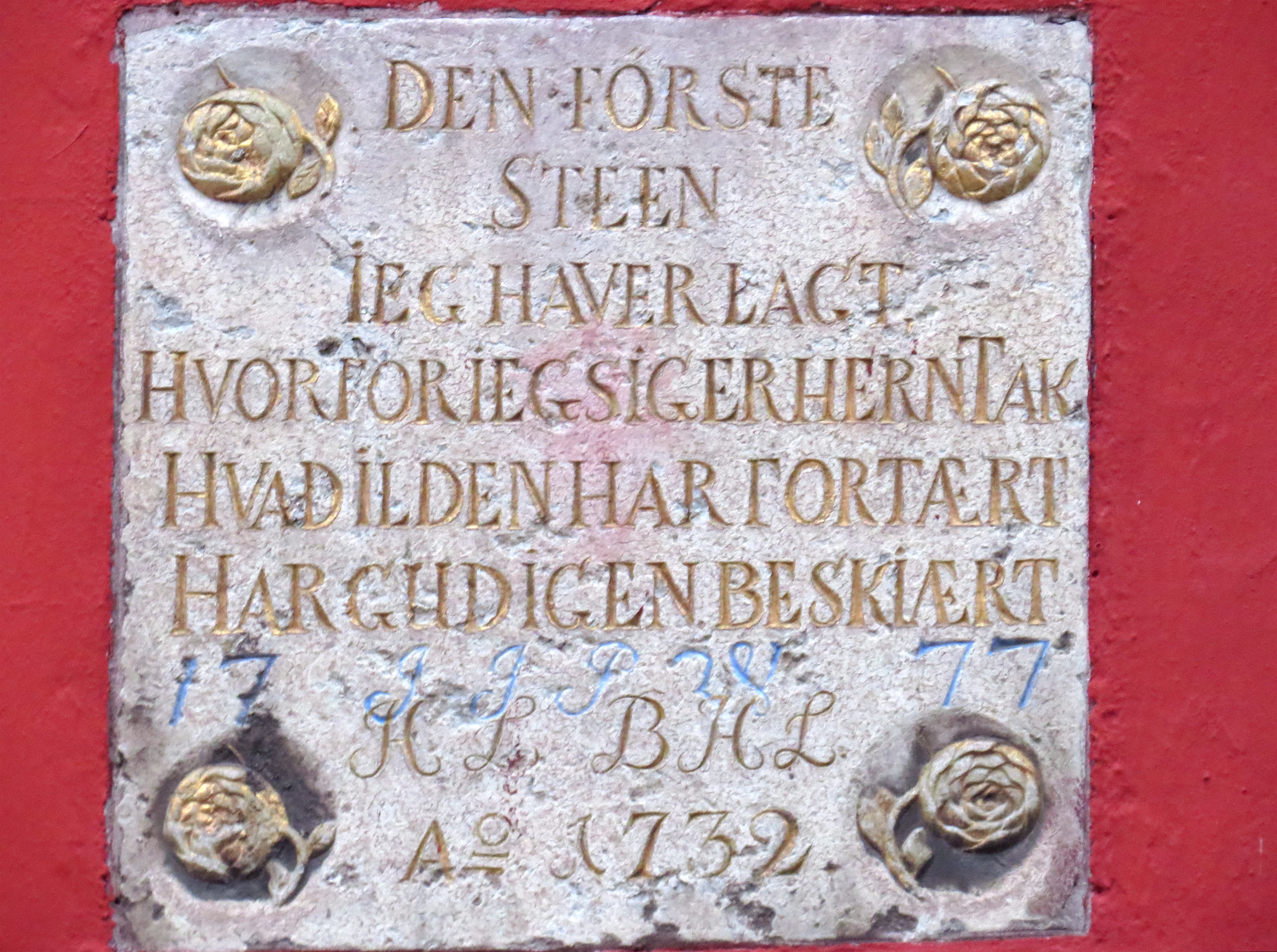
The stone tablet above the main entrance.

The building consists of a four-bay-wide main wing fronting Gråbrødretorv (No. 1), a seven-bay-long perpendicular wing on Niels Hemmingsens Gade (No. 1) and a rear wing, surrounding three sides of a narrow courtyard. The front wing is constructed with three storeys over a walk-out basement. It is built in brick towards the street and with timber framing towards the courtyard and neighboring properties. The facade is crowned by a substantial gabled wall dormer with cornice returns. The main entrance in the bay furthest to the right is topped by an oval window and a limestone tablet commemorating the Great Fire of 1728. The inscription reads "The first stone that I have laid / Why I thank the Lord / What the fire has consumed / God has returned / HL BHL / Ao 1732" ("DEN FÖRSTE / STEEN / JEG HAVER LAGT / HVORFOR JEG SIGER HERN TAK / HVAD ILDEN HAR FORTÆRT / HAR GUD IGEN BESKIÆRT / HL BHL / Ao 1732").

The stone tablet was already installed by Hans Lou in connection with the construction of the building in 1732. Later owner Jørgen Jensen Pinvig added his own initials. A basement entrance is located in the bay furthest to the left. The timber-framed perpendicular wing on Niels Hemmingsens Gade is also constructed with three storeys over a walk-out basement basement but with considerably lower floor heights than the main wing. Its seven-bay facade is crowned by a three-bay wall dormer. The front wing and perpendicular wing are both rendered in a dark red colour towards the street and finished with black-painted timber framing and yellow infills towards the yard. The rear wing is constructed with white-painted timber framing and white infills.

== Today ==
The property was owned by APS Kompl Selsk København Centrum in 2008. A restaurant with outdoor service is located in the basement. The upper floors are all used as office space.

== Gallery ==
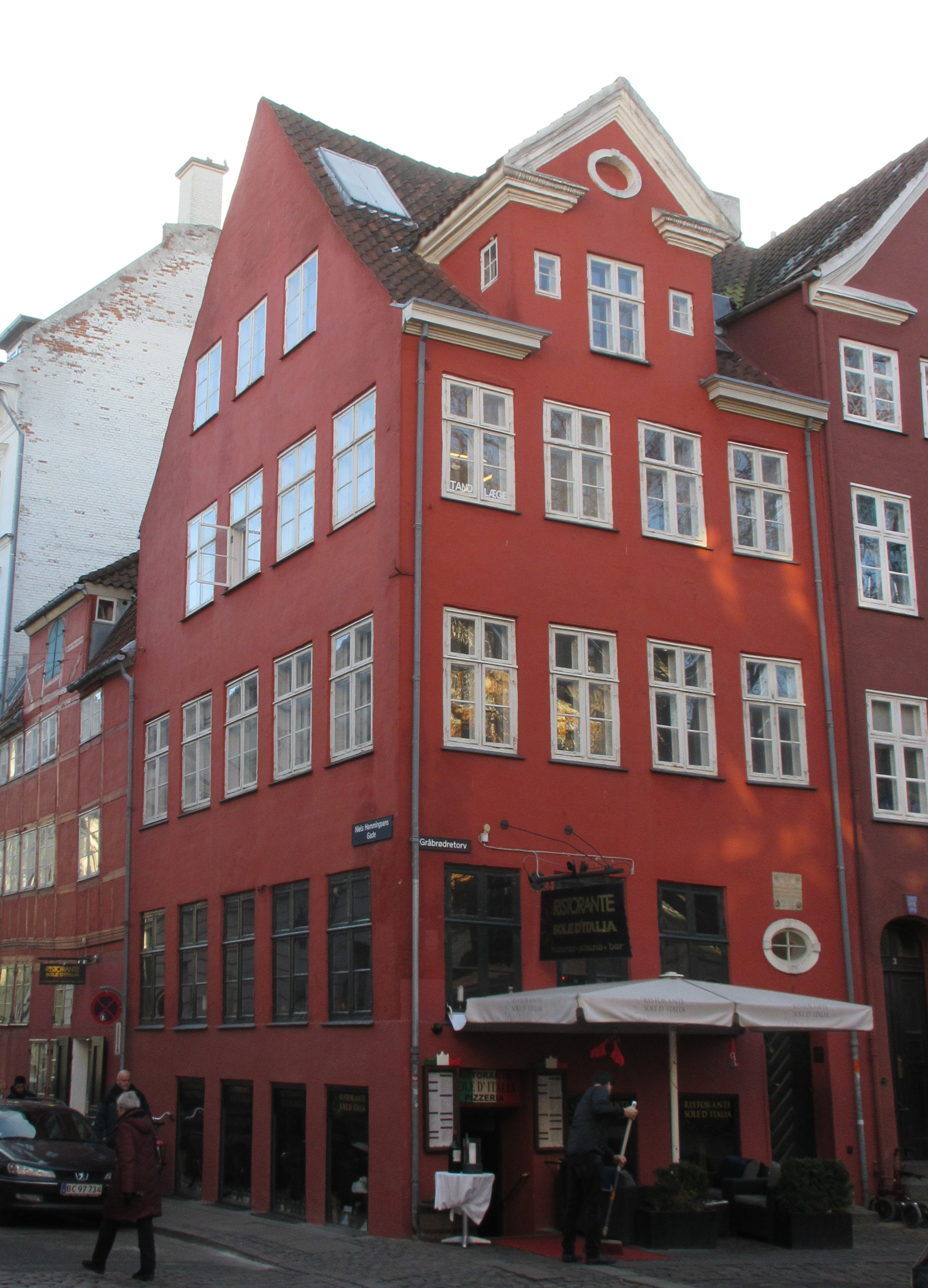

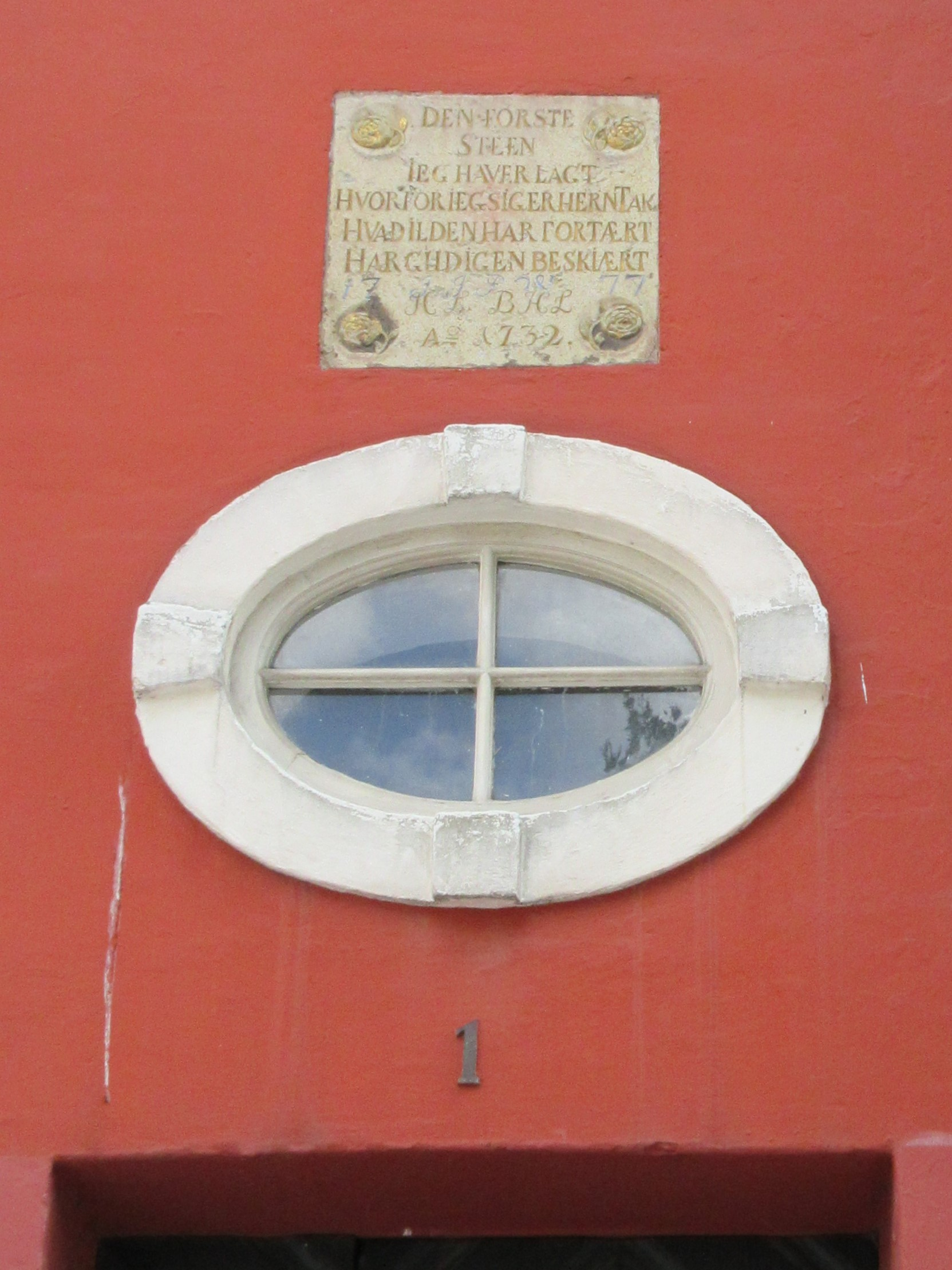
