= Sales (disambiguation) =

Sales are the activities involved in selling products or services. See also Sales (accounting), operating revenues earned by a company when it sells its products.

Sales may also refer to:

- Sales (surname), a list of people so named
- Sales, São Paulo, a municipality in the state of São Paulo, Brazil
- Sales, Haute-Savoie, a village and commune in the Haute-Savoie département, France
  - Château de Sales, a ruined castle
- Sales (Colunga), a parish in the province of Asturias, Spain
- Sâles, a municipality in the canton of Fribourg, Switzerland
- Sâles (Gruyère), a former municipality in the canton of Fribourg, Switzerland
- Sales, Sarine, a village in the canton of Fribourg, Switzerland

== Music ==
- Record sales
- SALES (band), a band from Orlando, Florida

== See also ==
- Salesians, a religious order named after Francis de Sales
- Sale (disambiguation)
- Salesman (disambiguation)
