= Saly (name) =

Saly is a name. Notable people with the name include:

- Saly Greige (born 1989), Lebanese beauty pageant titleholder
- Jacques Saly (1717–1776), French-born sculptor
- Julia Saly, Spanish film actress and producer

== See also ==
- Sally (disambiguation)
- Sale (disambiguation)

Saly is the real name of Salar Saeb Nia, an Iranian composer and singer
