= Salie =

Salie is a surname. Notable people with the surname include:

- Faith Salie (born 1971), American journalist, writer, actress, comedian, television, radio host and Rhodes scholar
- Tawfeeq Salie (born 1991), South African footballer

== See also ==
- Sale (surname)
