= Amalienborg Square, Copenhagen =

Painting by Vilhelm Hammershøi

- Artist: Vilhelm Hammershøi
- Year: 1896
- Medium: Oil on canvas
- Dimensions: 136.5 cm × 136.5 cm (53.7 in × 53.7 in)
- Location: Statens Museum for Kunst, Copenhagen

Amalienborg Square, Copenhagen (Amalienborg Plads) is an 1896 oil-on-canvas painting by the Danish artist Vilhelm Hammershøi in the Statens Museum for Kunst.

This painting shows Amalienborg Square, Copenhagen in a hazy setting with full sunlight on the 1768 Neoclassical statue of Frederik V on Horseback, commissioned by the Asiatic Company and created by the French sculptor Jacques Saly. This statue took 14 years to complete and cost more than Amalienborg's four palatial buildings which surround it, which is perhaps why Hammershøi decided to place it in full sunlight. The lack of any trace of human life in the painting is typical of Hammershøi's work and emphasizes the monumental qualities of the subject. The skewed architectural lines give the painting a sense of space and the horseman seems to be trotting calmly out of the painting, leaving the two-dimensional palace behind him. The trompe l'oeil effect makes the painting seem taller, but it is actually square.

Other monumental paintings of architecture by Hammershøi in this period were:

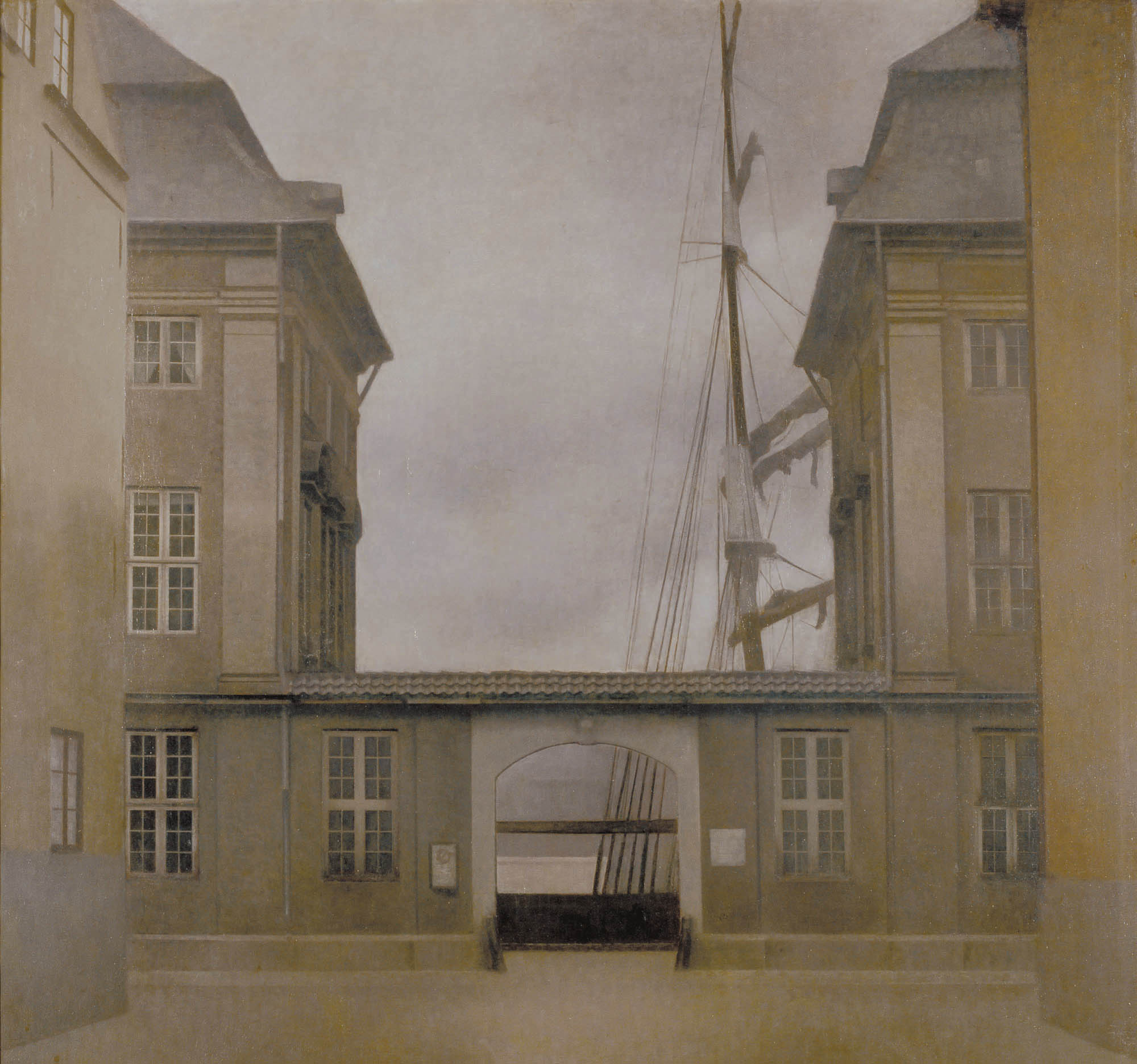
The Old Buildings of the Asiatic Company, 1902

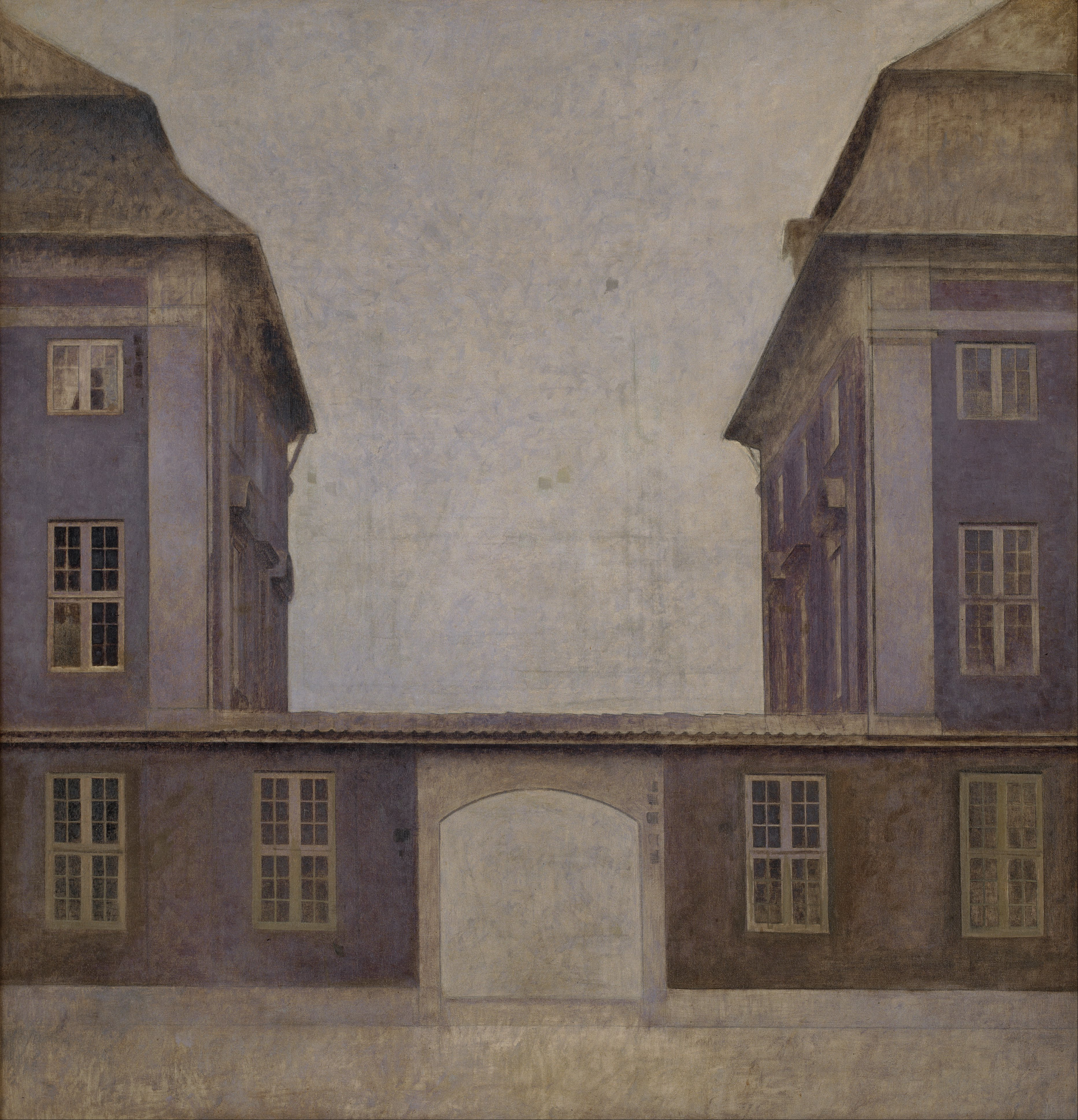
The Buildings of the Asiatic Company, seen from St. Annæ Street, 1902

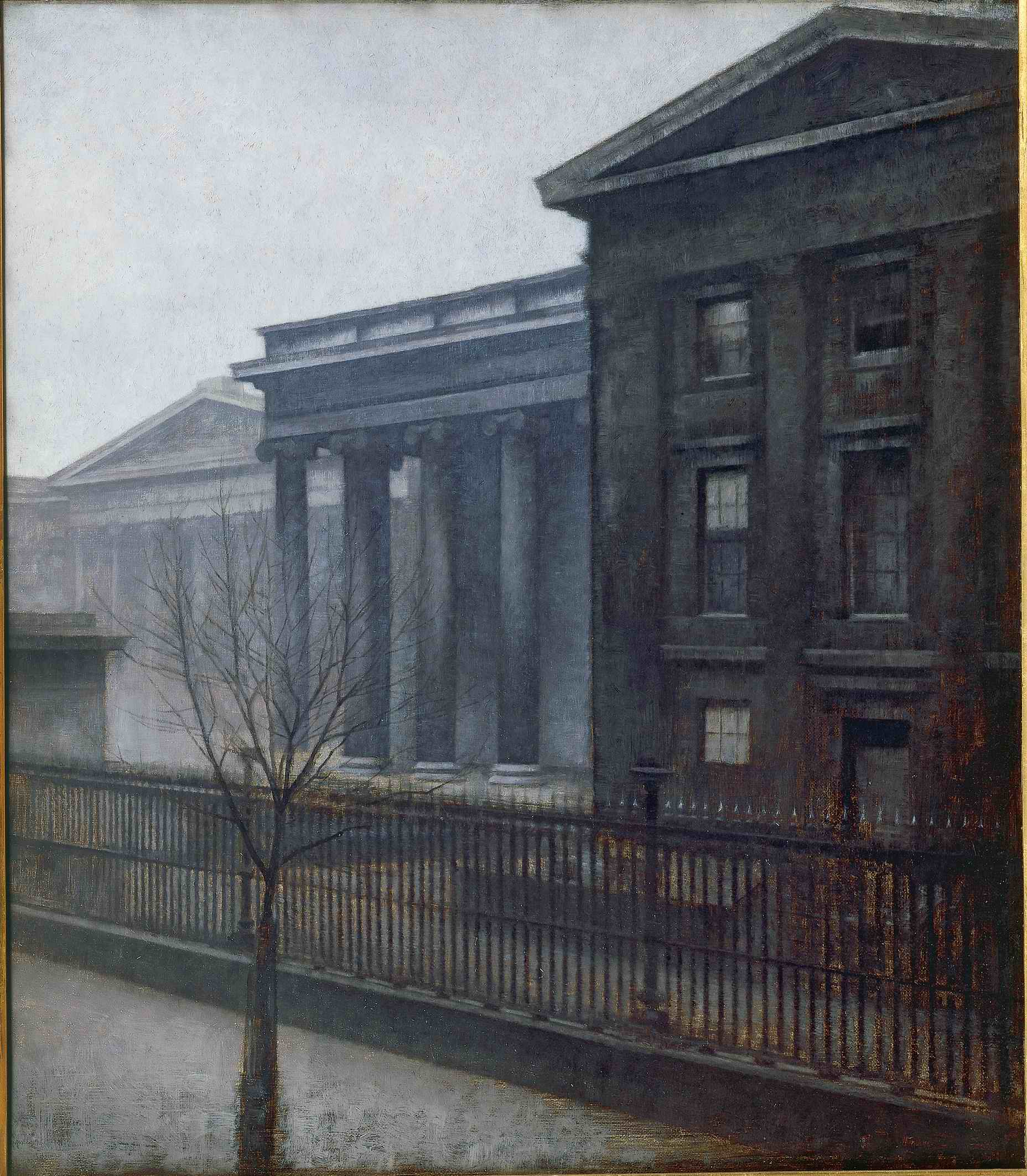
British Museum, 1906

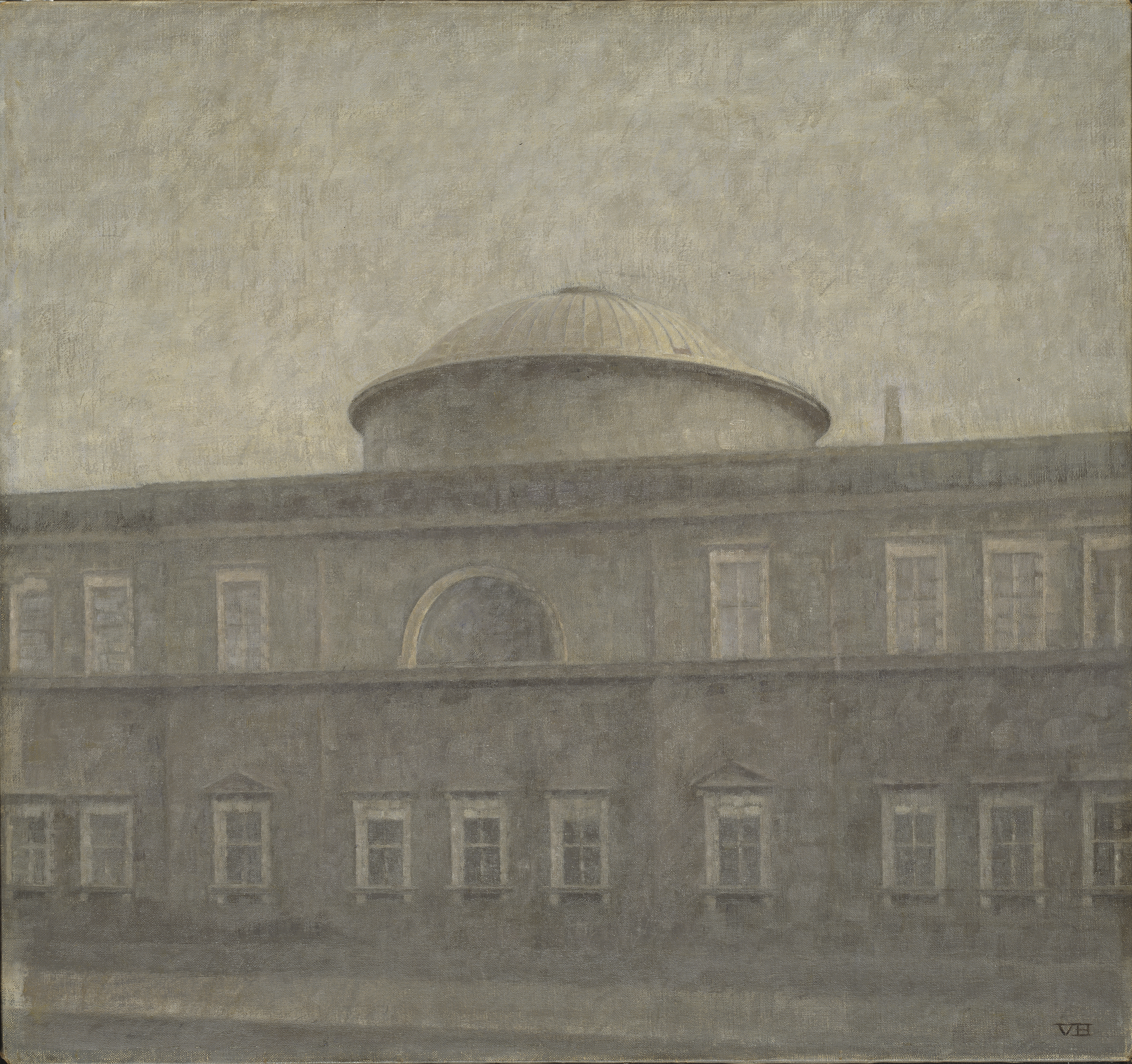
The Royal Palace Church in Copenhagen, 1910
