= Sale (surname) =

Sale is a surname. Notable people with the surname include:

- Albert Sale (1850–1874), US Army soldier and Medal of Honor recipient
- Charles "Chic" Sale (1885–1936), American vaudeville performer
- Chris Sale (born 1989), American Major League Baseball pitcher
- Dick Sale (1919–1987), English schoolmaster and cricketer
- Florentia Sale (1790–1853), English writer
- Forest Sale (1911–1985), American collegiate basketball player and politician
- Freddy Sale (1902–1956), American baseball pitcher
- George Sale (1697–1736), English orientalist and solicitor
- George Sale (academic) (1831–1922), New Zealand newspaper editor, gold miner, public administrator and university professor
- Howard Julian Sale, Canadian politician
- Jamie Salé (born 1977), Canadian pairs figure skater
- John Bernard Sale (1779–1856), English organist, son of John Sale
- John Sale (singer) (1758–1827), English singer
- Kirkpatrick Sale (born 1937), American environmental and human ecology scholar and author
- Mahamat Paba Salé (born 1950), Cameroonian diplomat
- Mark Sale (born 1972), English former footballer
- Ned Sale (1883–1918), New Zealand cricketer, father of Scott Sale
- Niu Sale (born 1969), American football player
- Richard Sale (director) (1911–1993), American screenwriter and film director
- Robert Sale (1782–1845, British Army major general
- Sale (Berkshire cricketer) (fl. 1791–1793), English cricketer
- Scott Sale (1915–1991), New Zealand cricketer, son of Ned Sale
- Ted Sale (1871–1920), English cricketer
- Tim Sale (artist) (1956–2022), American comic book artist
- Tim Sale (politician) (born 1942), Canadian politician
- Tommy Sale (1910–1990), English footballer
- Tommy Sale (rugby league) (1918–2016), English rugby league player
- Tony Sale (1931–2011), English computer hardware engineer and historian of computing
- Virginia Sale (1899–1992), American character actress

== See also ==
- Sales (surname)
- Sarles (surname)
