= James Duncan Lawrence =

James Duncan Lawrence may refer to:

- James Lawrence (New Zealand cricketer)
- James Duncan Lawrence (author)
