= Sale =

Sale often refers to:

- Sales, the exchange of goods for profits
- Discounts and allowances in the prices of goods

Sale or The Sale may also refer to:

== Places ==
- Sale (Thrace), an ancient Greek city
- Republic of Salé, a 17th-century corsair city-state on the Moroccan coast
- Sale, Victoria, a city in Australia
  - Sale railway station, Victoria
- Sale, Greater Manchester, a town in England
- Sale, Piedmont, a commune in Italy
- Salé, a city in Morocco
- Sale, Myanmar, a city
- Şäle, also transliterated Shali, Republic of Tatarstan, a village in Russia
- Sale (Tanzanian ward)
- Sale Island, Canada

== People ==
- Sale (surname)
- Sale Ngahkwe (c. 875–934), a king of the Pagan dynasty of Burma

== Other uses ==
- BOC Aviation, formerly Singapore Aircraft Leasing Enterprise (SALE)
- Sale (chain store), a grocery store chain in Finland
- Sale Sharks, a rugby union club based in Greater Manchester, England
- The Sale (pub), a listed public house in Greater Manchester
- The Sale (album), by the American progressive rock band Crack the Sky
- The Sale (film), a 2014 Iranian social drama film

== See also ==
- Sales (disambiguation)
- Sail (disambiguation)
