= Sail (disambiguation) =

A sail is any type of surface intended to move a vessel, vehicle or rotor by being placed in a wind.

Sail or SAIL may also refer to:

== Arts and entertainment ==
- "A Sail", a poem by Mikhail Lermontov
- Sail (novel), a 2008 mystery novel by James Patterson
- Sails (album), an album by Chet Atkins
- "Sails" (song), a 2019 song by Mot & Zivert
- "Sails", a 1969 song by Elton John from the album Empty Sky
- "Sail" (song), a 2011 song by Awolnation
- Sails Tails, an animated character from the television series Sonic Prime
- SAIL, Steel Authority of India Limited, a PSU in India involved in Iron and Steel Making.

== Device ==
- Windmill sail, the wind-catching panel or cloth section that provides power to a windmill
- Sail (submarine), the tower-like structure on the topside of submarines

== Language ==
- Sail (hieroglyph), an Egyptian language determinative
- Sail (letter), a letter of the Ogham alphabet

== Places ==
- Sail, an administrative district of Pekanbaru, Riau, Indonesia
- SAIL High School, a public high school in Tallahassee, Florida
- Sail (Lake District), a hill in the English Lake District

== Science and technology ==
- Sail (anatomy), a fin-like extension from the back of some animals
- SAIL (cable system) (South Atlantic Inter Link), a submarine cable connecting Cameroon to Brazil
- Shuttle Avionics Integration Laboratory, a facility at Lyndon B. Johnson Space Center in Houston, Texas, US

=== Computing ===
- Stanford Artificial Intelligence Laboratory
  - SAIL (programming language), created at the laboratory
- Storage and Inference Layer, a RDF4J database implementation, home to RDF repositories
- Sails.js, a web framework for the Node.js runtime environment

== Other uses ==
- Steel Authority of India Limited (SAIL), a steel maker in India
- Chevrolet Sail, a hatchback car
- SAIL Amsterdam, a maritime event

== See also ==
- Sale (disambiguation)
- Solar sail
