= Sales (surname) =

Sales (Portuguese pronunciation: ['salis] or ['saliʃ]) is a Portuguese-language surname of French roots (derived from Francis de Sales, a bishop and Catholic saint, member of the noble Sales family of the Duchy of Savoy), common in Portugal and Brazil (with an archaic alternative spelling, Salles).

This surname can be English, from Middle English salwes (sallows), a topographic name for someone who lived by a group of sallow trees.

Other variants are Spanish (Asturian-Leonese) and Catalan. The origins are habitational names from any of the places called Sales, like Sales de Llierca (Catalonia) or Sales (Asturies), from the plural of Sala.

Sales may refer to:

- Arlete Salles (born 1938), Brazilian actress
- Arthur Sales (footballer, born 1900), (1900–1977) English footballer
- Arnaldo de Oliveira Sales, Hong Kong businessman and sports administrator
- Campos Sales (1841–1913), Brazilian politician and president
- Charles de Sales (1626–66), French soldier, governor of Saint Christophe
- Daniel Sales (born 2006), Brazilian footballer
- David Sales (born 1977), English cricketer
- Edu Sales (born 1977), Brazilian footballer
- Eugênio de Araújo Sales (1920–2012), Brazilian cardinal
- Fernando Sales (born 1977), Spanish footballer
- Francis de Sales (1567–1622), Catholic saint
- Francis De Sales (actor) (1912–1988), American actor
- Hayley Sales (born 1986), American singer-songwriter
- Hunt Sales (born 1954), American rock and roll drummer, brother of Tony Sales
- João Francisco de Sales (born 1986), Brazilian footballer
- Leigh Sales (born 1973), Australian journalist
- Liz Sales, American artist
- Luis Sales (1745–1807), Spanish missionary
- Luiz Fernando Corrêa Sales (born 1988), Brazilian footballer
- Nancy Jo Sales (born 1964), American journalist
- Nykesha Sales (born 1976), American basketball player
- Ruby Sales (born 1948), American social activist
- Scott Sales (born 1960), American politician
- Simone Sales (born 1988), Italian footballer
- Soupy Sales (1926–2009), American comedian
- Thiago Sales (born 1987), Brazilian footballer
- Thomas Sales (1868–1926), Canadian politician
- Tony Sales (born 1951), American rock musician, brother of Hunt Sales
- Wayne Sales (born 1949), Canadian businessman

== See also ==
- Sale (surname)
