= Joachim Wasserschlebe =

German-Danish politician

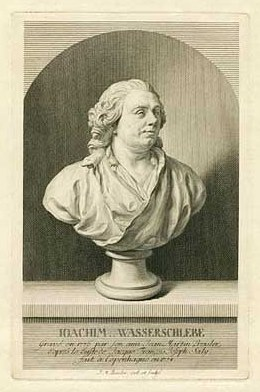
Joachim Wasserschlebe, in an engraving by Johan Martin Preisler after a lost bust by Jacques Saly.

Joachim Wasserschlebe (1 May 1709, Salzwedel, Margraviate of Brandenburg - 13 March 1787, Wassersleben estates) was a German-Danish diplomat, politician, councillor, patron of the arts and art collector.
