= Scott Sale =

New Zealand cricketer (1915–1991)

- Scott Sale in 1937

Personal information
- Full name: Vernon Scott Sale
- Born: 13 June 1915; Auckland, New Zealand
- Died: 4 January 1991 (aged 75); Auckland, New Zealand
- Batting: Right-handed
- Bowling: Right-arm medium
- Relatives: Ned Sale (father)

Domestic team information
- Years: Team
- 1934/35–1939/40: Auckland

Career statistics
Competition	First-class
Matches	11
Runs scored	531
Batting average	33.18
100s/50s	1/2
Top score	106
Balls bowled	64
Wickets	1
Bowling average	30.00
5 wickets in innings	0
10 wickets in match	0
Best bowling	1/2
Catches/stumpings	4/0
- Source: CricketArchive, 19 January 2015

Vernon Scott Sale (13 June 1915 – 4 January 1991) was a New Zealand cricketer who played first-class cricket for Auckland from 1934 to 1940.

== Life and career ==
Scott Sale was born in Auckland. When he was three years old, his father, the New Zealand cricketer Ned Sale, died in the influenza epidemic of 1918.

Sale was educated at Takapuna Grammar School. Aged 17 and while still at school, he made his first century in senior Auckland cricket in November 1932. In the corresponding round two years later he scored 220 in just under four hours.

Sale made his first-class debut in the 1934–35 season. In his second match he came to the crease with Auckland at 252 for 7 in reply to Otago's 278; he made 65 and Auckland totalled 450. He was selected for North Island in the match against South Island at the end of the season and made 16 and 43. However, he appeared in only two first-class matches in the next three seasons.

After serving as twelfth man in the first match of the 1938–39 Plunket Shield, Sale returned to the Auckland team for the second and third matches. Auckland won both matches, and the Shield. In the first match he made 106 (batting at number eight) and 43 not out against Otago. The "diminutive Aucklander" scored his century in 115 minutes of "confident and beautifully timed stroke play". Later that year, on Christmas Day, during the match against Auckland he made 97, the highest score in the match, "a masterly innings lasting 135 minutes" with "powerful off and cover drives, and brilliant hook and pull shots".

After the 1939–40 season, when Auckland won the Plunket Shield and Sale was singled out in The Cricketer as a batsman of "considerable promise", World War II curtailed cricket in New Zealand, and Sale played no more first-class cricket. He umpired two first-class matches in 1947-48 and 1948–49.

He was also a football player. He married Rona Dickey in December 1940. He worked in banking.
