= James Lawrence (New Zealand cricketer) =

New Zealand cricketer

Personal information
- Full name: James Duncan Lawrence
- Born: 11 March 1867; Ferrymead, Canterbury, New Zealand
- Died: 21 June 1946 (aged 79); Christchurch, New Zealand
- Batting: Right-handed

Domestic team information
- Years: Team
- 1891/92–1906/07: Canterbury

Career statistics
Competition	First-class
Matches	31
Runs scored	1,124
Batting average	21.61
100s/50s	1/4
Top score	167
Balls bowled	798
Wickets	9
Bowling average	38.33
5 wickets in innings	0
10 wickets in match	0
Best bowling	2/15
Catches/stumpings	12/–
- Source: CricketArchive, 27 September 2014

James Duncan Lawrence (11 March 1867 – 21 June 1946) was a cricketer who played first-class cricket for Canterbury from 1892 to 1907, and played three times for New Zealand in the days before New Zealand played Test cricket.

== Early career ==
A "small, thin and wiry" batsman, Lawrence made his first-class debut in 1891–92, but scored only 27 runs in his first four matches over two seasons.

== Partnership record ==
In Canterbury's first match of the 1893–94 season, Lawrence opened the batting for the first time. Auckland batted first and were dismissed for 157. At 2.45 on the first day Lawrence and Len Cuff went to the wicket to open for Canterbury, and when a short tea interval was taken three hours later both men had scored centuries. Cuff was out to the last ball of the day, making the Canterbury score at stumps 306 for one wicket, scored in three and a half hours of play. Cuff's 176 set a new record for New Zealand first-class cricket, beating George Watson's 175 in 1880–81. Lawrence was out early the next day for 167. Cuff's and Lawrence's centuries were only the fourth and fifth in the 30-year history of New Zealand first-class cricket. Their partnership was the highest partnership in New Zealand first-class cricket, and it remained the first-wicket record for New Zealand for 57 years. William Robertson took 14 wickets on his first-class debut, and Canterbury won the match by an innings and 156 runs.

Lawrence (along with Cuff and Robertson) was selected in New Zealand's first match, against New South Wales a month later, but Lawrence made only 6 and 3 and New Zealand lost.

== Later career ==
Lawrence scored only one more fifty in the next 12 seasons. However, in 1906–07, his last season, he scored 289 runs at an average of 36.12 – more runs than any other New Zealand batsman. He made 61 and 37 not out in a victory for Canterbury over MCC and 60 and 26 not out in a victory over Wellington, and was selected to open for New Zealand in the two-match series against MCC, which were his last two first-class matches. He scored 18 and 51 in the first match, putting on 112 for the first wicket with Ned Sale, and his career ended a few days later on his 40th birthday when New Zealand beat MCC by 56 runs in Wellington to square the series.

He later coached the cricket team at Christ's College, Christchurch, while he worked as the Christchurch manager for the New Zealand drug company Sharland and Co.
