= Ned Sale =

New Zealand cricketer (1883–1918)

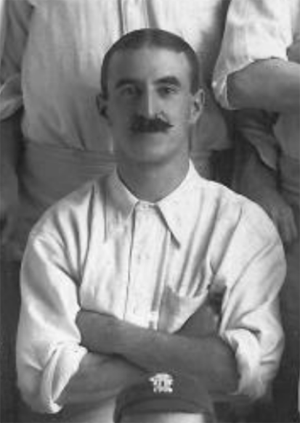

Personal information
- Full name: Edmund Vernon Sale
- Born: 6 July 1883; Taunton, England
- Died: 16 November 1918 (aged 35); Auckland, New Zealand
- Batting: Right-handed
- Relatives: Scott Sale (son)

Domestic team information
- Years: Team
- 1894/95–1914/15: Auckland

Career statistics
Competition	First-class
Matches	23
Runs scored	1,012
Batting average	25.94
100s/50s	2/4
Top score	121
Balls bowled	30
Wickets	2
Bowling average	11.00
5 wickets in innings	0
10 wickets in match	0
Best bowling	2/7
Catches/stumpings	17/1
- Source: CricketArchive, 15 October 2014

Edmund Vernon "Ned" Sale (6 July 1883 – 16 November 1918) was a New Zealand cricketer who played first-class cricket for Auckland from 1905 to 1915, and played four times for New Zealand in the days before New Zealand played Test cricket.

== Cricket career ==
A middle-order batsman and superb fieldsman, Ned Sale played one match for Auckland in 1904–05, and none in 1905–06. Playing for his club Parnell in January 1906, he made a record score for Auckland senior cricket of 284 in four hours out of a team total of 411. He was reasonably successful in two matches for Auckland against the touring MCC in 1906-07, and was selected for both of New Zealand's matches against the MCC at the end of the tour. In the first he opened in the second innings and made 66 in 90 minutes, putting on 112 for the first wicket with James Lawrence, but it was not enough to prevent defeat. In the second match he was less successful with the bat, but took a brilliant catch at a crucial stage in the MCC's second innings: "running across from mid-off [Sale] took the ball sideways with one hand, a wonderful catch, of a sort that is not seen once in a thousand times". New Zealand went on to win by 56 runs and square the series.

The Free Lance said of his fielding after the victory over the MCC: "As a fieldsman ... Sale is as good as we have seen on the Basin Reserve for many a day. He covers a tremendous lot of ground, has a fine safe pair of hands, and picks up the ball cleanly every time. It stopped the Englishmen whenever they noticed Sale getting over the ground to intercept the ball in its flight." When the Australians toured in 1909–10 and played New Zealand, the speed and cleanness of his fielding and his returns to the wicket were remarked upon as an example to other New Zealand cricketers.

In 1909–10 Sale scored 121 for Auckland against Otago, a match in which he also kept wicket. His only first-class match in 1913–14 was the second of the two matches New Zealand played against the touring Australians. In the first innings, going to the wicket with the score at 40 for 4, he played "clean, hard strokes all round the wicket" and made 109 not out in three and a half hours out of a team total of 269. He was only the second person to score a century for New Zealand in a first-class match, after Dan Reese.

== Football career ==
Sale also played association football. He captained the Auckland team in 1909.

== Personal life ==
Sale was a dentist in Auckland. He married Ivy Burgess in Devonport in February 1914. He died in Auckland at the age of 35, a victim of the influenza epidemic of 1918.

His son Scott played as a batsman for Auckland in the 1930s.
