= Sarles (surname) =

Sarles is a surname. Notable people with the surname include:

- Bob Sarles (born 1957), American filmmaker
- Elmore Y. Sarles (1859–1929), American politician
- Nathalie Sarles (born 1962), French politician
- Roscoe Sarles (1892–1922), American racecar driver
- Ruth Sarles Benedict (1906–1996), American journalist
- William Bowen Sarles (1906–1987), American microbiologist
