= Salesman (disambiguation) =

A salesman is a person who engages in the sales of goods or services on behalf of the owner.

Salesman may also refer to:

== Film and television ==
- Salesman (1969 film), an American documentary by the Maysles brothers
- The Salesman (2011 film), a Canadian drama film
- The Salesman (2016 film), an Iranian drama film
- The Salesman (Squid Game), or The Recruiter, a character in the TV series Squid Game

== Music ==
- "Salesman", a song by the Monkees from Pisces, Aquarius, Capricorn & Jones Ltd., 1967
- "Salesman", a song by Stan Ridgway from The Big Heat, 1986
