= Jacques Saly =

French sculptor (1717–1776)

Jacques-François-Joseph Saly
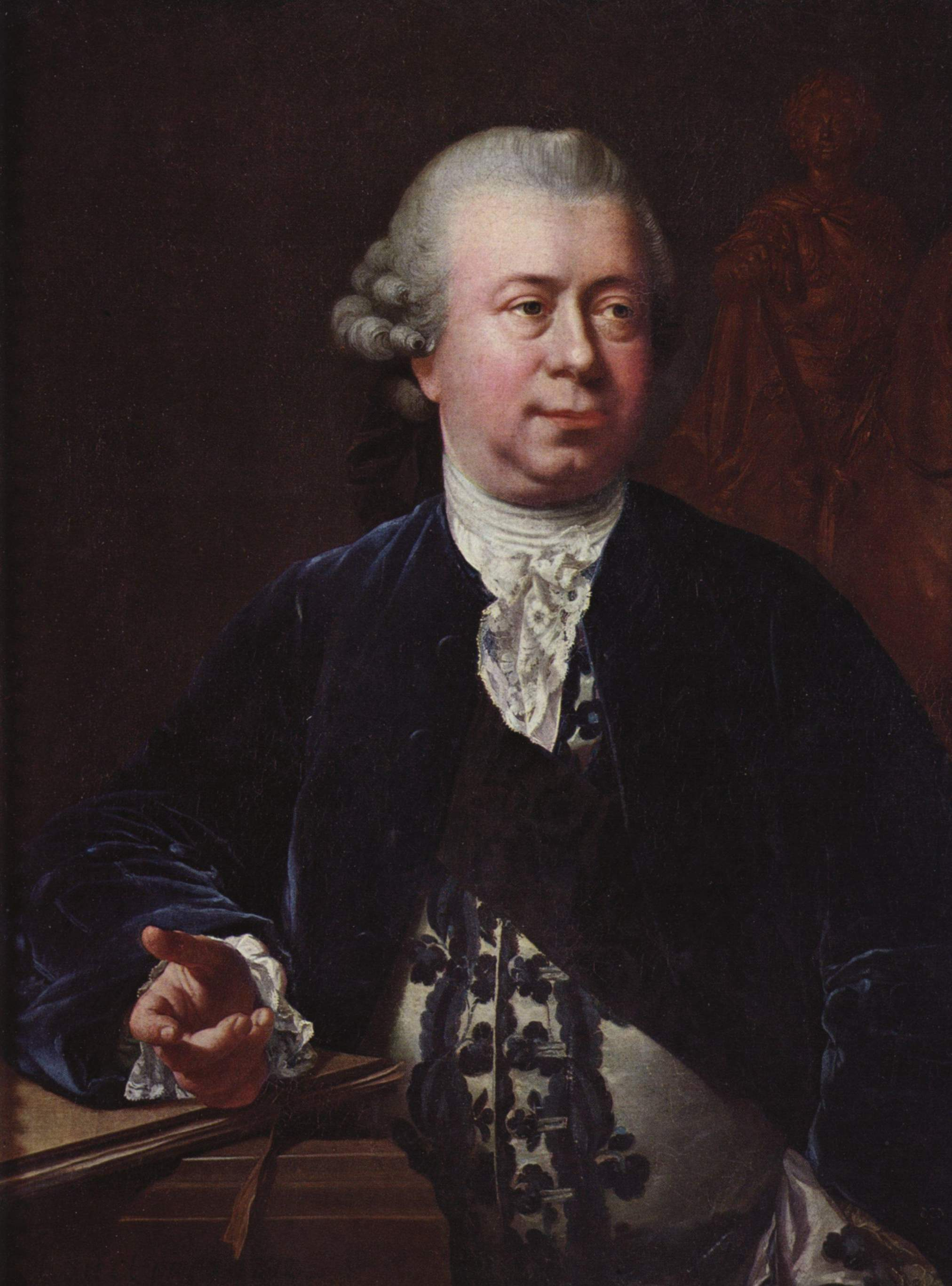
- Jens Juel, Portrait of Jacques Saly, oil on canvas, 1772
- Born: 20 June 1717; Valenciennes, France
- Died: 4 May 1776 (aged 58); Valenciennes, France
- Education: Académie de peinture et de sculpture
- Known for: Sculpture

Jacques François Joseph Saly, also known as Jacques Saly (20 June 1717 – 4 May 1776), French-born sculptor who worked in France, Italy and Malta. He is commonly associated with his time in Denmark he served as Director of the Royal Danish Academy of Art (1754–71). His most noteworthy work is the equestrian statue Frederik V on Horseback at Amalienborg.

== Life ==
=== Training as a sculptor and early career ===
He was born in Valenciennes to François Marie Saly (1684–1776) and his wife Marie-Michelle Jardez (1690–1760). He began his training as a sculptor at nine years of age under local master Antoine Gilles in Valenciennes from 1726-1727. In spite of his parents' meager income, he was sent to Paris in 1732 to train in the studio of the leading sculptor at Paris, Guillaume Coustou. At the same time he attended the school of the Académie royale de peinture et de sculpture, winning medals in 1734, 1737 and 1738.

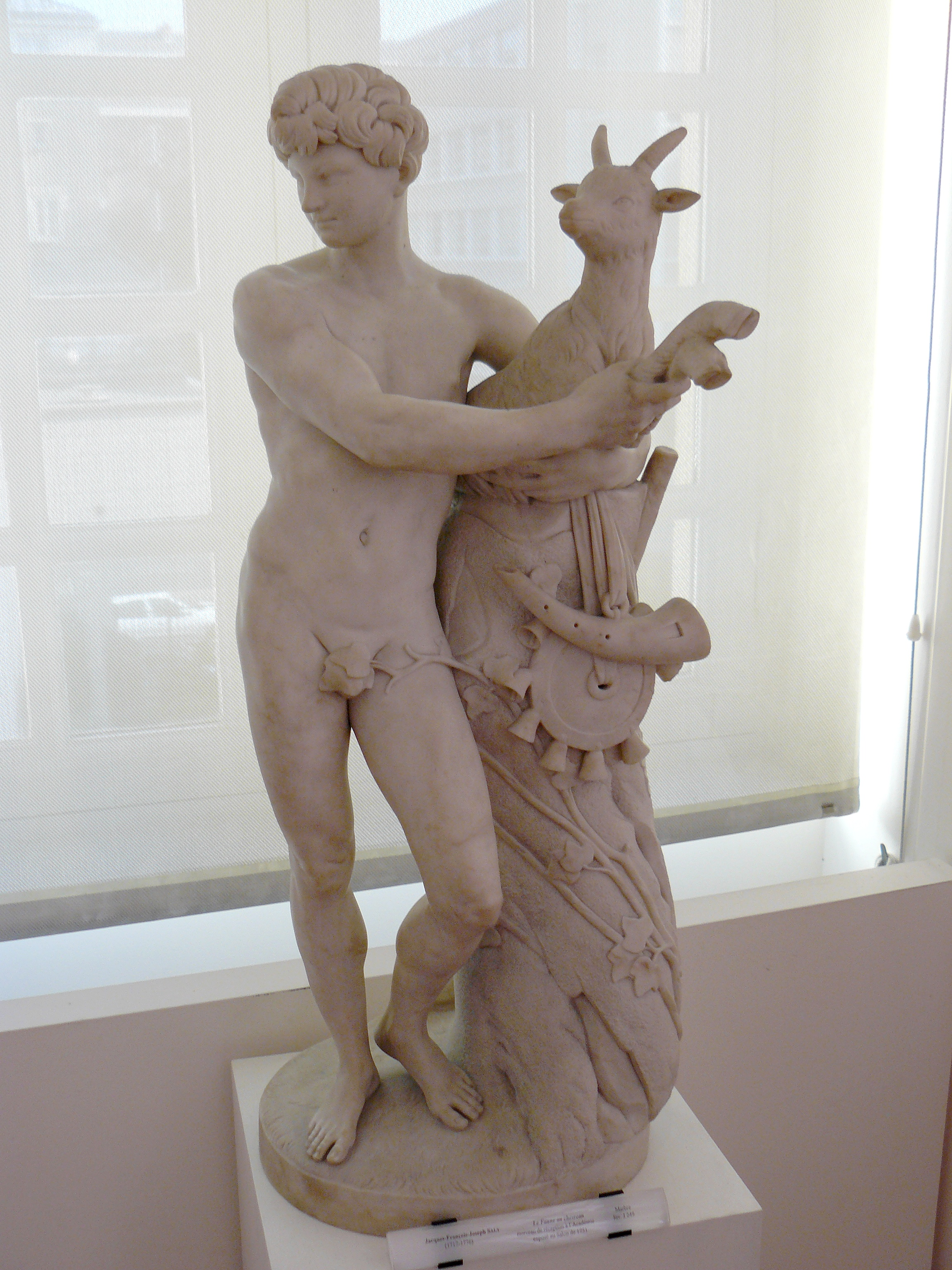
Le Faune au chevreau Musée Cognacq-Jay

Winning that last medal, first place in the Prix de Rome competition, gave him the right to study at the French Academy at Rome, at the time the single mainstream route to a successful official career as a sculptor in Paris. He first received his stipend in 1740, and he arrived in Rome on 13 October 1740. He stayed there for eight years between 1740–1748, and lived at the Academy. The goal here was that through the study of antiquities and the masters of the past, one would develop and refine one's artistic taste. More practically it meant making marble copies of Roman sculpture for the French king.

In 1742 he made a monumental portrait bust of Manuel Pinto de Fonseca, Grand Master of the Order of Malta. In 1744 he made a bust of a little girl which is one of the most reproduced sculptures from the 18th century. He became one of the first French members of the Accademia degli Arcadi in Rome 1744, and of the Academy of Design at Florence, in 1748, and of the accademia di belli arti, Bologna.

=== Return to Paris ===
He traveled back to his home via Naples, Florence and Bologna, and arrived back in Valenciennes in the beginning of March 1749. The works he had sent home had received such positive attention that his hometown commissioned a full standing portrait of King Louis XV from him. The marble statue was erected in 1752, and destroyed in 1792. A plaster bust of Louis XV was also made that same year. He went on to Paris, where he became a member of the Académie royale de peinture et de sculpture in 1751 with his work Le Faune au chevreau. He was assistant professor at the Académie 1751-1753. He exhibited at the Paris Salons, 1750-1751 and 1753.He created a plaster bust of Madame de Pompadour in 1752, and a statue of Amor for her the next year.

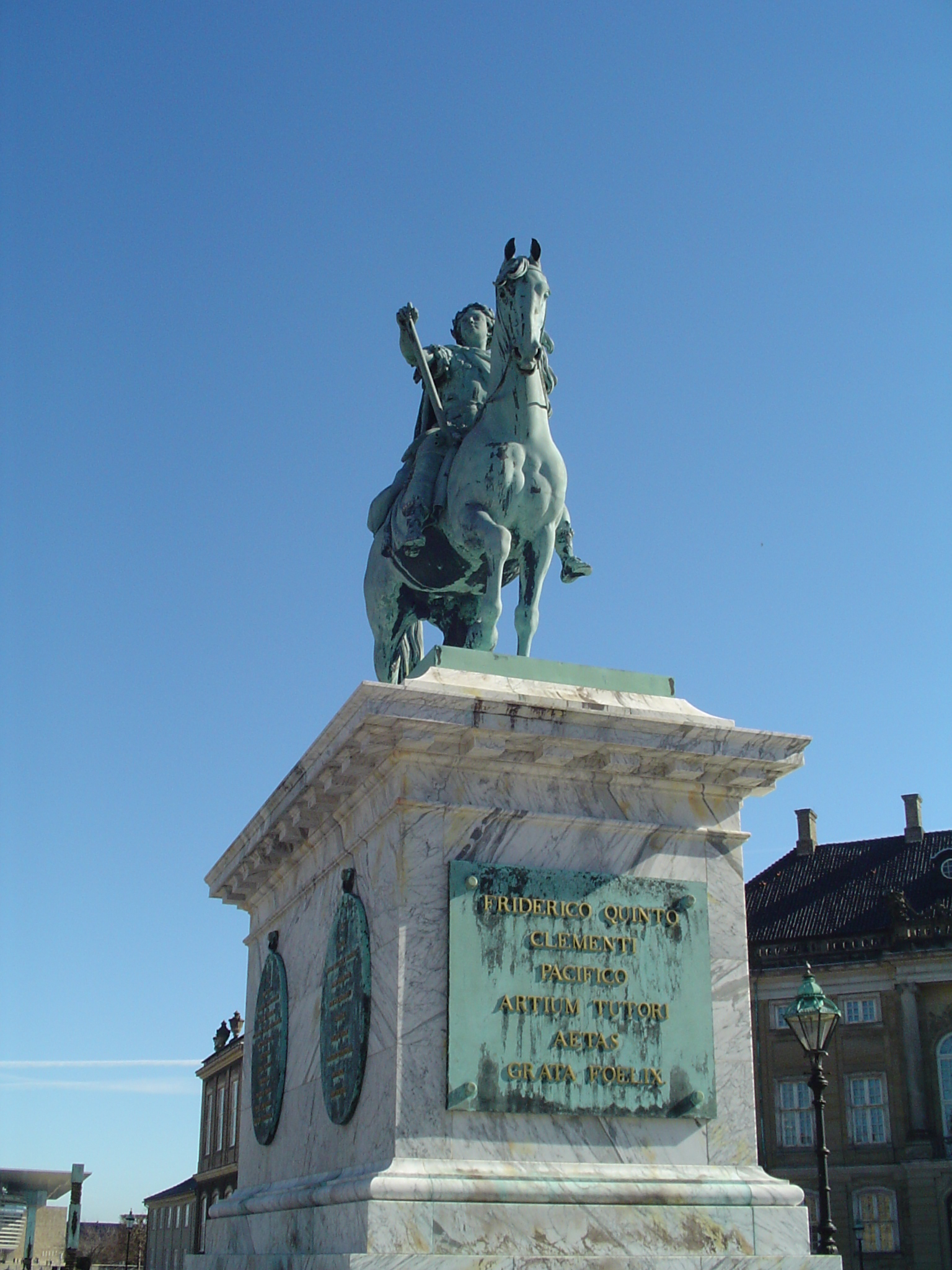
Jacque Saly's monumental sculpture of Frederik V on Horseback at Amalienborg Castle in Copenhagen, Denmark.

=== Summons to Denmark ===
In 1752 Saly was commissioned to create a sculpture of King Frederick V of Denmark on horseback to be placed in the center of the courtyard of Amalienborg Palace. The equestrian statue was commissioned by Adam Gottlob Moltke, head of the Danish Asiatic Company, as a gift to the king. But while Moltke's company offered to finance the statue, it was the government, however, who chose the sculptor. Count Johan Hartvig Ernst Bernstorff wrote to the Danish Legation secretary to the French Court in Paris Justitsråd Joachim Wasserschlebe to find a suitable French sculptor. Sculptor Edmé Bouchardon rejected the offer, but suggested Saly, who wanted a significant sum for the model and free housing in Copenhagen. The government concluded the contract with Saly in Spring 1752, but due to conflict with ongoing projects Saly did not arrive in Denmark until 8 October 1753, bringing with him his parents, his two sisters and at least one assistant, Journée, along with his family. Work began on the monument that same year.

=== In Copenhagen: The Academy ===
During the same period of time the Royal Danish Academy of Art (Det Kongelige Danske Kunstakademi) was officially established with offices at Charlottenborg, on Frederik V's birthday, 31 March 1754. Saly gave the main speech at the event, a snub to the current Academy Director architect Nicolai Eigtved. Saly was made member of the Academy; was named professor, and received a residence at Charlottenborg. Several months later after Eigtved died suddenly on 7 July 1754, Saly was named Eigtved's successor; he served as Director of the Academy from 25 July 1754 to 15 July 1771, and he was given a lifelong yearly pension in 1760. Saly worked hard to improve the Danish Academy after the model of the French Academy. He sought to bring about these changes, all the while working on his model of the equestrian statue for the king, the primary artistic work associated with his many years in Denmark.

Saly was also instrumental in bringing his friend from the French Academy and the years in Italy, fellow-countryman and architect Nicolas-Henri Jardin, to the attention of King Frederik V as the suitable choice to replace Nicolai Eigtved for the design and building of Frederik's Church (Frederikskirke), now known as The Marble Church (Marmorkirken), work on which had begun in 1749. A contract to bring Jardin to Denmark was concluded on 12 October 1754, a few months after Eigtved's death, and Jardin took over Eigtved's professorship at the Academy.

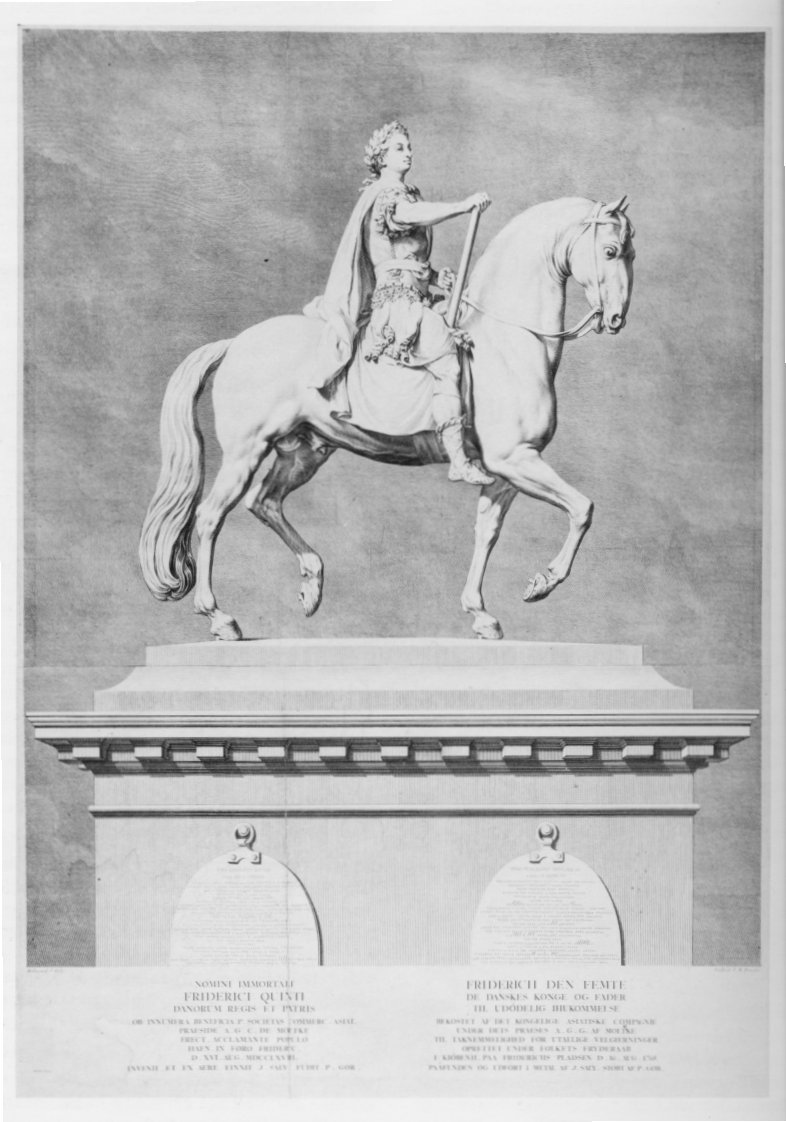
J.M. Preisler's engraving of Saly's equestrian sculpture of Frederik V on horseback. 1768-69.

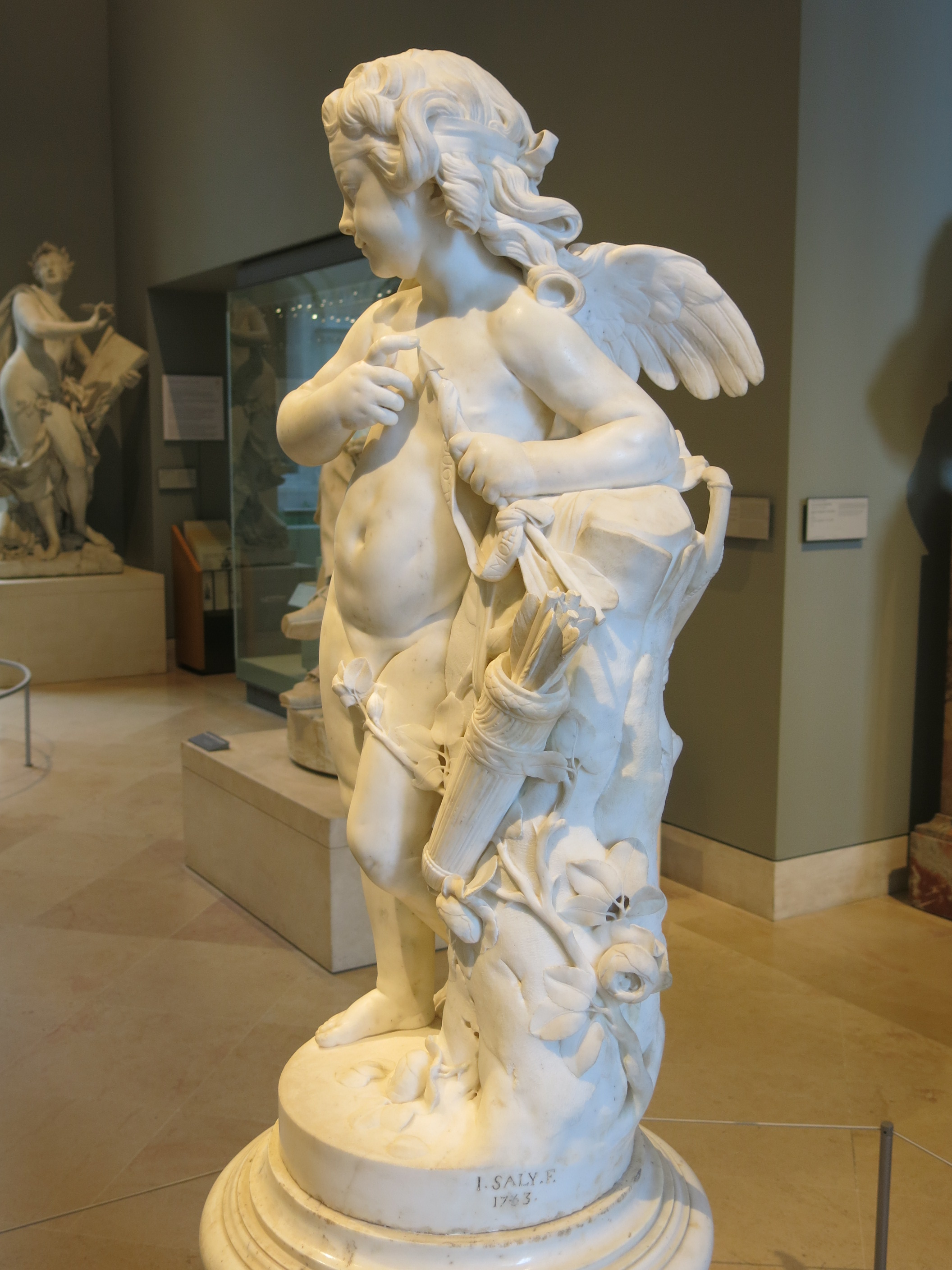
L'Amour de Saly acquired by the Louvre Museum in 2016

=== In Copenhagen: The King and his statue ===
Saly showed the king the first sketch of the equestrian statue on 4 December 1754. The king approved a sketch for the whole monument in August 1755. Then Saly began a thorough study of horses from the king's stalls. This resulted in a little model, which he showed the king in November 1758. Casts of this model are found in both the collection of the Academy and the State Collection, now the Danish National Gallery. Another cast has been exhibited at the Real Academia de Bellas Artes de San Fernando in Madrid, since 1777 when it was donated by Manuel Delitala to whom Saly had gifted it in Copenhagen, according to an inscription on the base. Saly also sculpted around this same time a life-size bust of the king, of which seven bronze casts were created, and a sculpture of Moltke, the head of the Asiatic Company, of which three bronze casts were created.

Saly, after having set up an appropriate studio, carried out the work on the large model of the equestrian statue 1761-1763, and the plaster cast was presented to the Academy members on 3 February 1764. The king also saw this model. Preparations for the bronze casting took four more years, and Frenchman Pierre Gors did the casting on 2 March 1768. 1768 is officially considered the statue's completion date.

Johan Martin Preisler made a large engraving of the equestrian statue 1768-1769 in commemoration of its completion, and The Danish Asiatic Company cast two medallions, one by Wulff and the other by Daniel Jensen Adzer.

The base for the statue, however, was first deliverable in 1770, and the unveiling of the equestrian statue finally took place in the courtyard at Amalienborg Palace on 1 August 1771, five years after the King's death in 1766. It commands the site still to this day, and has been restored 1997-1998.

=== The end of his days in Copenhagen ===
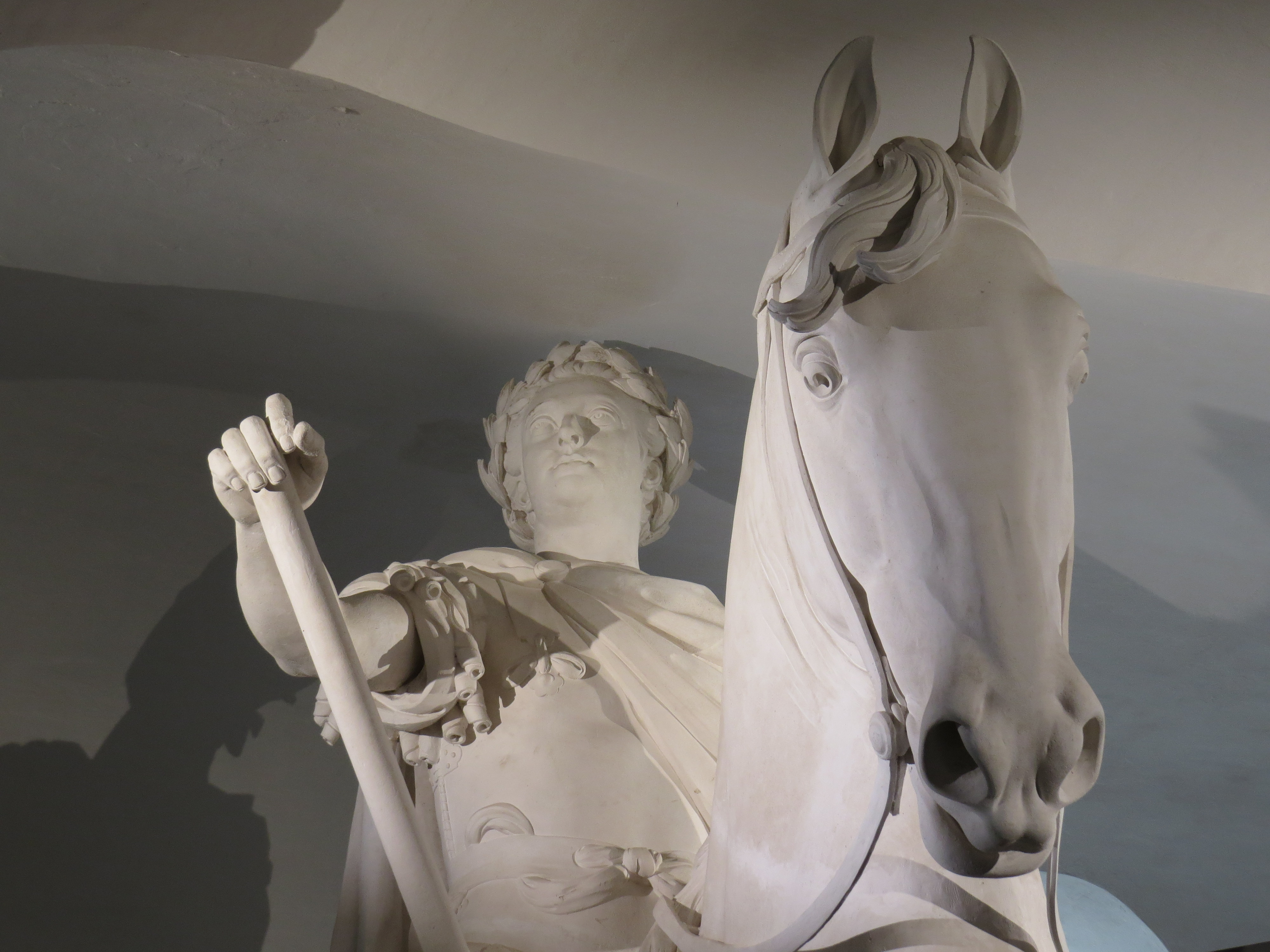
Equestrian monument (detail)

Saly held the post of Academy Director until 15 July 1771, two weeks before the equestrian statue's unveiling. He quit in protest over a new set of rules that gave increased influence to native-born Danes. This all occurred during the reformist reign of Johann Friedrich Struensee,

Saly was named Knight of the Order of St Michel in Paris, but was not allowed to bear the title while living in Denmark.

Saly, although no longer Director of the Academy, kept the apartment at Charlottenborg, from 1771 to at least 1774. During this time he tried to justify an additional sum from the Danish Asiatic Company for his extraordinary services on the monument to Frederik V, considering how much longer the statue took to complete than originally planned. He was not satisfied with the conclusion of his financial negotiations.

=== Return to Paris ===
He left for Paris along with his father on 2 July 1774; most of the other family members had died by this point. One of his two sisters had married a French sea officer in Danish service. Back in Paris in 1775 he could now bear the title of Knight. He was named Senior Professor at the French Academy in Paris 29 July 1775. Already seriously ill when he left Denmark, he died on 4 May 1776. He was buried at Saint-Germain l'Auxerrois.

== Legacy ==
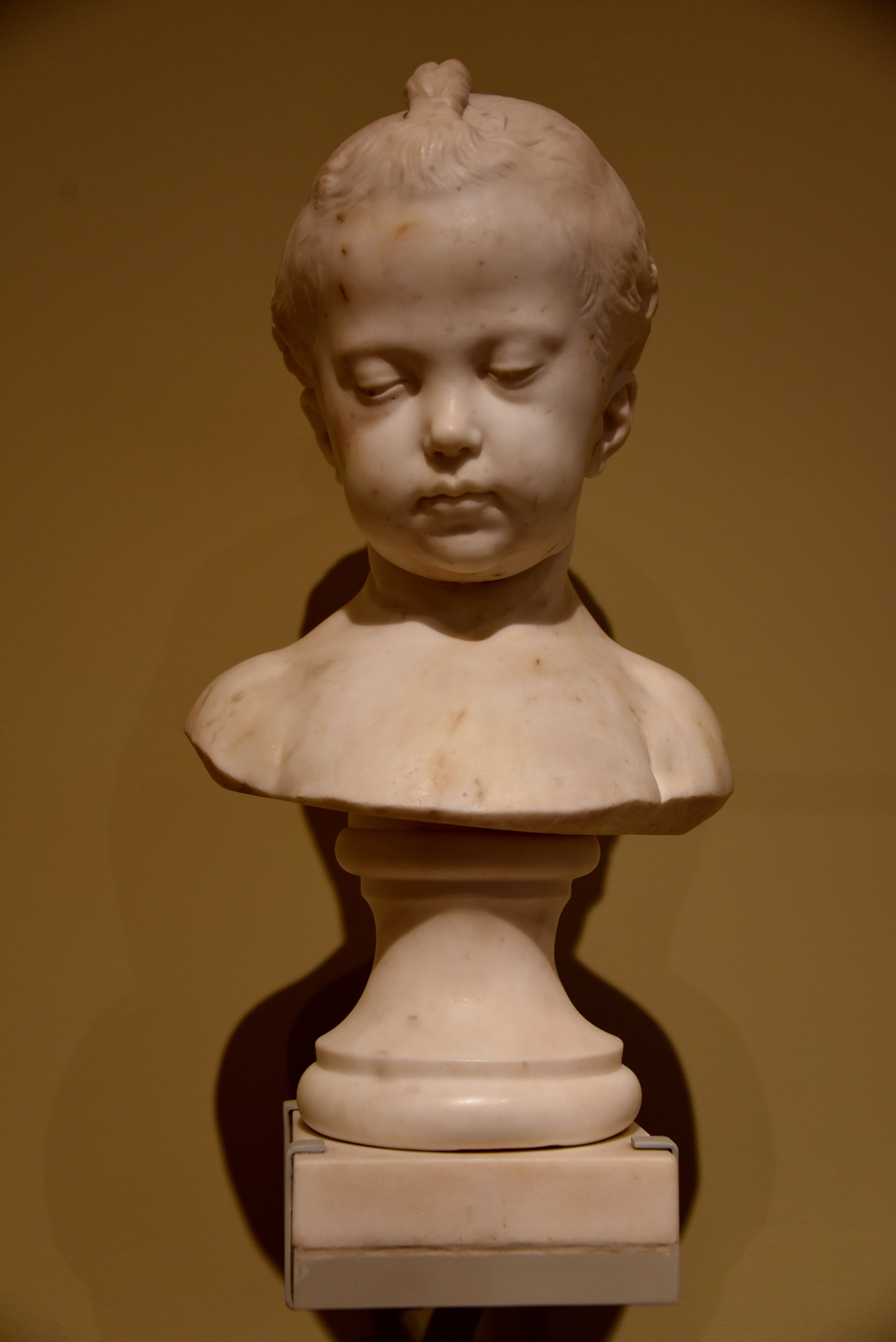
Young Girl. Marble bust, (1770-1790), Victoria and Albert Museum, London

His artistic achievements are overshadowed by the monumental effort to create the equestrian statue of Frederik V of Denmark under the king's absolute rule. Saly's leading role at the Danish Academy of Art, during its early years helped establish the Academy as a force in art training not only in Scandinavia, but in Europe, and led the way to an emerging and strong Danish artist tradition.

In addition to the other Academy memberships already mentioned, Saly was also member of the academies in Marseilles (1762) and St. Petersburg (1768).

His sculptures are in the collections of the National Gallery of Denmark (Copenhagen), National Gallery of Art (Washington D.C.), Musée du Louvre (Paris), Musée des Beaux-Arts (Valenciennes, France) J. Paul Getty Museum (Los Angeles, California), as well as in private collections.

== See also ==
- Art of Denmark
- Danish sculpture

== Other sources ==
- KID Kunst Index Danmark ("Art Index Denmark")
- Danish Biographical Encyclopedia ("Dansk biografisk Leksikion")

== Related reading ==
- Henry Jouin (1896) Jacques Saly, de l'Acad. de peinture de Paris: sculpteur du voi de Danemark (Bureaux de la Gazette des Beaux-Arts)
- Bent Sorensen(1995) L'éléphant de Jacques François Joseph Saly (Gazette des beaux-arts)

Cultural offices
Preceded by Nicolai Eigtved	Director of the Royal Danish Academy of Fine Arts; 1754–1771	Succeeded by Carl Gustaf Pilo
