= Schottmann House =

Historic property in Copenhagen, Denmark

- Schottmanns Gård
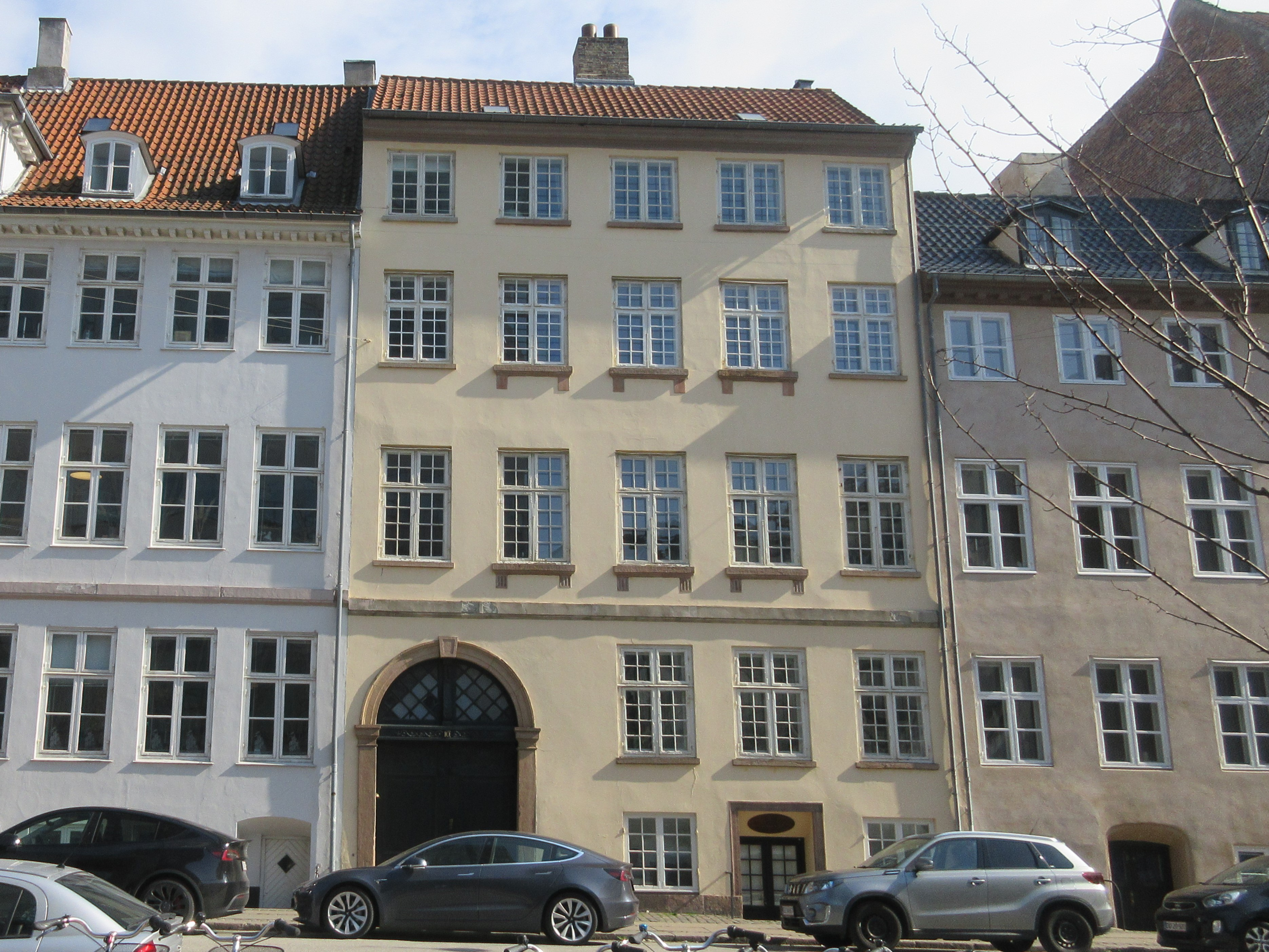
- The facade on Strandgade
- Interactive map of the Schottmann House area

General information
- Location: Copenhagen, Denmark
- Coordinates: 55°40′23.29″N 12°35′19.12″E
- Construction started: 1668
- Completed: 1775

The Schottmann House Danish: (I. B. Schottmannns Gård) is a historic property located at Strandgade 10 in the Christianshavn neighbourhood of Copenhagen, Denmark.

== History ==
=== 17th and 18th century ===
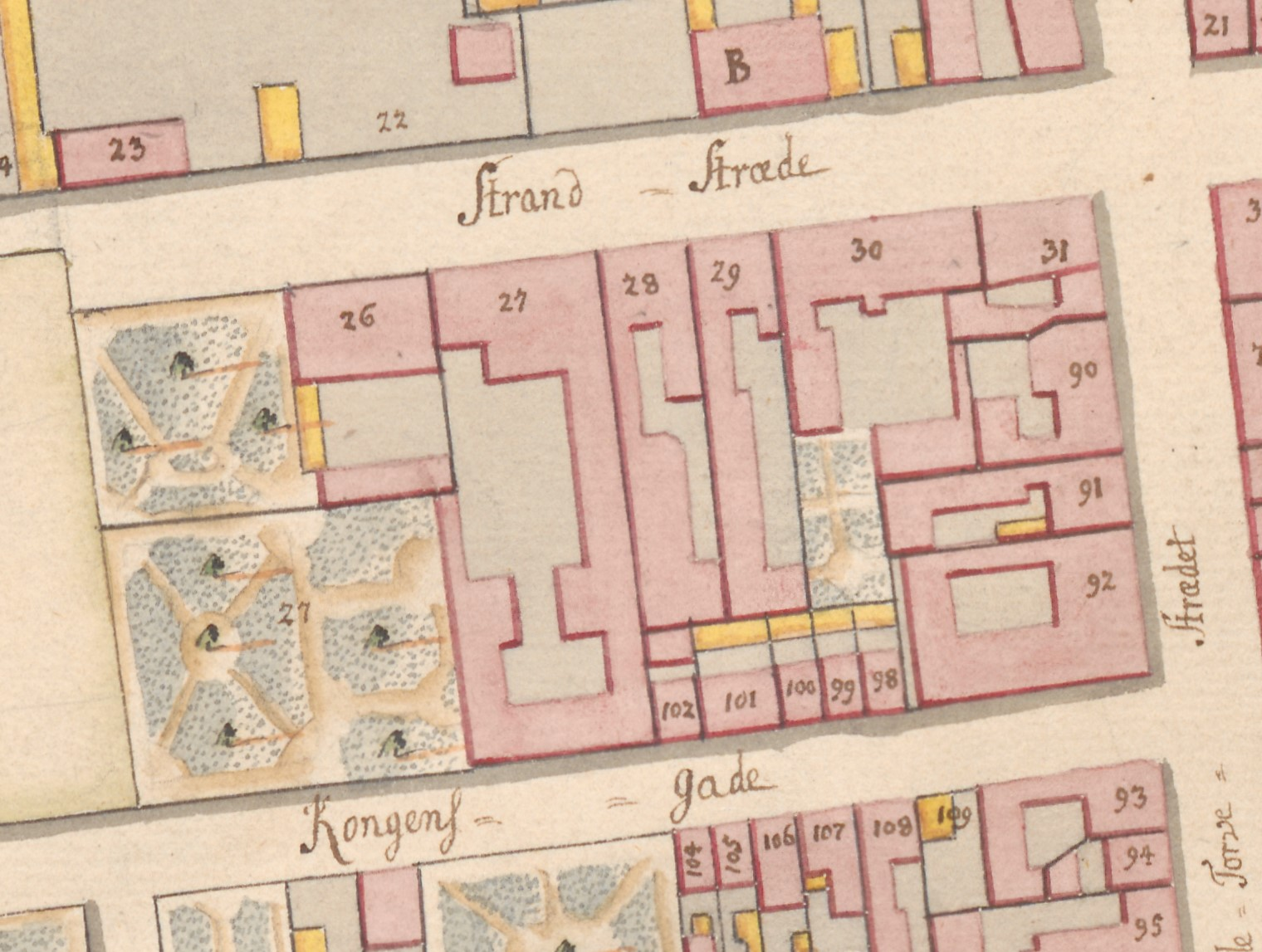
No. 29 seen in a detail from Christian Gedde's map of Christianshavn Quarter, 1757

The site was part of a large property at present-day No. 8–14. Jacob Madsen, Christianshavn's mayor from 1641 to 1653, lived at No. 10. The property was listed as No. 13 in Copenhagen's first cadastre of 1689, and was at that time owned by Frederik Møller. It was later divided into a number of smaller properties. The property now known as Strandgade 10 was listed as No. 29 in the new cadastre of 1756. It was at that time owned by blacksmith Christen Rasmussen.

=== Schottmann family ===
The property was later adapted by master builder Johan Bernhardt Schottmann. Originally from Saxony, he had settled as a mason in Copenhagen in 1763. His later works included a new warehouse for Danish Asiatic Company further down Strandgade (No. 25) and Søkvæsthuset's Bådsmandsgade Wing.

The property was home to 33 residents in five households at the time of the 1787 census. Anna Chathrine Schottmann resided in the building with her five children (aged four to 19), her sister Sophie Amalia Arenkilde, a clerk, a coachman and a maid. Johan Friedrich Høske, a merchant (grosserer), resided in the building with his wife Cathrine, an apprentice and a maid. Sidselle Margrethe Dahl, a widow with a pension, resided in the building with her 21-year-old son Rasmus Dahl (helmsman) and the 20-year-old lodger William Sperice (clerk). Peter Hansteen, a senior clerk (fuldmægtig), resided in the building with his wife Marie Elisabeth, their nine-year-old daughter, a 21-year-old daughter from the wife's first marriage, a 52-year-old widow lodger and a maid. Ole Bensen, a workman, resided in the building with his wife Ellen, their one-year-old son and seven lodgers (two masons, two musqueteers, one sailor and two surgery students).

The property was home to 29 residents in six households at the 1801 census. Ane Cathrine Schottmann resided in the building with three of her children (aged 17 to 23), one male servant and one maid. Johan Christopher Schottmann, her son and now himself a master mason, resided in another apartment with his wife Sophie Amalie Schottmann, their three children (aged four to eight) and one maid. Peter Friderich Becker, a merchant (grosserer), resided in the building with his wife Cathrine Becker, a governess and two maids. Hans Peter Svensen, a skipper, resided in the building with his wife Cathrine Nicoline Svensen, their two sons (aged three and seven) and one maid. Johan Bernhart Ravn, a cooper, resided in the building with his wife Ane Sophie Ravn, their two-year-old daughter, a maid, a cooper and a ship carpenter. Hans Jørgen Brosgaard (c. 1755–1812), a 45-year-old helmsman, was the last tenant in the building. In 1807, he served as first helmsman on onboard Hans Peter Jofoed's slave ship General Muhlenfels on a voyage to the Danish West Indies.

The property was listed as No. 53 in the new cadastre of 1806. It was at that time owned by Anne Cathrine Schottmann.

=== 19th century ===
The writer Johan Jørgensen Jomtou (1681–1866) was a resident of the building in 1838–39.

At the time of the 1840 census, No. 53 was home to 65 residents in 11 households. Charel Andersen, a wall polisher, resided on the ground floor with his wife Metea Marie Andersen, their two sons (aged five and nine), a maid and lodger Nicolai Erik Stabel. Jens Brus, a master painter, resided on the first floor with his wife Elise Marie Brus, their two children (aged seven and eight), two apprentices and a maid. Johan Christian Gerhardt, a grocer (urtekræmmer), resided on the first floor with his wife Marie Gerhardt, their four children (aged four to seven), a grocer (employee), a caretaker and a maid. Anton Charel Luplau, a cantor and bell-ringer at Grederich's Church, resided on the third floor with his wife Claudine Luplau and their five children (aged 17 to 25). Anne Kirstine Møller, a widow barkeeper, resided in the basement with her two children (aged nine and 11). Anne Seselie Sonberg, another widow, employed with cleaning and laundry, resided on the first floor of the side wing with her 26-year-old daughter. Anton Alixsander Kolding, a ship carpenter, resided on the second floor of the side wing with his wife Ellen Olsen Kolding and their two children (aged one and three). Chatrine Johansen, a widow seemstress, resided on the third floor of the side wing. Johan Frederich Abel, a master nail smith, resided on the first floor of the rear wing with his wife Anne Marie Werner, their six children (aged two to 17), his mother-in-law Anne Marie Werner, two smiths (employees) and three apprentices. Hans Jørgensen, a coachman, resided on the second floor of the rear wing with his wife Johanne Marie Jørgensen and his six children (aged one to 12). Johan Ludvig Liehtenstein, a watchman (and recipient of Dannebrogsordenens Hæderstegn), resided on the second floor of the rear wing.

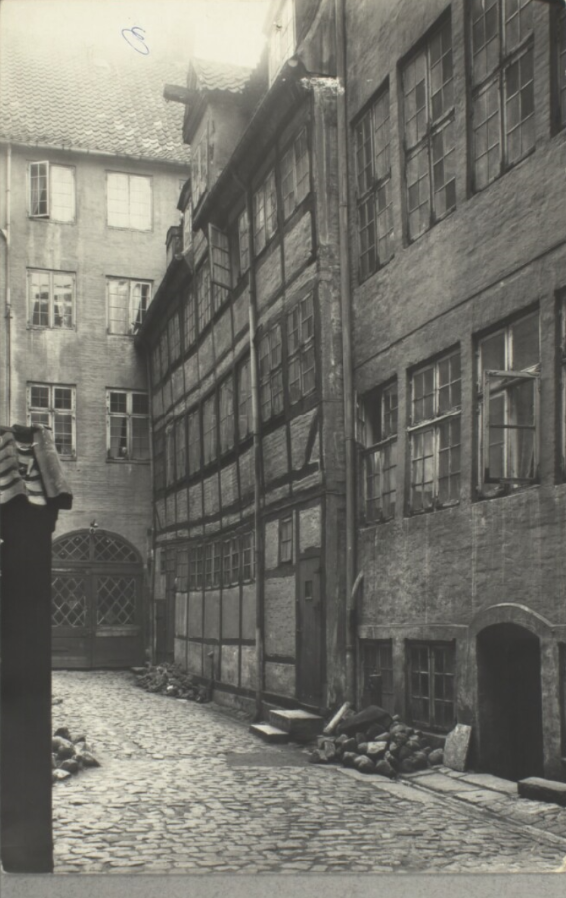
The courtyard

The property was home to a total of 51 residents at the 1860 census. Carl Adolph Lybecker (1817–1880), a bookkeeper, resided on the ground floor with his wife Kirstine Marie Lybecker (née Jessen), their five children (aged four to 12), his mother Cathirine Marie Lybecker (née Bugge) and one maid. Jens Bruis, a master painter, resided on the first floor with his wife Sophie Bruis (née Risch) and one maid. Carl Ludvig Richter (1807–1881), a merchant (grosserer), resided on the second floor with his wife Henriette Louise Nathalie (née Meldahl, 1818–1900), their two children (aged 17 and 18) and one maid. Johan Hvam, a former teacher at the Royal Danish Theatre, resided on the third floor with his wife Anna Hvam and their four children (aged 10 to 24). Severin Møller, a turner, resided on the ground floor of the rear wing with his wife Ottomine Møller and their four children (aged two to 12). Richard Bosen, a blacksmith, resided on the first floor of the rear wing with his wife Louise Nicoline Jensine Bosen (née Amonsen), a maid and two apprentices. Niels Gothardt, a former painter, resided on the second floor of the rear wing with his wife Karen Gothardt and their 33-year-old son (joiner). Anna Krogh (née Thorsen), a widow, resided on the third floor of the rear wing with her 24-year-old daughter Laura Alvilda Krogh and three lodgers. Jens Riis, a ship's cook, resided in the basement with his wife Engeborg Riis, their two children (aged three and 13) and one maid.

=== 20th century ===
Hans Brenaa operated a ballet school in the side wing in the 1950s. Knudsen og Homaas Maskinværksted, a machine workshop, was also located in the side wing around that time.

== Architecture ==
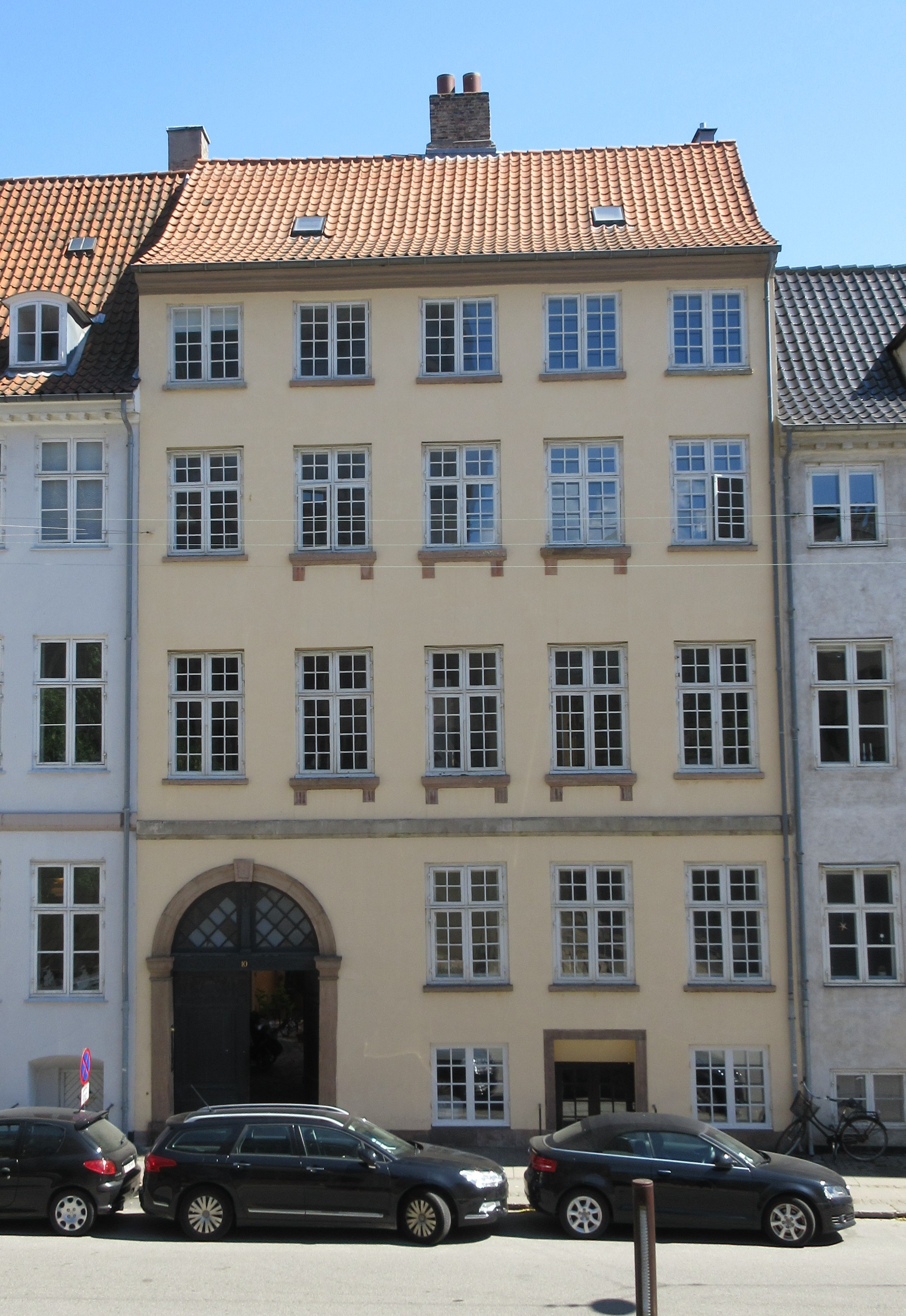
The facade viewed from Strandgade

The building is four storeys tall and five bays wide. The gate opens to a narrow, cobbled courtyard. It is to the southwest defined by two consecutive side wings, one in brick and one with timber framing, and to the southeast by a rear wing. The last side of the courtyard is defined by the side wing and rear wing of the Jennow House at No. 12.
