= Kompagnistræde 8 =

Building in Copenhagen

- Kompagnistræde 8
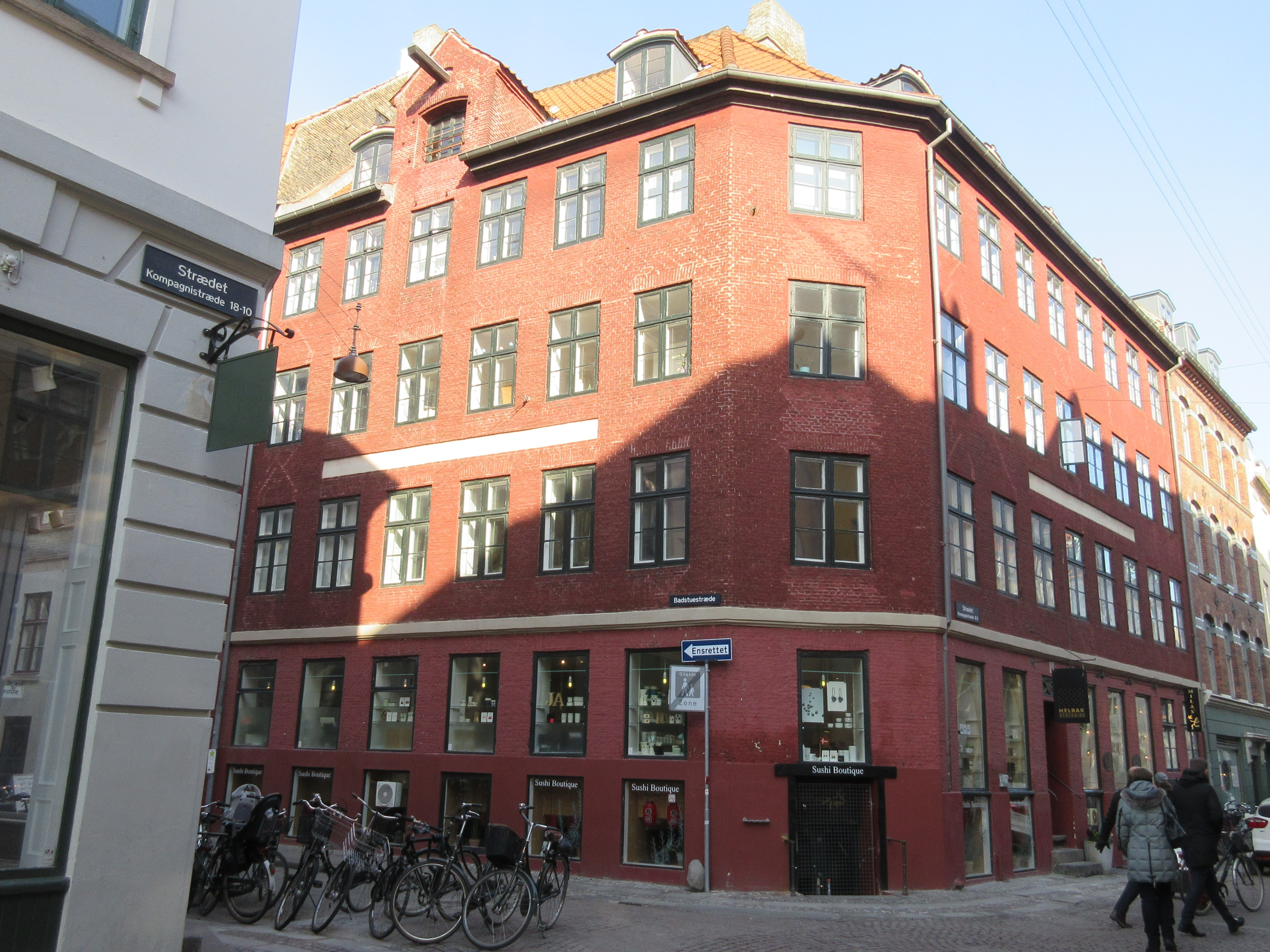
- Interactive map of the Kompagnistræde 8 area

General information
- Location: Copenhagen, Denmark
- Coordinates: 55°40′39.47″N 12°34′34.82″E
- Completed: 1800

Kompagnistræde 8 is a Neoclassical building situated at the corner of Kompagnistræde and Badstuestræde in the Old Town of Copenhagen, Denmark. It was constructed in 1799-1800 as part of the rebuilding of the city following the Copenhagen Fire of 1795. It was listed in the Danish registry of protected buildings and places in 1950.

== History ==
=== 18th century ===
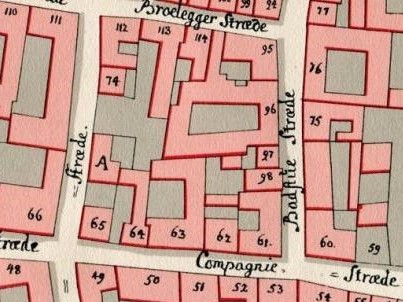
No. 60 seen in a detail from Christian Gedde's map of Snaren's Quarter, 1757

The site was in the end of the 17th century part of two different properties. One of them was listed in Copenhagen's first cadastre of 1689 as No. 61 in Snaren's Quarter and was at that time owned by a secretary named Seckmann. The other one was listed as No. 62 and belonged to beer seller (øltapper) Jacob Baldtersen. The two properties were later merged into a single property. This property was listed in the new cadastre of 1756 as No, 60 (but later referred to as No. 60A) and was at that time owned by Jacob Meyer.

=== H. Weile ===
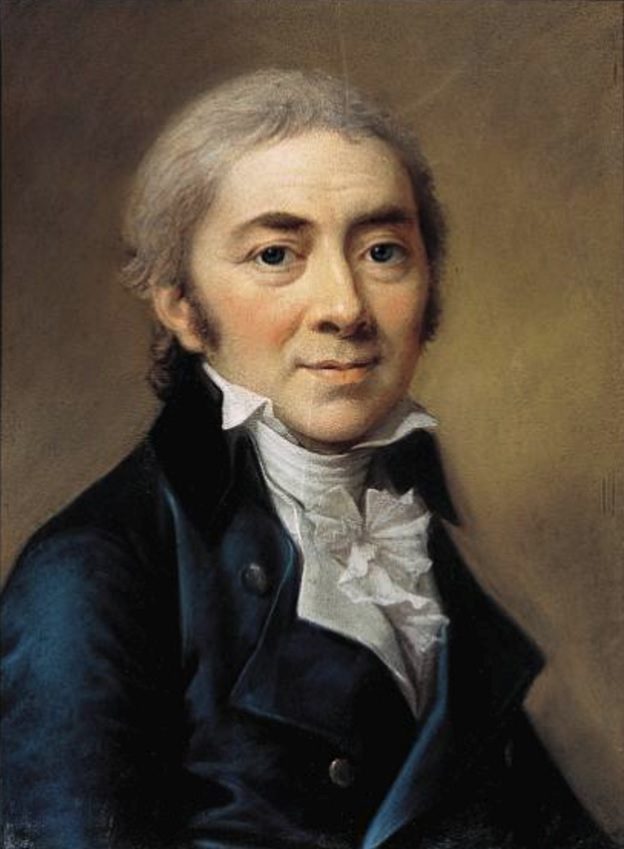
Rasmus Lange

The building was completely destroyed in the Copenhagen Fire of 1795, together with most of the other buildings in the area. The current building on the site was constructed in 1799-1800 by master carpenter Hand Weile in partnership with lawyer Rasmus Hansen Lange. Weile had recently completed the construction of the building at Kompagnistræde 12 (then No. 72). He was around the same time also working on the construction of Bafstuestræde 15 in partnership with Johan Bernhardt Schottmann.

The property is for some reason not mentioned in the census records from 1801, either because the building had not yet been completed by 1 February of that year or because the census records are simply missing. Hans Weile resided in his other building (No. 62, now Kompagnistræde 12) with his wife Inger Casse, their four children (aged two to 11), two maids and two lodgers (carpenters) at the 1801 census.

The old No. 60 was listed as No. 64 in the new cadastre of 1806, now with H. Weile as its sole owner. The old No. 62 was now listed as No. 66 and was also still owned by him at that time.

=== 1840 census ===
The property was later acquired by one M. Leby. In 1832, he expanded the building with a new three-bay side wing. The property was home to 43 residents in seven households at the time of the 1840 census. Simon Levin, a master goldsmith and Civilian Infantry captain, resided on the ground floor to the left with his wife Dorothea Hansen, their four children (aged 12 to 23) and one maid. One of the daughters, Emilie Levin, studied acting at the Royal Danish Theatre. Eduarad Schoewel, a master basketmaker, resided on the ground floor to the right with his wife Anna Späthmann, their three children (aged one to three), two apprentices and one maid. Franz Just, a first lieutenant in the Royal Artillery Corps, resided on the first floor with his wife Anna (née Papp), their two sons (aged two and three), his mother-in-law Helene Kjølner and two maids. Louis Klein, a typographer, resided on the second floor with his wife Emilie Køhler, their infant daughter and one maid. Johann Jürs (1808-1857), a German teacher at the Royal Army Cadet Academy, resided on the third floor to the right with his wife Anna Olson, their four children (aged one to nine) and a governess. Abraham de Fonseca, a financier (Vexelmægler), resided on the third floor to the left with his wife Maria Kjærskov, three of their children (aged 17 to 28) and one lodger (a 17-year-old boy from Saint Croix). The daughter Julie was an actress and singer at the Royal Danish Theatre. She had studied singing under Giuseppe Siboni but did not achieve the same level of success as her elder sister, Ida Henriette da Fonseca (who did not live with her parents at the time of the 1840 census). Their brother Theodor (one of the residents at the 1840 census) is in the 1840 census records registered as a student at the Royal Danish Academy of Fine Arts but is not remembered as an artist in posterity. Cathrine Klitscher, a restaurateur, resided in the basement with one lodger and one maid.

Emile Klein (née Køhlert) had from her uncle, Christian Gottfried Voelker, manager of Køng Textile Factory, inherited the right to produce the so-called Køng Plaster, a very popular remedy for treating wounds (prepared from red lead, olive oil and camphor). She prepared it in some rooms in the rear wing of the property in Kompagnistræde. Sales went so well that after just a few years it enabled them to buy Andreas Seidelin's printing business. They resided at Købmagergade (then No. 65 in Frimand's Quarter) at the time of the 1945 census.

=== 1850 census ===
The property was home to 47 residents in 10 households at the 1850 census. The master goldsmith Simon Levin was still residing on the ground floor to the left with his son and follow goldsmith Carl Theodor Levin and one maid. Moritz Heilbuth, a silk and textile merchant, resided on the ground floor to the right with his brother David Jacob Heilbuth, the brother's wife Henriette Caroline Heilbuth (née Heilberg), their two children (aged five and 16) and one maid. Christian Frederik Emil Bache, a customs official, resided in another apartment with his 26-year-old son Rudolf August Bache and one maid. Caroline Liebert, one of the residents from the 1840 census. was still residing in the building with her youngest daughter Thora Schyth and one maid. Israel Heilbuth, another silk and textile merchant, resided in the building with four other members of the Heilbuth family (aged 38 to 42). Rosa Salomon (née Fridericia, 1684-1864), widow of hosier (hosekræmmer) Joel Salomon, resided in the building with five of her children (aged 19 to 31) and one maid. Peter Wilhelm Andersen, one of dowager Queen Marie's lackeys, resided on the third floor to the right with his wife Jacobine Andersen (née Jacobsen), one lodger and one maid. Frederik Eduard Emil Gylche, a copyist in the Ministry of Financial Affairs, resided on the third floor to the left with his wife Hedevig Rasmine Cathrine Gylche. Ann C. Sørensen født Berg, a widow preparing smoked food, resided in the basement with two of her children (aged 19 and 22) and one maid. Svend Knudsen, a wheelwright, resided in the basement to the left with his wife Sophie, their five children (aged three to 14) and one maid.

=== 1860 census ===
The property was home to 21 residents at the 1860 census. Israel Heilbutte was still residing on the second floor with four sisters (aged 41 to 51), a maid and a lodger. Rosa Salomon and her daughter Pauline Salomon were also resident on the second floor. Christiane Birgitte Bang, a 68-year-old widow, resided in the other second floor apartment with her 36-year-old son Jørgen Carl Peter Bang (merchant, urtelræmmer) and 31-year-old daughter Laura Catherine Bang. Caroline Liebert was still residing on the first floor to the left with her niece Thora Carola Schyth and one maid. Carl Frieder. Wilhelm Starck and Fritz Marius Tofte, a floor clerk and an assistant in the Ministry of Financial Affairs, respectively, resided alone in the first floor apartment to the right. Caroline Petersen, a 65-year-old widow, resided on the third floor to the left towards the yard with her 21-year-old daughter and the lodger Carl Ulrik Lang (civil servant in the Ministry of Naval Affairs). Inger Petersen, a former innkeeper, resided on the ground floor with her three sons (aged 11 to 20). The eldest son was a saddler. Caroline Petersen, a 53-year-old widow, resided on the third floor towards the yard with her 21-year-old daughter and a lodger. Hans Christian Truelsen, a Collaborateur resided in another apartment with a niece (housekeeper) and a maid.

=== 1880 census ===
The property was home to 44 residents at the 1880 census. The residents included a master tailor, a retired customs officer, a book binder and a number of women occupied with needlework.

== Architecture ==
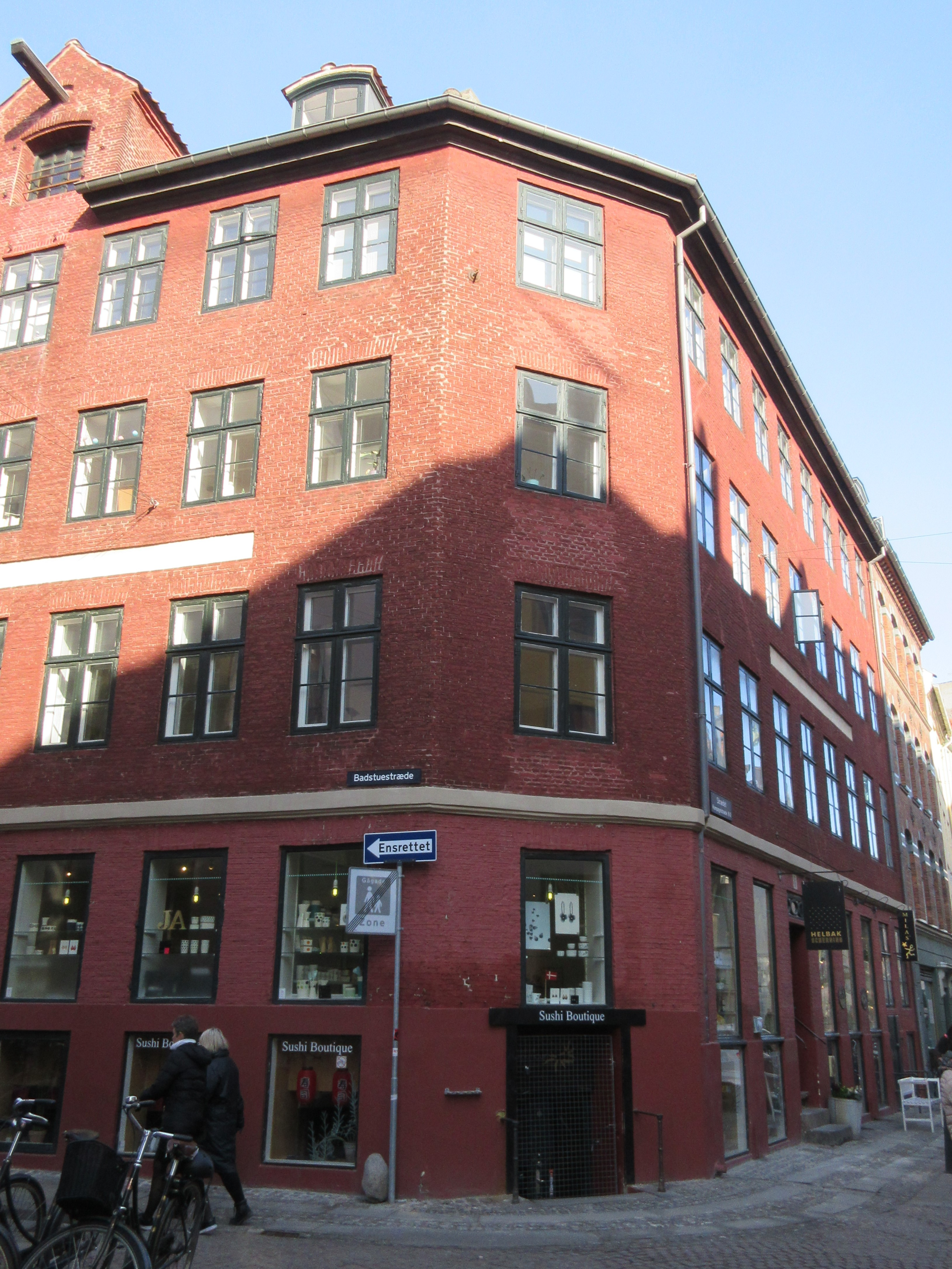
The building in 2018

The property is constructed in brick with four storeys over a walk-out basement. It has an eight-bays-long facade on Kompagnistræde, a six-bays long facade on Badstuestræde and a chamfered corner. The latter was dictated for all corner buildings by Jørgen Henrich Rawert's and Peter Meyn's guidelines for the rebuilding of the city after the fire so that the fire department's long ladder companies could navigate the streets more easily. The masonry is rendered with a thin layer of red lime mortar. The façade is finished with a grey belt course above the ground floor, recessed bands between the four central windows of the first and second floor towards both streets and a grey-painted cornice. The main entrance is situated in the third bay from the left in Kompagnistræde underneath an ornamental transom window and a stone tablet with the house number. The two basement entrances are located in the corner bay and in the second bay from the right Kompagnistræde. The pitched red tile roof features a series of dormer windows towards the both streets whose rhythm is interrupted by a wall dormer with a pulley beam towards Badstuestræde. A three-bay from 1832 extends from the rear side of the furthest to the east in Kompagnistræde. The building is on the yard side rendered with iron vitriol yellow lime plastering.

== Today ==
The property is owned by E/F Kompagnistræde 8. It contains a restaurant and a shop in the basement and condominiums on the upper floors.
