= Kompagnistræde 12 =

Neoclassical property in Copenhagen, Denmark

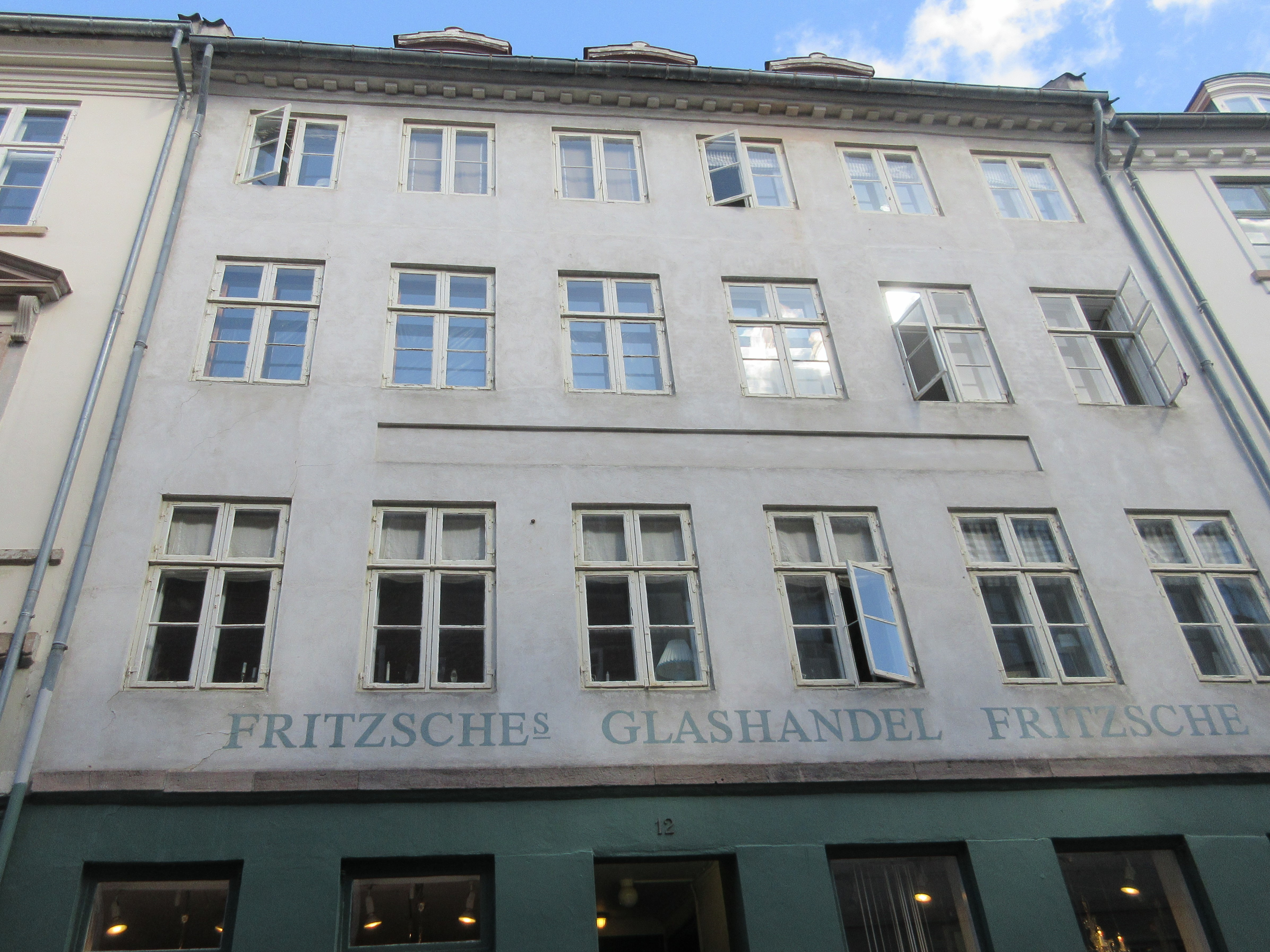
- Interactive map of the Kompagnistræde 12 area

General information
- Location: Copenhagen, Denmark
- Coordinates: 55°40′38.75″N 12°34′33.28″E
- Completed: 1709

Kompagnistræde 12 is a Neoclassical property situated on the shopping street Strædet, between Badstuestræde and Knabrostræde, in the Old Town of Copenhagen, Denmark. Like most of the other buildings in the area, it was constructed as part of the rebuilding of the city following the Copenhagen Fire of 1795. The building was listed in the Danish registry of protected buildings and places in 1964. C. E. Fritzsche, a glass shop with roots dating back to 1788, is now based in the building.

== History ==
=== 18th century ===
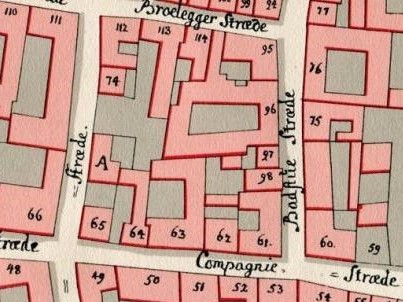
No. 62 seen on a detail from Christian Gedde's map of Snaren's Quarter, 1757

The site was part of a larger property in the 17th century. In 1689, it was listed as No. 64 in Snaren's Quarter, owned by the Royal Copenhagen Shooting Society. This property was later divided into a number of smaller properties. The property now known as No. 12 was listed as No. 62 in 1756, owned by language tutor (sprogmester) Henrik Gabriel Lagoo.

At the time of the 1787 census, No. 72 was home to a total of 50 people distributed among nine households. The property was owned at that time by Anna Cathrina Cramer, the 39-year-old widow of a caretaker at Christiansborg Palace, who lived there with her two children (aged two and five), two lodgers and one maid. Salomon Lazarcs, a merchant, resided in the building with his wife Hendel Philip, their five children (aged two to seven) and two maids. Peter Friderich Lepper, an unmarried master building painter, resided in the building with his brother and fellow building painter Carel Wilhelm Lepper, their sister Birgitte Susanne Lepper, three more painters and two painter's apprentices. John Olsen Sandberg, a salt toller (saltmåler) at Bejerboden, resided in the building with his wife Karen Ols Datter, their two children (aged nine and 12), a maid and two lodgers (a master tailor and a book printer). Christiane Ingvarsen, the 58-year-old widow of a brewer, resided in the building with her three children (aged 21 and 31). Johan Gotlieb Bumgarten, a carpenter, resided in the building with his wife Mette Kirstine Caspars Datter and their one-year-old daughter Charlotte. Johan Helfred, a master hatter, resided in the building with fellow hatters Anthon Nicolai Wiinberg and Johan Wilhelm. Birgitte Israel, a 51-year-old widow merchant, resided in the building with her son David Moses, their relative Samsom Helsom and the latter's mother Ellen Moses Datter. Ole Joseph, a smith working for Orlogsværftet on Golmen, resided in the basement with his wife Ann Magrethe Bruun, a maid and two lodgers.

=== Hans Weile and the new building ===
The property, together with most of the other buildings in the area, was destroyed in the Copenhagen Fire of 1728. The current building on the site was constructed in 1797–1798 by Hans Weile. Weile was later involved in the construction of Kompagnistræde 8 in 1799–1800 (in partnership with the attorney Rasmus Hansen Lange) and Badstuestræde 15 in 1798–1802 (in collaboration with Johan Bernhardt Schottmann).

At the time of the 1801 census, No. 52 was home to a total of 52 people distributed among nine households. Hans Weyle resided in the building with his wife Inger Casse, their four children (aged two to 11), two maids and two lodgers (carpenters). Cornelius Fack, a master goldsmith, resided in the building with his wife Ingeborg Roland, their five-year—old son Jens Fack, the 34-year-old lodger Birgitte Abelone Fack, two goldsmiths, a goldsmith's apprentice and a maid. Peter Hansen Holm, a master carpenter, resided in the building with his wife Cecilie Marie Didrichsen, their two children (aged four and 15), a maid, a lodger (a Swedish lieutenant named Bøkman) and the lodger's servant. Hendrik Friedrich Peissel, a medical doctor, resided in the building with his wife Sophia Elisabeth Lund, their four-year-old foster daughter Martha Andersdatter, a lodger and a maid. Johan Jacob Meer, a master trimmings-maker, resided in the building with their two children (aged two and five), two apprentices and a maid. Isac Bernt Cohen, a lead singer, resided in the building with his wife Sophie Wulf and their seven-year-old son Wulf Cohen. Erechos Ludvig Mange, a master tailor, resided in the building with his wife Pauline Brok, the 66-year-old widow Rachel Levis and the latter's four-year-old grandson Levi Wulff. Johan Adam Greim, a candlemaker, resided in the building with his wife Birthe Ernst, their five-year-old daughter Lisbeth Greim and four lodgers. Michael Bølckov, a master mason, resided in the building with his wife Marie Margrethe Møller, their four-year-old daughter Anne Magdalene Bølckov, a coachman and a maid.

The property was listed as No. 66 in the new cadastre of 1806. It was still owned at that time by Hans Weile.

=== Simon Aron Eibeschütz ===
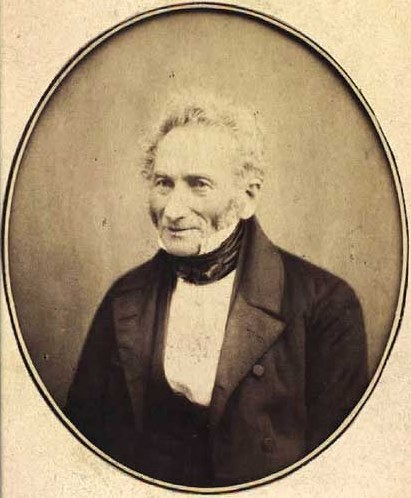
Simon Aron Eibeschütz

The property was later acquired by the Jewish merchant Simon Aron Eibeschütz. On 28 January 1834 (Frederick VI's birthday), it was listed as Simon Aron Eibeschütz Fribolig, turned into a charity with accommodation for 14 indigent Jewish families. Four of the dwellings were reserved for members of his and his wife's own families. In the first half of the 19th century, Kompagnistræde and Læderstræde were the streets with the highest concentration of Jewish residents. The charity was by 1840 referred to as Trøstens Bolig, not to be confused with several other charities by the same name. At the time of the 1840 census, No. 66 was home to a total of 48 people. At the time of the 1860 census, No. 66 was home to 41 people.

=== 20th century ===
In 1902, Eibeschütz Stiftelse (Simon Aron Eibeschütz Fribolig) relocated to a new building at Ny Kongensgade 10–12.

In 1946, C. E. Fritzsche opened a shop in the building. The shop was taken over by Carl Edward Fritzsche in 1976. In 1981, he and his wife Ingrid Fritzsche were able to buy the whole property of Kompagnistræde 12. The firm traces its roots back to 1788. Carl Edward Fritzsche (1809–1873) was appointed by Christian VIII as Court Glass Merchant in 1840. In 1976, Court Glass Merchant was changed to Purveyors to H. M. the Queen of Denmark.

== Architecture ==
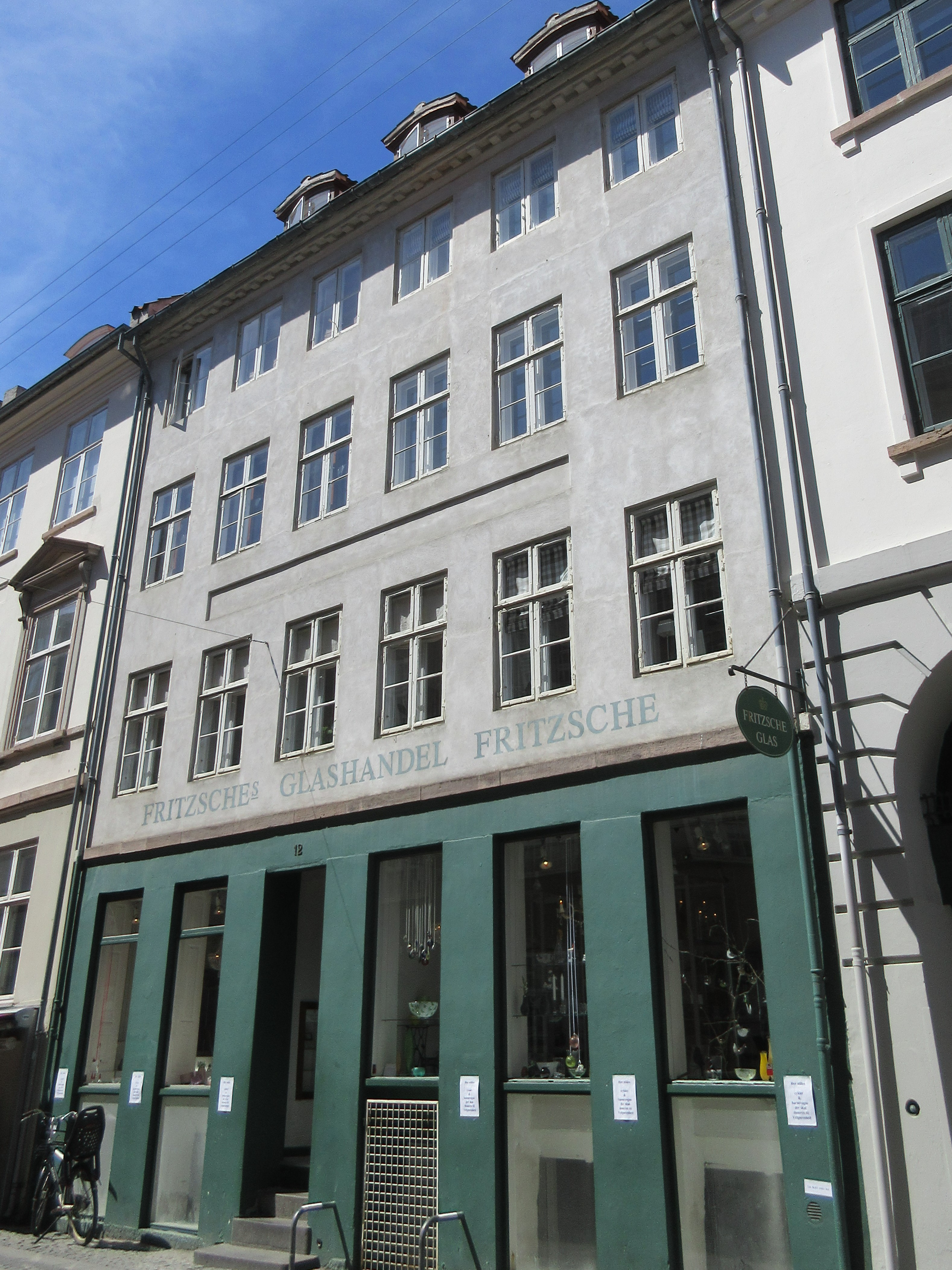
Simon Aron Eibeschütz

Kompagnistræde 12 is constructed with four storeys over a walk-out basement. The plastered facade is finished with a band of Neksø sandstone above the ground floor and a modillioned cornice below the roof. A depressed blank frieze is located between the four central windows of the second and third floors. It is painted in a dusty green colour on the ground floor and white on the upper floors. The inset main entrance is located in the fourth bay from the left. The basement entrance is located in the fifth bay.

== Today ==
The building is still owned by the Fritzsche family. The C. E. Fritzsche glass shop occupies the entire ground floor of the front wing. A repair workshop is located in the rear wing.
