= Nikolajgade 20 =

Listed building in Copenhagen

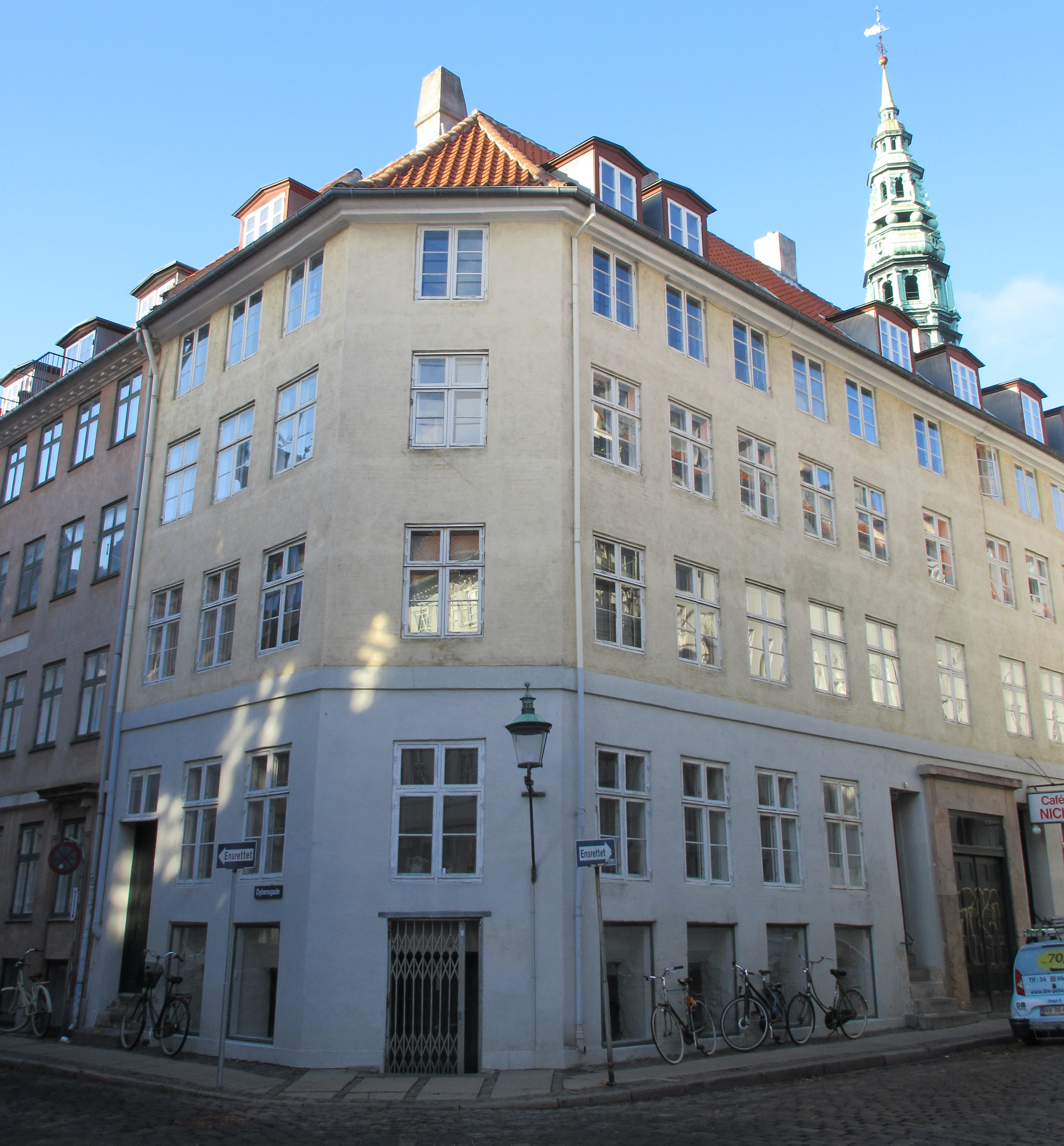
- Interactive map of the Nikolajgade 20 area

General information
- Location: Copenhagen, Denmark
- Coordinates: 55°40′41.2″N 12°34′56.82″E
- Completed: 1799-1800

Nikolajgade 20 / Dybensgade 20 is a Neoclassical apartment building situated at the corner of Nikolajgade and Dybensgade in central Copenhagen, Denmark. The building was constructed by master mason Anthon Christian Wilcken and master carpenter Andreas Hallander in 1799–1800 as part of the rebuilding of the city following the Copenhagen Fire of 1795. It was listed on the Danish registry of protected buildings and places in 1959. A young Hans Christian Andersen was the lodger of a widow on the second floor in the early 1820s. From 1825 to 1840 the building was operated as a home for indigent seamen under the name Bombebøssen. That institution—founded by the naval officer Peter Norden Sølling in 1819— was then moved to Christianshavn. The building at the corner of Nikolajgade and Dybensgade was hit by fire in 1855 but subsequently restored.

== History ==
=== 17th and 18th centuries ===
The site was formerly made up of two smaller properties. The corner property was listed in Copenhagen's first cadastre from 1689 as No. 179 in Eastern Quarter, owned by provost at Holmen Church Peder Ramløse. The adjacent property was listed as No. 178 in Eastern Quarter, owned by carpenter Niels Andersen.

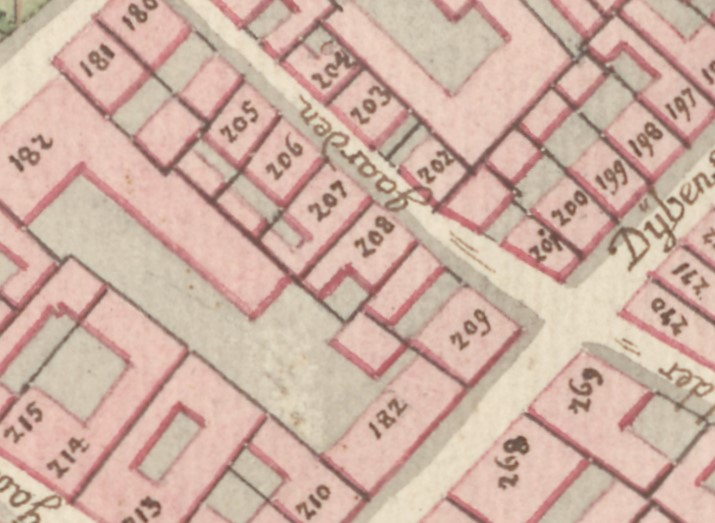
No. 208 and No. 809 seen on a detail from Christian Gedde's map of the East Quarter, 1757.

The old No. 178 was listed in the new cadastre of 1756 as No. 207, owned by musician Johan Christian Franch. The old No. 168 was listed as No. 209, owned by tailor Philip Becker.

No. 209 belonged to grocer (spækhøker) Jens Jensen at the time of the 1787 census. He lived in the building with his wife Karen Jensen, one maid, his wife's aunt Karen Espens Datter and three lodgers. The lodgers were a sailor, a tailor and a master tailor. No. 208 belonged to boatman Rasmus Sløyter at the 1787 census. He lived in the building with his wife Anna Kirstine, their two children (aged eight and 16), a lodger (a widow supported by his family) and one maid.

The two properties were both destroyed during the Copenhagen Fire of 1795, together with most of the other buildings in the area. The two fire plots were merged into a single property after the fire. The present building on the site was constructed by master mason Anthon Christian Wilckenand master carpenter Andreas Hallander in 1799–1900.

=== 100–1825 ===
No. 208(2+0 is for some reason not mentioned in the census records from 1801. The property was listed in the new cadastre of 1806 as No. 167 in Eastern Quarter, owned by one kancelliråd Paaske.

In 1821, around 1 September, Hans Christian Andersen took lodgings at Ulkegaden No. 108, second floor, with the wife of a naval officer, Madam Caroline Henckel. In 1822 he moved with Madam Henckel to Dybensgade No. 167.

=== Bombebøssenm 1825-1749 ===
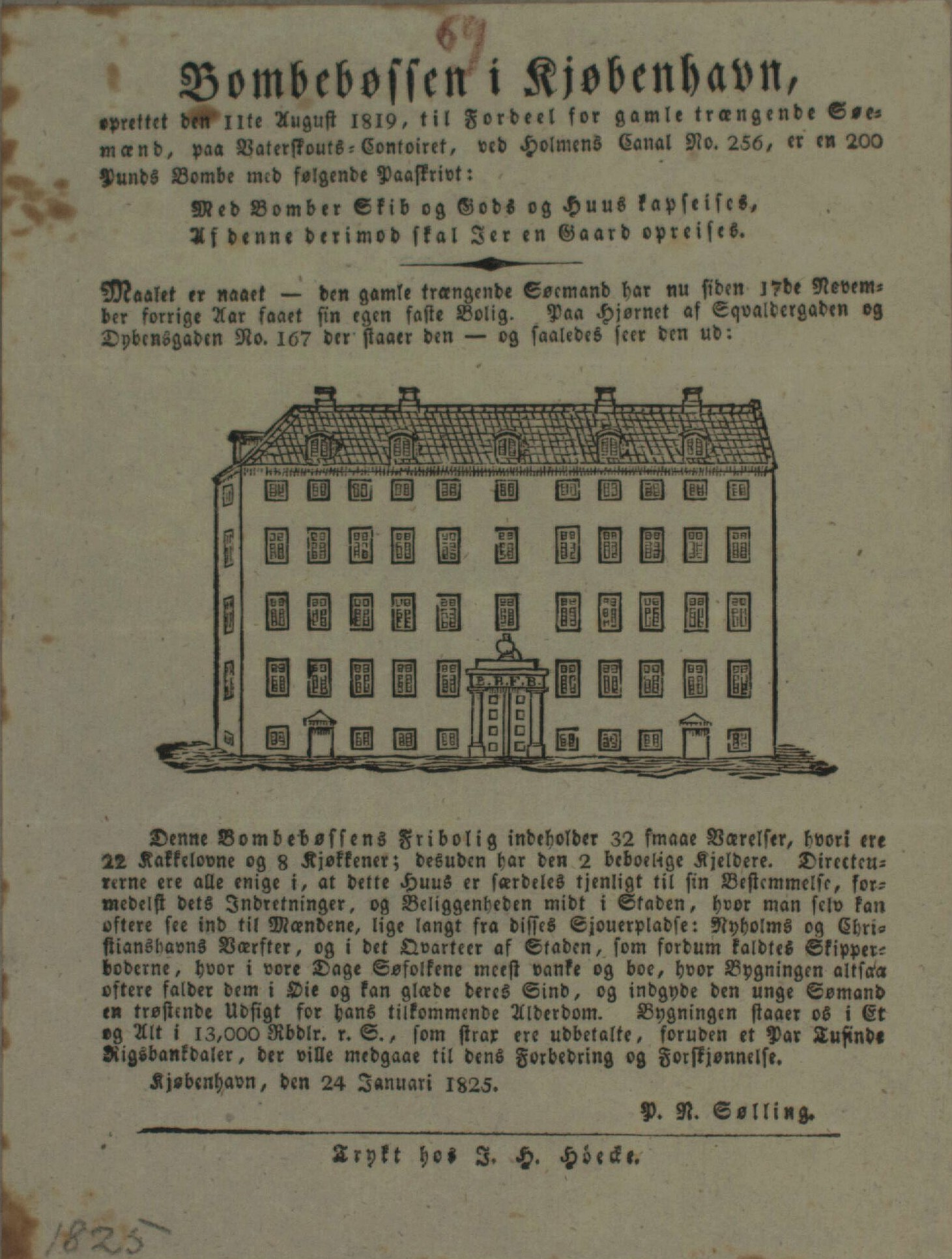
Bombebøssen in Dybensgade.

In 1825, Peter Norden Sølling acquired the property as a new home for Bombøssen. In his capacity as vaterskout in Copenhagen, he had been confronted with the miserable living conditions for old seamen after the Napoleonic Wars. In November 1819, he had received royal permission to collect money for the establishment of a home for indigent seamen. He had subsequently converted a British 200-pound bomb from the 1807 bombardment, which had been found in Dybensgade, into a collection box, installing it in the Skippers' Guild Hall in Ny Kongensgade. The institution first opened in two rented rooms at Wilders Plads in 1821. With the acquisition of the new building at the corner of Dubensgade and Skvaldergade, it has room for 50 residents.

The property was home to 80 residents at the 1840 census. Elisabeth Schaltz, widow of the inspector, resided in the building with her 11-year-old daughter Johanne Andrea Lund, one maid and the foundation's new inspector M. Haberbier. 50 men are listed as "residents of the foundation" (stiftelsen lemmer). Christian Bendal, a master klein smith, resided in the corner basement with two apprentices and one maid. Gabriel N. Aagaardm a joiner, resided in the other half of the basement with his wife Else Margrethe ad their two sons (aged nine and 16).

Later the same year, Nombebøssen moved to a new building in Brogade (No. 8) where the Ministry of Foreign Affairs stands today.

=== 1850 census ===
The property was home to 67 residents at the 1750 census- Peter Gustav Wilhelm Nyman, a boatman (bådfører), resided in the basement with his wife Maren Kirstine Olsen, their five children (aged one to 10), his sister Sophie Florentine Susanne Nyman and the workman Hans Nielsen. Niels Thuesen, a carpenter, resided in the other half of the basement with his wife Englitze Kirstine Thuesen and their four children (aged two to seven). Christian Herman William Schulthz, a wallpaper dyer, resided in one of the ground-floor apartments with his mother Anne Marie Schulthz (née Andersen, candle seller) and one maid. Lars Peter Lund, a master shoemaker, resided in the other ground-floor apartment with his wife Magdalene Kirstine Olsen, their five children (aged four to 24), his mother-in-law Engeborg Kjerstine Olsen, his sister-in-law Oline Petrine Olsen and niece Olaf Frits Theodor Olsen, master shoemaker Hans Peter Lund (partner), and four more shoemakers (employees). H. P. Gamelgaard, a skipper, resided in one of the first-floor apartments with his wife Lovise Marie and one maid. Jakob Frederik Hansen, a sailing master, resided in the other first-floor aoartment with his wife Andrea Bobætte Hansen, their three children (aged one to six), his father-in-law Jens Peter Østen and 22-year-old Ambolætte Juliane Østen. Jeppe Hendriksen, a soap maker, resided on the same floor with his wife Mette Sophie Hendriksen and their 21-year-old relative Thora Jörgensen. Meier Walli, a clerk, resided in one of the second-floor apartments . Peter Frederik Bistrup, a captain of a lightvessel, resided in the other second-floor apartment with his wife Caroline Bistrup, four children, another relative and one maid. Søren Laursen Zeuthen, a royal escort (kfl. forrider, "royal front-rider"), resided in one of the third-floor apartments with his wife Johanne Petersen, their two children (aged two and ten), a painter and a seamstress. Christiane Dorthea Larsen, a widow with a pension, resided in the other third-floor aoartment with her son Peter Lunding Larsen. Ole Erenst Peter Olsen, a shoemaker, resided in the garret with his wife Ane Kjerstine Hansen and their two children.

=== Later history ===
The building was again hit by fire in 1855 but subsequently rebuilt. The property was initially listed as Dybensgade 20/Skvaldergade 6 when house numbering by street was introduced in 1859 as a supplement to the old cadastrel numbers by quarter. In 1896, when Skvaldergade was renamed Nikolajgade, it was changed to 1896 Dybensgade 20/Nikolajgade 20.

The property was home to 30 residents at the 1880 census. Johan Frederik Koch. a master tailor, resided on the ground floor with his wife Marie Frederikke Norklidt, their 35-year-old son Eduard Ferdinand Koch (tailor), their 24-year-old son Johanne Marie Koch, their 20-year-old daughter Sofus Anton Villiam Koch and one maid. Rasmus Peder Nielsen, a pawner, resided on the first and second floor with his wife Betty Nielsen, their 28-year-old daughter Alvilda Nielsen, their 25-year-old son Carl Emil Nielsen and the floor clerk Amalie Elisabeth Olsen. Marie Louise Wiegell, a widow, resided on the second floor with her 27-year-old son Henry Leopold Meyer (piano tuner) and plumber Johan Frederik Bruun. Anine Cathrine Schottmann, an 85-year-old woman (daughter of Johan Bernhardt Schottmann (1734-1786), resided on the third floor with the 39-year-old woman Augusta Martine Borch and one maid. Agathe Dorothea Louise Astrup, a tailor, resided on the same floor with ticket inspector at the Royal Danish Theatre Carl Kisling. Constan Theophilius Ferdinand Køhn, a tailor, resided in the garret with his wife Marie Christine Køhn. Anders Larsen, a workman, resided in the garret with his wife Anne Margrethe Christine Larsen as well as the sailor Svend Hansen and Emilie Hansen (possibly wife or sister). Hans Jensen, a grocer (høker), resided in the basement with his wife Pouline Anna Jensen and three children (aged 13 to 16).

== Architecture ==
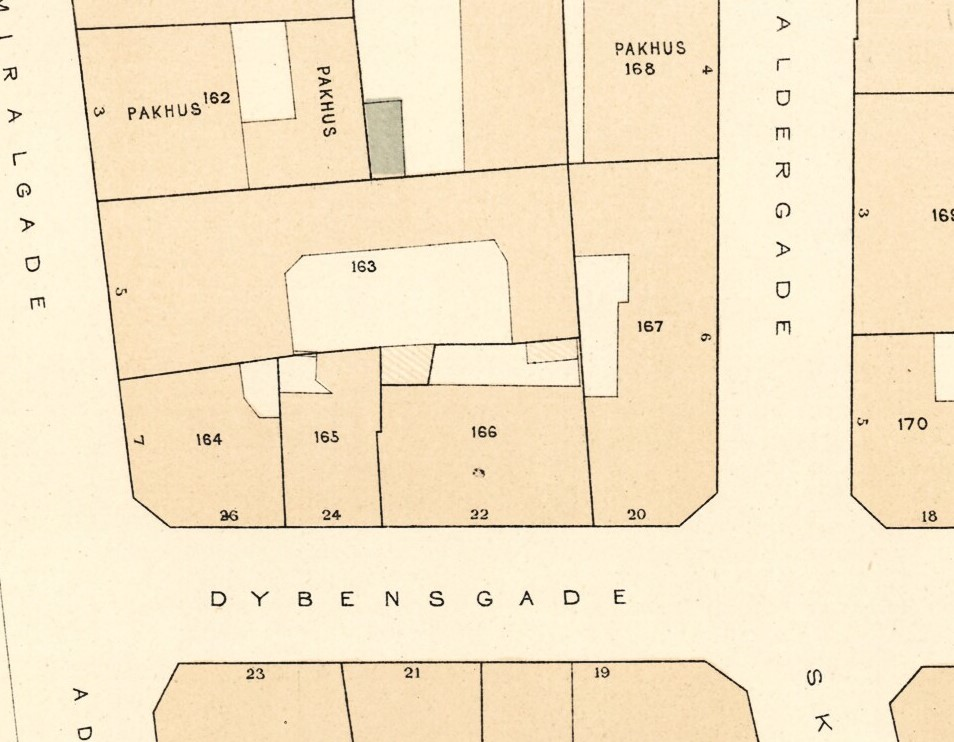
The property seen on a detail from one of Berggreen's block plans of Eastern Quarter, 1886–88.

Nikolajgade 20(Dybensgade 20 is a corner building constructed with four storeys over a walk-out basement. It has a three-bay-long facade towards Dybensgade, an 11-bay-long facade towards Nikolajgade and a chemfered corner. The chamfered corner bay was dictated for all corner buildings by Jørgen Henrich Rawert's and Peter Meyn's guidelines for the rebuilding of the city after the fire so that the fire department's long ladder companies could navigate the streets more easily. The central bay towards Nikolajgade features a gateway and is wider than the other bays. The gate is green-painted, topped by a lunette and accented by a portal in pinkish Neksø sandstone. The facade of the building is plastered and white-painted. It is finished with a wide cornice band above the ground floor and a two-part cornice. The roof is clad in red tiles.

A side wing extends from the rear side of the wing. The yardside of the building is plastered and rendered yellow with iron vitriol.

== Today ==
The building contains a café and a residential apartment on the ground floor and two residential apartments on each of the upper floors. The garret contains a single apartment.
