= Simon Aron Eibeschütz =

Jewish Danish businessman and philanthropist

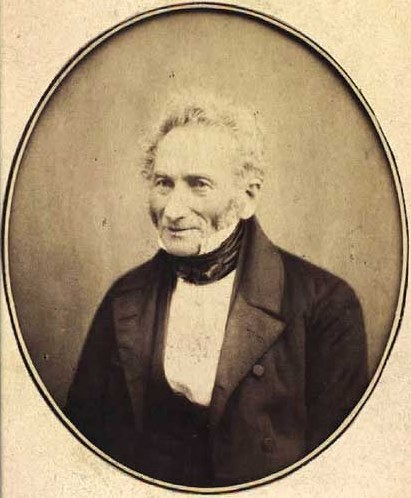
Simon Aron Eibeschütz by N. Willumsen.

Simon Aron Eibeschütz (14 November 1786 – 25 November 1856) was a Jewish Danish businessman and philanthropist.

== Early life and education ==
Eiberchutz was born on 14 November 1786 to merchant Aron Eibeschütz (c. 1736–1812) and Serie (Sara) Levy (c. 1740–1820). His father was originally from Eibenschitz in Mahren where his father was a rabbi. He had moved to Copenhagen in 1766. Simon was the youngest of five sons.

== Career ==
On 8 April 1807, Eiberchutz took citizenship as a commissioner. In the course of the next almost 30 years he succeeded in acquiring a large fortune.

At the 1840 census, he resided in the first-floor apartment of the Holm House on Gammeltorv.

In 1853, he was awarded the title of royal agent (Kgl. agent). In 1854, he was awarded the title of Councillor of Justice (Justitsråd).

== Personal life and legacy ==
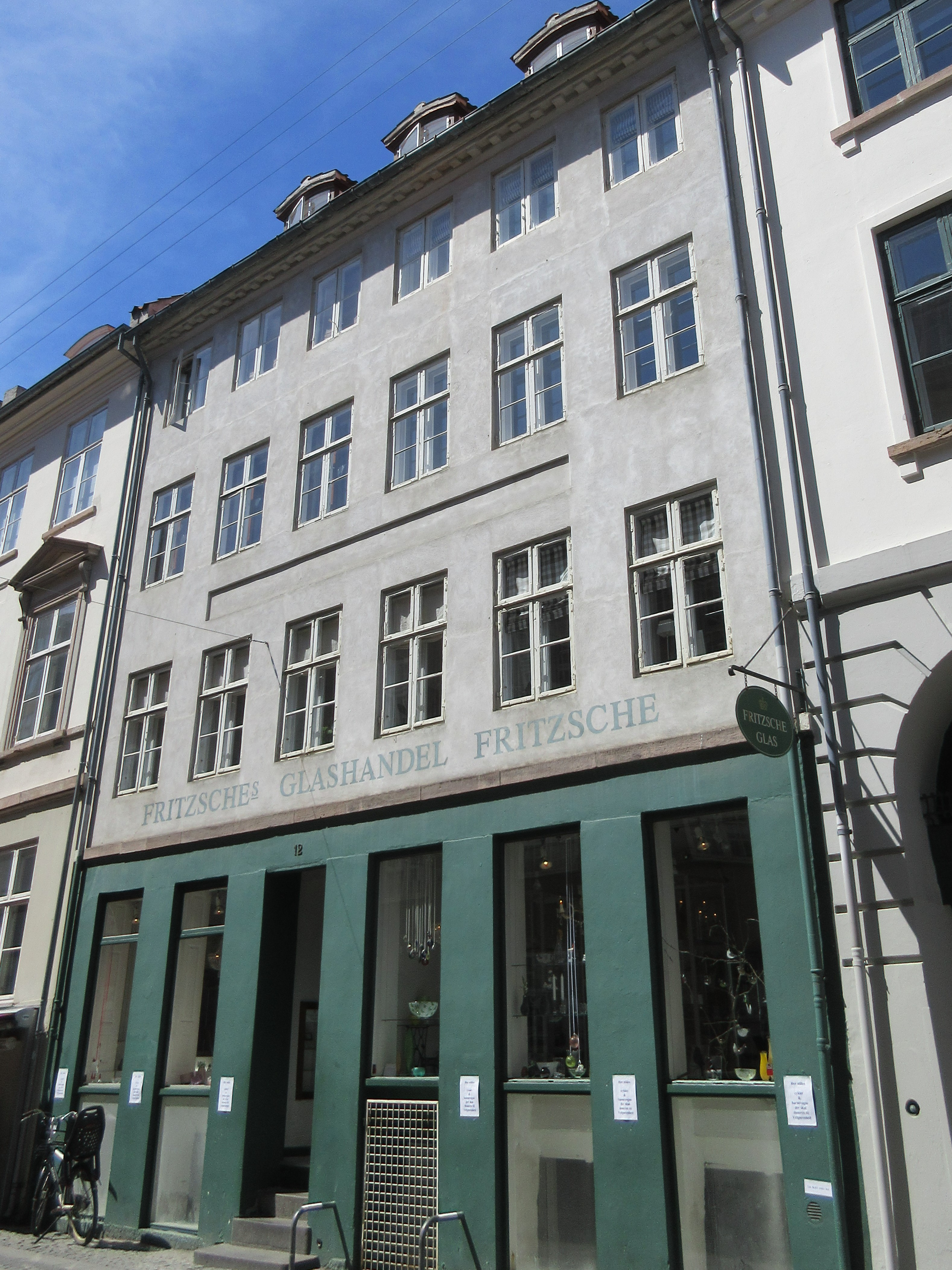
Kompagnistræde 12.

Eiberchutz was married twice. On 6 May 1807, he was married to Esther (Emma) Behrend (1787-1855). She was the daughter of businessman (stadsmægler) Behrend Israel Joachim (c. 1761–1821) and Dorothea Mariboe (1762–91). The marriage was later dissolved. On 11 February 1815, he was then married to Rose Wallich (1796–1870). She was a daughter of merchant Heiman Amsel Wallich (1767–1823) and Judithe Cohen (1773–1855).

Having no children, Eiberchutz and his second wife donated most of their wealth to charity. On 28 January 1834 (Frederik VI's birthday), he established a home for fifteen Jewish families (Kompagnistræde 12). He donated 10,000 Danish rigsdaler to Frederik's Hospital and a similar amount to needy patients of the Copenhagen Municipal Hospital. By testament of 25 June 1856, together with his wife, he donated his entire fortune(approx. DKK 1,250,000) for cultural and charitable purposes, both within and outside the Jewish community.

He died on 25 November 1856 and is buried at the Jewish Northern Cemetery.

In 1902, together with Melchiors Stiftelse, another Jewish home for the needy, Eibeschütz Stiftelse (Simon Aron Eibeschütz Fribolig) relocated to a new building at Ny Kongensgade 10-12.
