= Jacob Madsen =

Danish merchant, shipowner and builder

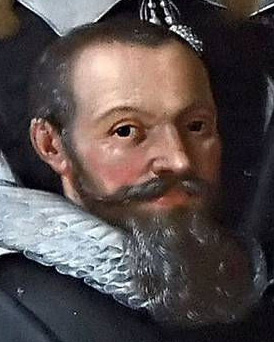
- Detail from oil painting in Church of Holmen
- Born: 1596; Visby, Gotland, Denmark
- Died: 21 May 1653 (aged 56–57); Copenhagen, Denmark
- Occupation: Businessman

Jacob Madsen (1596 – 21 May 1653) was a Danish merchant, shipowner and builder with close ties to the crown during the late reign of Christian IV. He was mayor of Christianshavn from 1641 to 1653.

== Career ==
Madsen was born in Visby on the island of Gotland. Nothing else is known about his early life but in 1625 he settled in Copenhagen where he was already a major supplier of timber from Gotland. He soon became one of the most important business partners of the crown, supplying it with timber and other building materials, farm supplies for the navy, munitions, and provisions.

Madsen was also involved in a number of major construction projects, usually in collaboration with others, such as Antvorskov, Copenhagen Castle, Church of Holmen, housing in Læderstræde and Nyboder, Christian IV's Brewhouse and the never completed Saint Anna Rotunda. In 1647, following a fire on Slotsholmen, he was charged with repair work on the Arsenal and Proviantgården.

In 1625–38, Madsen received 57,000 Danish daler in cash payments from the crown. In 1639–48, he received 181,000 Danish daler in cash payments. He was also paid with farm products from crown estates and received a cut of custom tariffs from Copenhagen, Ribe and Visby.

== Shipowner ==
Madsen was also the owner of a fleet of merchant ships. He was a stakeholder in the speculative Danish Baltic Company (Østersøiske kompagni) and his ships also sailed on Spain. In 1646, three of his ships were captured by Spanish privateers. He equipped four naval ships for the crown during the Torstensson War.

== Børsen ==
Madsen and a group of fellow merchants rented the Exchange Building in 1636. In 1642, he rented the building alone on a five-year lease. In 1647, Corfitz Ulfeldt ceded it to him in exchange for a 5,0000 daler reduction in his claims against the crown. The crown reacquired the building from his heirs in 1659 in exchange for estates in Jutland and on Funen.

== Christianshavn ==
Jacob Madsen was one of the wealthy citizens who received a lot in the new market town which was created on reclaimed land at the northern tip of Amager. His house was located in Strandgade (No. 10, now the Schottmann House). he served as mayor of Christianshavn from 1641 and until his death.

== Personal life and legacy ==
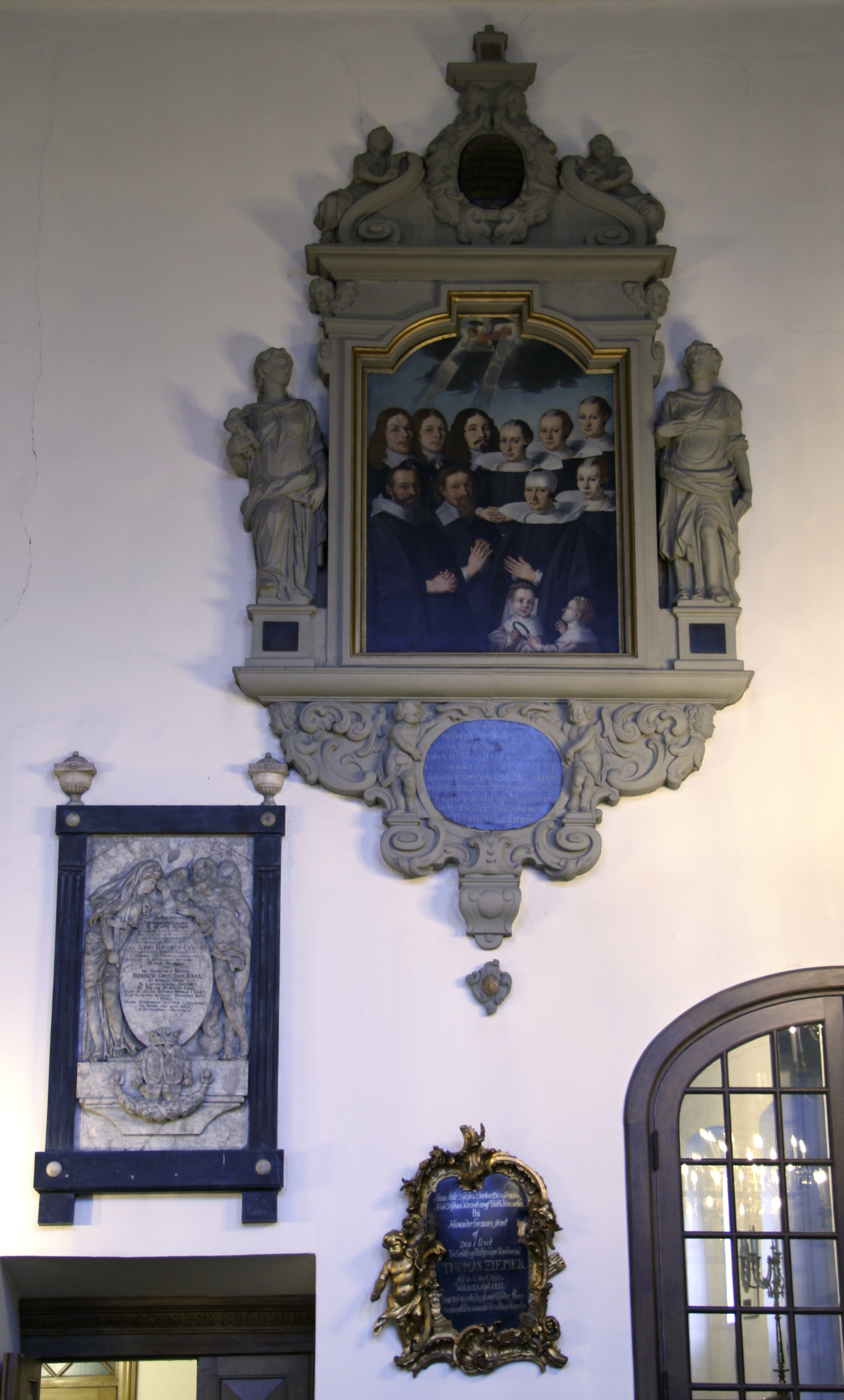
The Epitaph in Church of Holmen

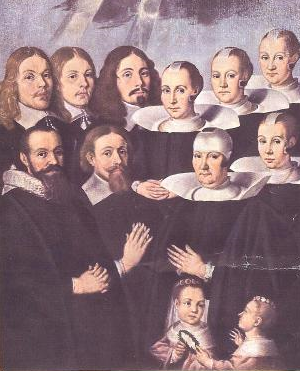
The oil painting from the epitaph

Madsen married Karen Eilersdatter (1591 in Vordingborg – 24 November 1674 in Copenhagen) in c. 1621. She was the daughter of customs officer and mayor of Vordingborg Eiler Jacobsen and his wife Margrethe Pedersdatter. Marsen was her second husband. Her first husband was Iver Bruun, hvis navn også hendes børn af 2. ægteskab antog), d. af borgmester og tolder i Vordingborg Eiler Jacobsen og Margrethe Pedersdatter.

Madsen is buried in Church of Holmen in Copenhagen. He is commemorated with a plaque to the left of the altar and an epitaph featuring his wife surrounded by her two consecutive husbands and children.
