= Holm House =

Building in Copenhagen, Denmark

- Holms Gård
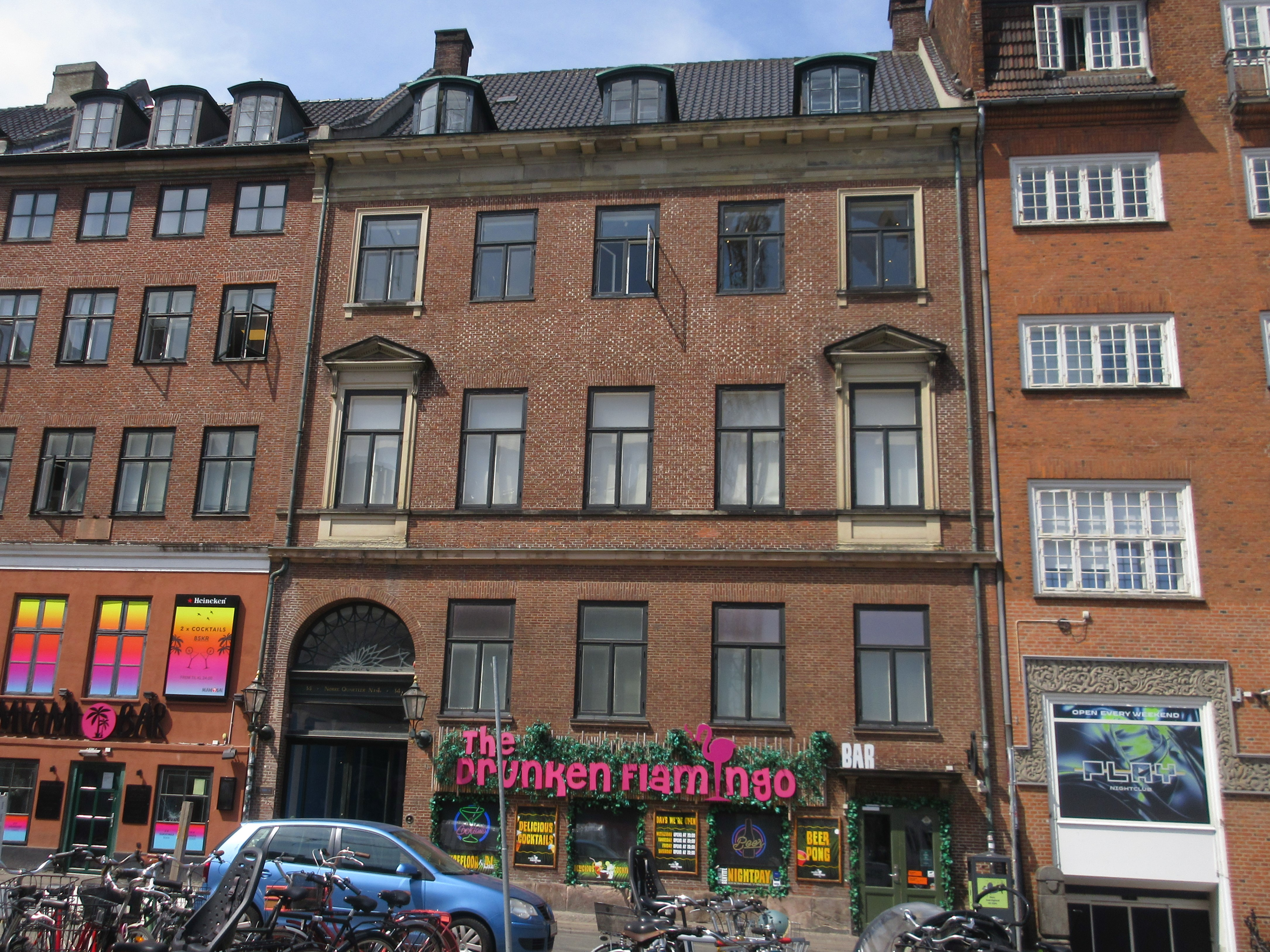
- Interactive map of the Holm House area

General information
- Location: Copenhagen, Denmark
- Coordinates: 55°40′42.01″N 12°34′18.35″E
- Completed: 1798
- Client: Hinrich Ladiges

The Holm House (Danish: Holms Gård) is a listed property located at Gammeltorv 14 in the Old Town of Copenhagen, Denmark. The building was listed on the Danish registry of protected buildings and places in 1926.

== History ==
=== Early history ===
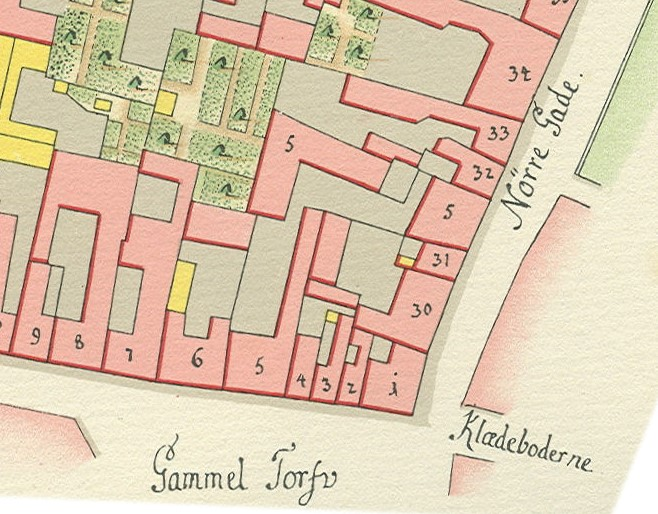
No. 5 seen on a detail from Christian Gedde's map of the North Quarter, 1757.

The property was in the late 17th century part of a larger property. In Copenhagen's first property of 1789, it was listed as No. 5. It was by then owned by councilman Hans Knudsen Leegaard.

After the Copenhagen Fire of 1728, the property was acquired by Abraham Pelt. He subsequently moved his sugar refinery from Christianshavn to his new property on Gammeltorv. In the new cadastre of 1756, the property was again listed as No. 5. It was by then still owned by Pelt.

=== Hinrich Ladiges and his sugar refinery ===
The property was acquired by Hinrich Ladiges in circa 1757. He had until then been the owner of a sugar refinery in Viborg. He continued the sugar refinery in the new location. As of the 1787 census, he resided in the building with an office clerk, 14 sugar refineryworkers, a coachman, a housekeeper, a male servant and two maids.

Ladiges' property was destroyed in the Copenhagen Fire of 1795, together with most of the other buildings in the area. The present buildings on the site were built for Ladiges in 1798. At the time of the 1801 census, Ladiges resided in the building with the office clerk Niels Møller, a housekeeper, a maid, a female cook, a coachman and a caretaker.

Ladiges died as one of the wealthiest men in the country in 1805 In the new cadastre of 1806, the property was listed as No. 4.

=== 1806–1839 ===
Another successful merchant, Lauritz Nicolai Hvidt, lived in the building from 1808 to 1809. He would later become one of the largest shipowners in the country and manager of Bank of Denmark from 1835 and until his death. His next home was at Østergade 22 (demolished). In 1811, he bought the property at Kronprinsessegade 28 and lived there until his death 35 years later.

=== 1840s and 1850s ===
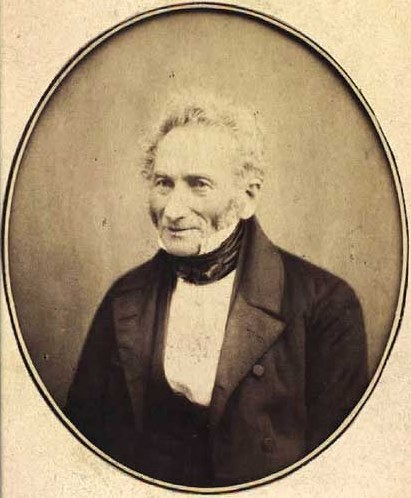
Simon Aron Eibeschütz by N. Willumsen.

At the time of the 1840 census, No. 4 was home to four households. Simon Aron Eibeschütz, a Jewish businessman, resided on the first floor with his wife Rose Eiberchutz (née Vallich), the 60-year-old widow Judutte Vallich, the 17-year-old girl Frederikke Abrahamsen, a housekeeper, a maid and a male servant. Jens Claus Hansen, a member of the University of Copenhagen's government body (Konsistorium), resided on the second floor with his four children (aged six to 15), a housekeeper, one male servant and one maid. Hans Nicolai Zøylner, a 37-year-old tea and porcelain merchant, resided in the basement with one servant. Ane Chatrine Backer, a 64-year old widow and the building's concierge, was also resident in the basement with her 23-year-old daughter.

The linguist Vilhelm Thomsen was born in the building on 25 January 1842. He was a professor of comparative linguistics at the University of Copenhagen from 1887 to 1913 and was awarded the Order of the Elephant in 1912 as one of few non-royal recipients in modern times.

At the time of the 1850 census; no. 4 was again home to four households. Simon Aron and Rose Eibeschutz still lived in the ground-floor apartment. Carl Frederik Normann, a birk judge with title of justitsråd, resided on the first floor with his wife Thormine Funder, their three children (aged 19 to 23), one male servant and two maids. Frederik Wilhelm Emil Lange, a man with means, resided on the second floor with his wife Emilie Lange, his sister Elisabeth Lange and two maids. Niels Christensen Aggerup. the building's concierge, resided in the basement with his wife Magdalene Jensen, their three-year-old son, a lodger and a servant.

=== Christian Holm ===
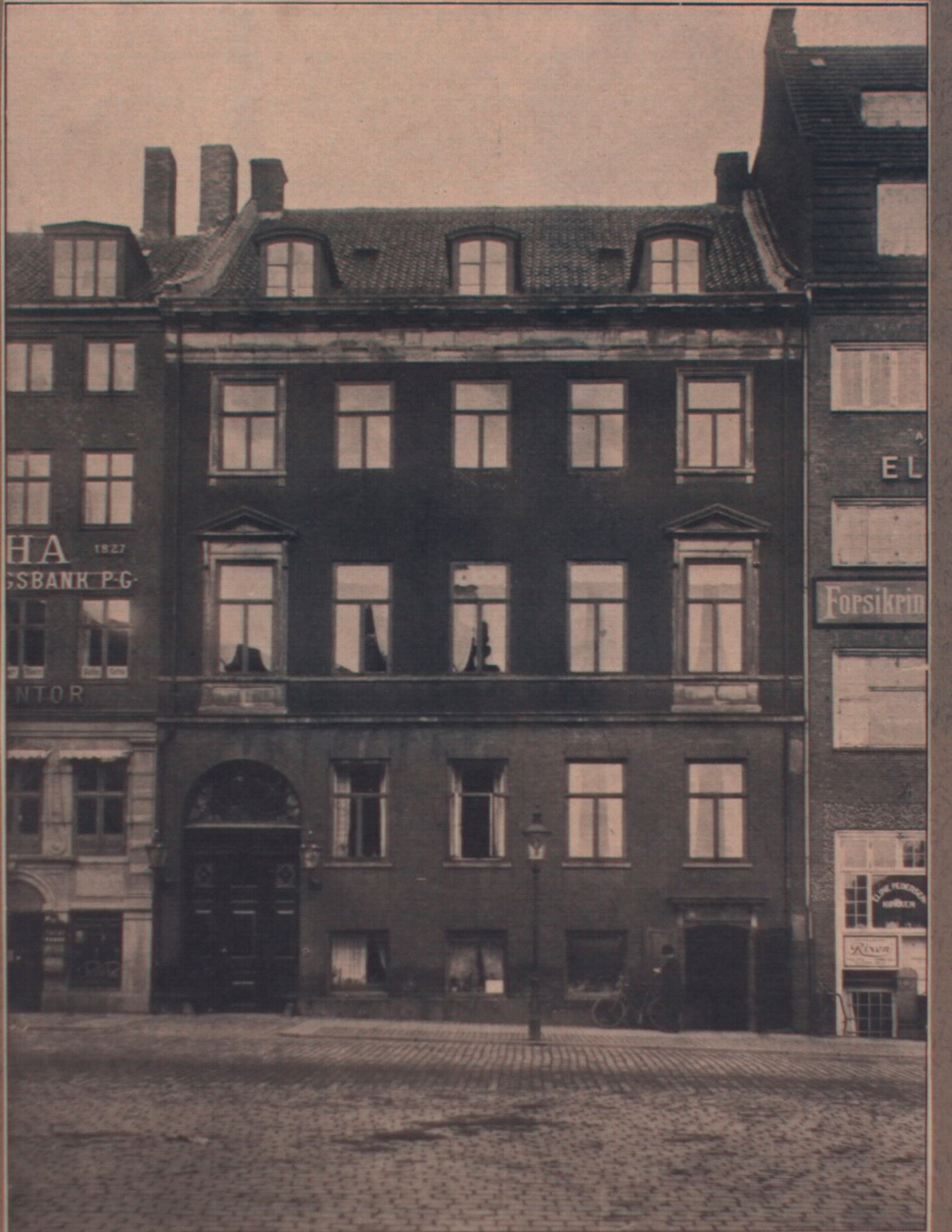
Gammeltorv 14 photographed by Peter Elfelt

The property was later acquired by the businessman Christian Holm (1807-1876), a son of the business Jacob Holm. Christian Holm and Rosa Eibechutz were both residents in the building at the 1860 census. It is therefore not clear weather Holm had already acquired the building at this point or if it was not sold to him until after Rosa Eibechutz's death. Christian Holm lived in the building with his wife Sophie Magdalene Holm (née Corneliussenm 1809-1881), their three children (aged 12 to 25), one male servant and three maids.

Rosa Eibechutz resided on the second floor with her niece Galathea Berendt, a husjomfru and a maid. Adelgunde Vogt (née Herbst, widow of the diplomat Frederik Siegfried Vogt (1777–1855) and an accomplished sculptor, resided on the first floor with two sons (aged seven and 11), her sister Thora Natalie Herbst, her niece Ophelia Gerstenborg, one male servant, three maids and a coachman. Christian Bentsen, the building's concierge, resided in the basement with his wife Inger Bentsen f. Jensen and their two children.

== Architecture ==
The building facing the square stands in undressed, red brick with sandstone detailing. It is five bays wide and consists of three floors over a high cellar. The gateway opens to a courtyard surrounded by three perpendicular buildings and a rear wing.

== Commemorative plaques ==
A plaque on the facade of the building Commemorates thatVilhelm Thomsen] was born in the building. It was installed on his 101-year birthsday on 25 January 1943. Inside the gateway is a Commemorative plaque that lists all the names of owners of the site since the 15th century.

== Today ==
The Drunken Flamingo, a cocktail bar, is based in the ground floor. Holm & Bertung, a PR agency founded in 1996, is based on the second floor.
