= Søkvæsthuset =

Building in Copenhagen, Denmark

Royal Naval Hospice
- Søkvæsthuset
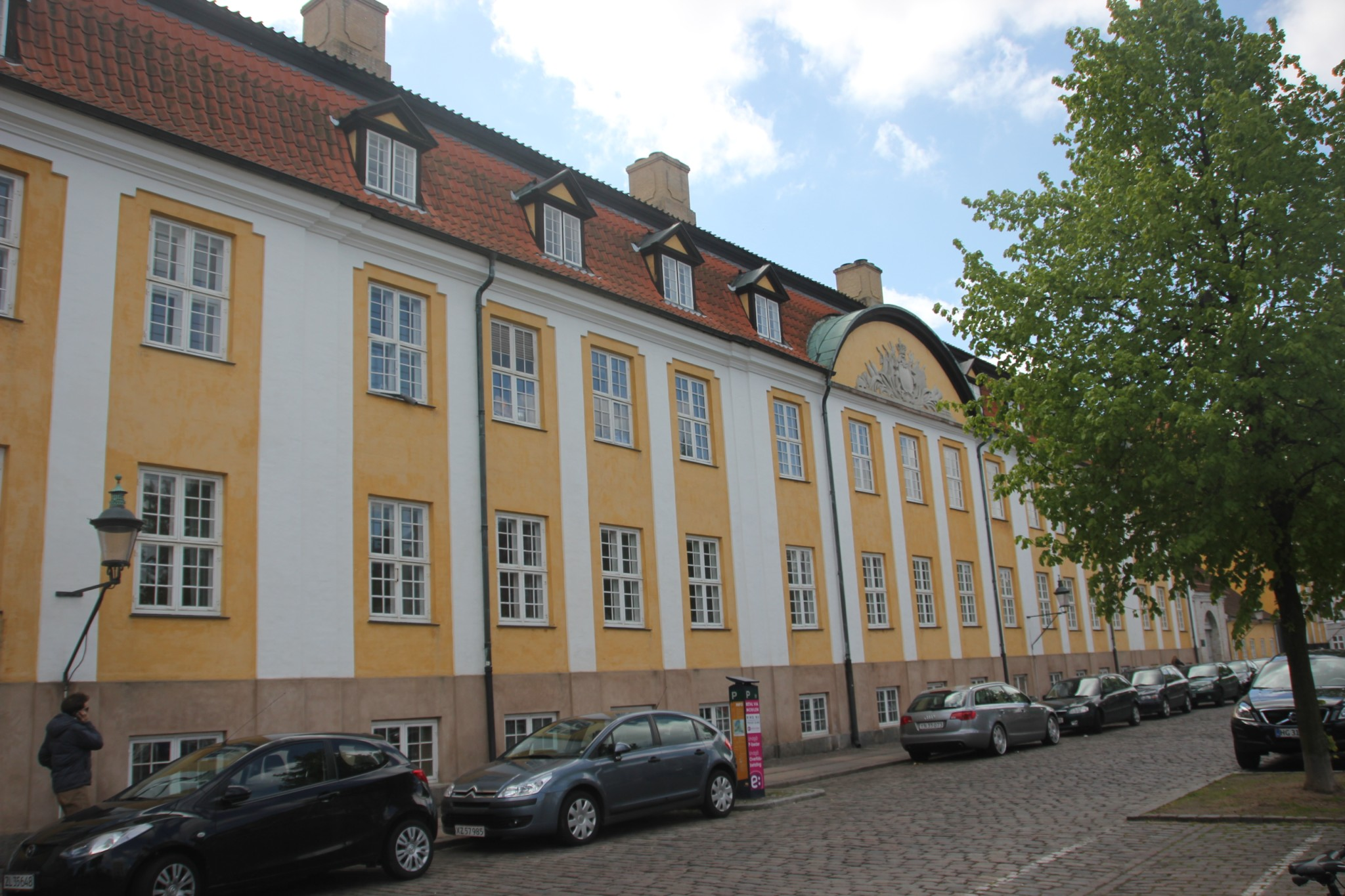
- The facade towards the canal
- Interactive map of the Royal Naval Hospice area

General information
- Architectural style: Baroque
- Location: Copenhagen, Denmark
- Coordinates: 55.6742°N 12.5945°E
- Completed: 1755

Design and construction
- Architect: Johan Christian Conradi

Søkvæsthuset is a former Naval hospice located on Christianshavn Canal in the Christianshavn district of Copenhagen, Denmark. The listed building housed the Royal Danish Naval Museum until 2016. The collection has been moved to and is exhibited at the Arsenal Museum (Tøjhusmuseet) at Christiansborg.

== History ==
=== Earlier locations ===
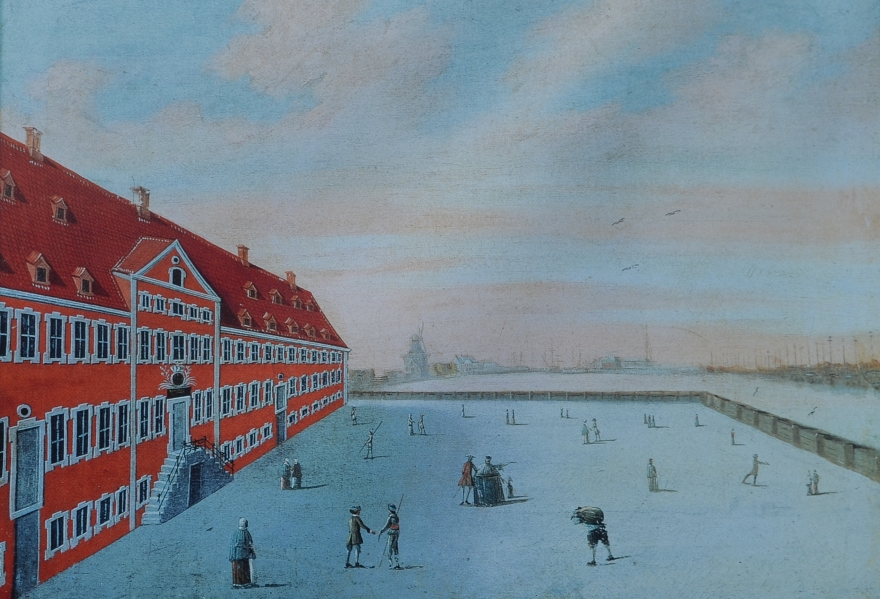
Kvæsthuset in c, 1750

It is known that a hospital for boatsmen was founded in 1618, most likely at Church of Holmen. It was moved to Gothersgade in 1628 and again in 1658 to Sejlhuset at Bremerholm. In 1668, the hospital moved to Børnehuset in Christianshavn and in 1675 to Guldhuset in Rigensgade.

The name Kvæsthus was introduced with the inauguration of a new building for the institution at present day Sankt Annæ Plads in 1685. It was designed by Hans van Steenwinckel the Youngest. The institution was later split into a Søkvæsthus for the Navy which remained in the old building and a Landkvæsthus for the Army, which took over Københavns Ladegård, a former farm under Copenhagen Castle.

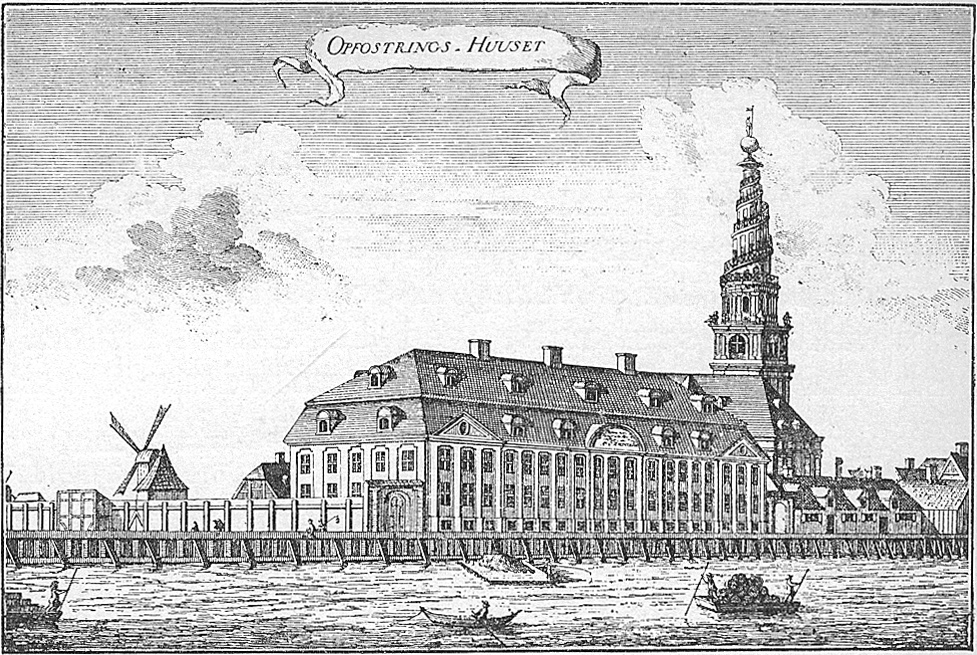
The Royal Naval Hospice shortly after its completion in 1766

=== At Christianshavn Canal ===
The current building was originally built as a royal orphanage (Opfostringshuset) in 1754-1755. The architect and builder was Johan Christian Conradi.

The Royal Naval Hospital took over the building when the Royal Orphanage moved to Store Kongensgade in 1775. Johan Bernhardt Schottmann expanded the building with a new wing on Bådsmandsstræde in 1780-1781.

=== The Heiberg's home ===
A garden house was built by the architect G. E. Rosenberg in 1779. It was rebuilt after a fire in 1838. The poet and professor Johan Ludvig Heiberg together with his wife, the actress Johanne Luise Heiberg, had his home in the building from 1844 until his death in 1860. It was frequented by many of the leading writers, politicians, priests and other cultural figures of the day. Johan Ludvig Heiberg's mother, Thomasine Gyllembourg who was also a writer, also lived in the house from 1844 until her death.

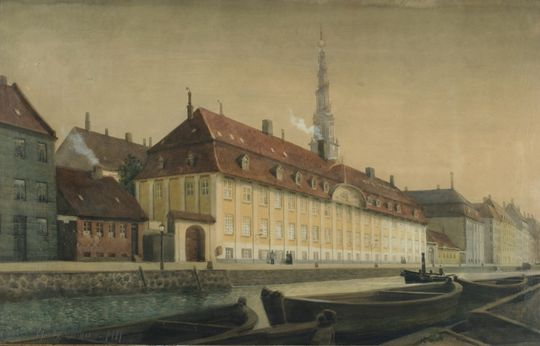
The Bådsmandsgade wing

=== Later use ===
The Danish Maritime Safety Administration was based in the building from its formation in 1973 until its abolition in 2011.

== Architecture ==
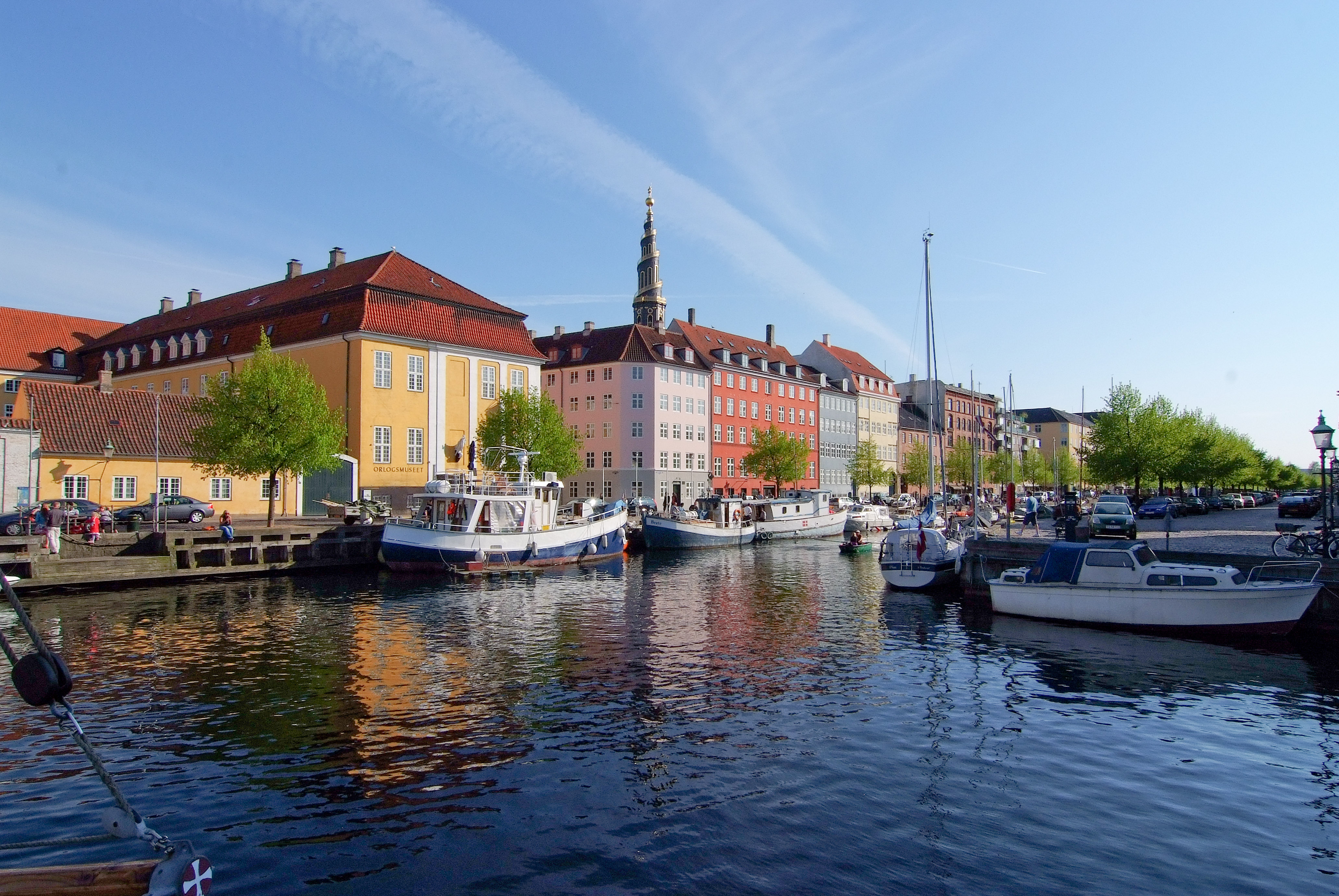
The Bådsmandsgade wing

The long building stands in yellow-dressed masonry with light grey pilasters. The rounded pediment is decorated with war trophies.

== Current use ==
The Royal Danish Naval Museum was located in the Bådsmandsstræde wing.
