= Asiatisk Plads =

Area of Copenhagen, Denmark

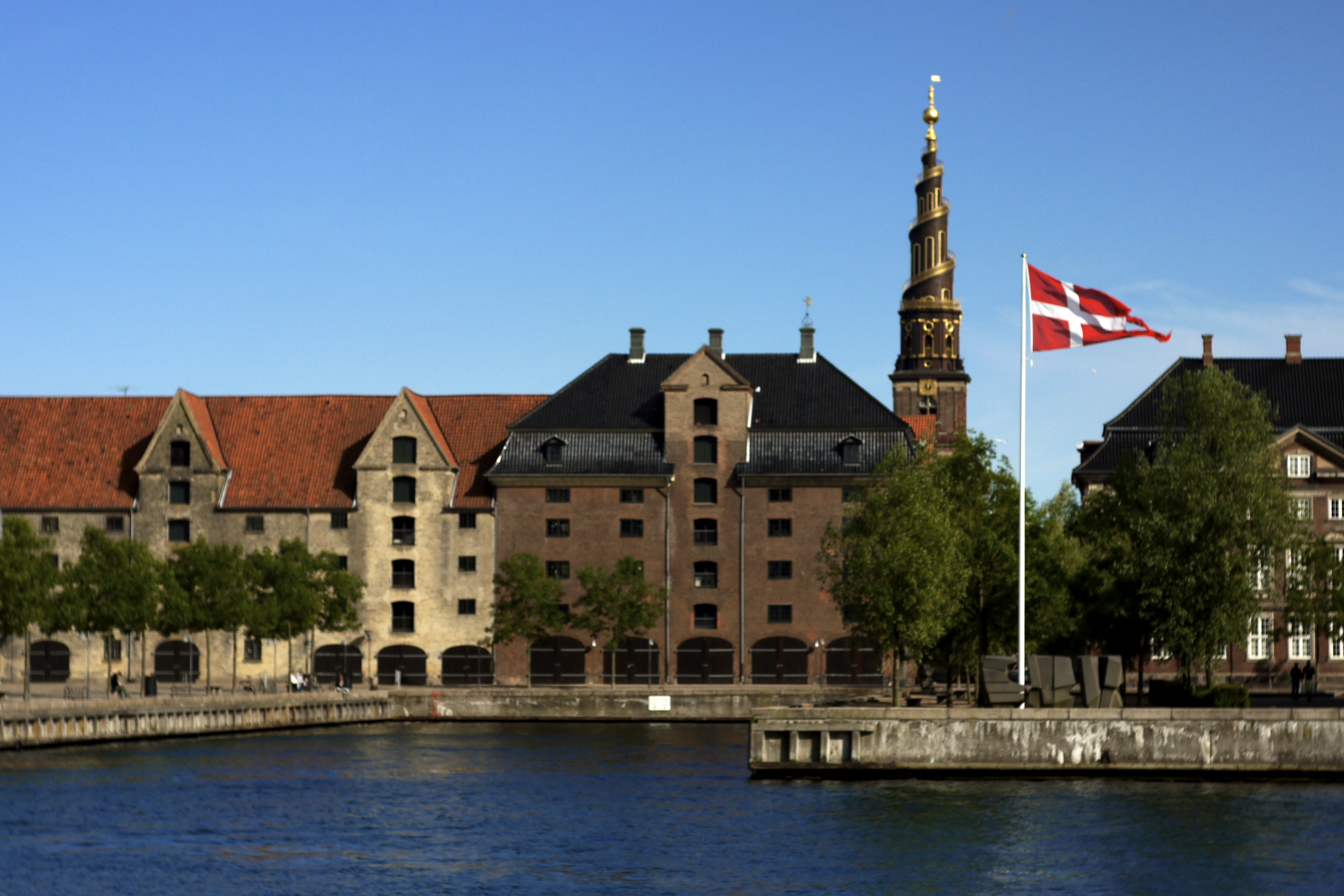
Asiatisk Plads seen from the Inner Harbour

Asiatisk Plads is a waterfront area by the Inner Harbour in the Christianshavn neighbourhood of Copenhagen, Denmark. It is bounded by Torvegade to the south, next to Knippel Bridge, Strandgade to the east and the Old Dock area to the north. It takes its name from the Danish Asiatic Company which was based at the site from its foundation in 1732 until 1843 when it was dissolved. The Ministry of Foreign Affairs is now based in the area, in a purpose-built office complex from 1980 as well as in the surviving buildings of the Danish Asiatic Company, its former head office and two converted warehouses, all of which are listed. Asiatisk Plads is frequently used as a metonym for the Ministry.

== History ==
=== Danish Asiatic Company ===
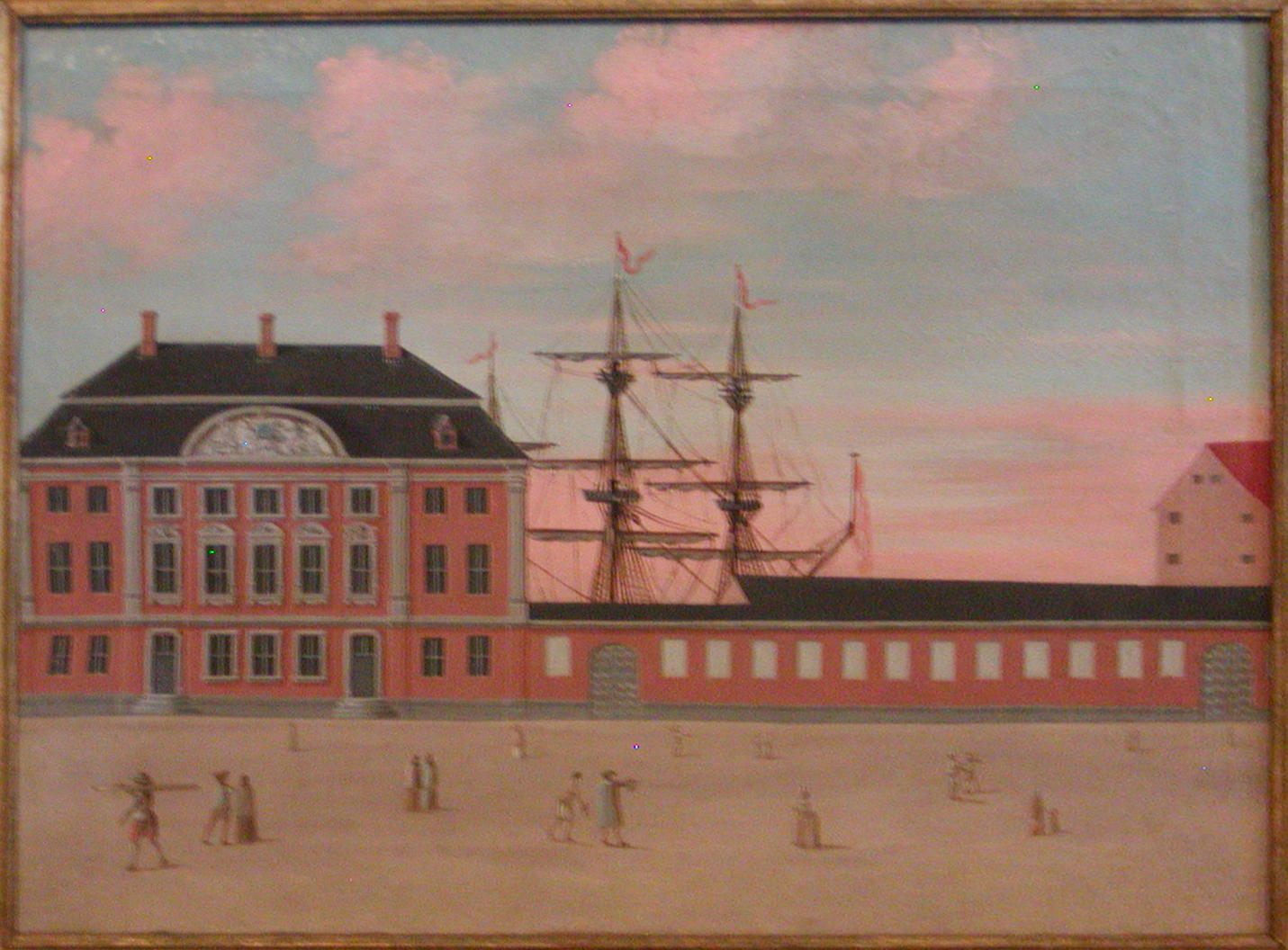
The Danish Asiatic Company painted by Johannes Rach & H.H. Eegberg

Danish Asiatic Company was founded in 1732 as a replacement for the Danish East India Company which had been dissolved in 1729. A head office for the company was built at a site just south of Old Dry Dock in 1738 to a design by Philip de Lange. The complex was later expanded with the addition of two warehouses.

=== Jacob Holm & Sønner ===
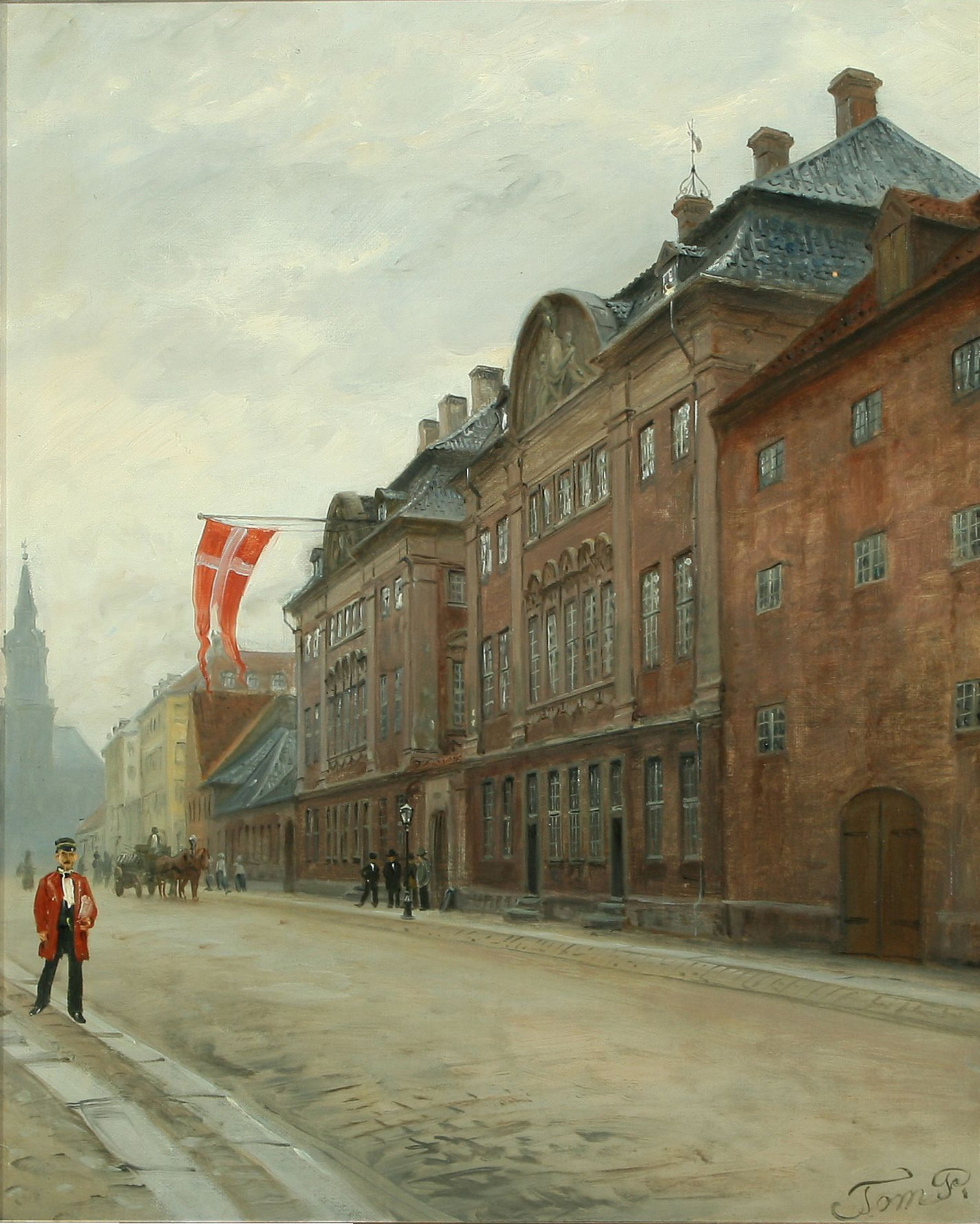
Danish Asiatic Company seen from the street in a painting from c. 1888

The Danish Asiatic Company was dissolved in 1843 and the company's premises at Christianshavn were then acquired by Jacob Holm, owner both of a shipyard and what had grown to be the largest shipping company in the country at the time.

=== Danish Ministry of Foreign Affairs ===
The southern part of the grounds was redeveloped in 1978-1980 when a new home was built for the Ministry of Foreign Affairs to designs by Haldor Gunnløgson (1918–1985) and Jørn Nielsen (1919–1996). The complex consists of three buildings with gables facing the water in accordance with the traditions for warehouses. Their monotonous Modernist designs have been heavily criticized.

== Architecture ==
=== Strandgade 25 ===
Philip de Lange's former head office for the Danish Asia Company is designed in the Late Baroque style. The facade is decorated with a relief, probably by Johann Christoph Petzold, featuring Neptune.

A short wall with a gate connects the building to a warehouse which was built at the neighbouring site in 1781 to a design by J. B. Schottmann. To achieve symmetry, the warehouse has a facade similar to that of the head office in terms of proportions and facade pattern while it is a typical warehouse as seen from the water.

=== Eigtved's Warehouse ===
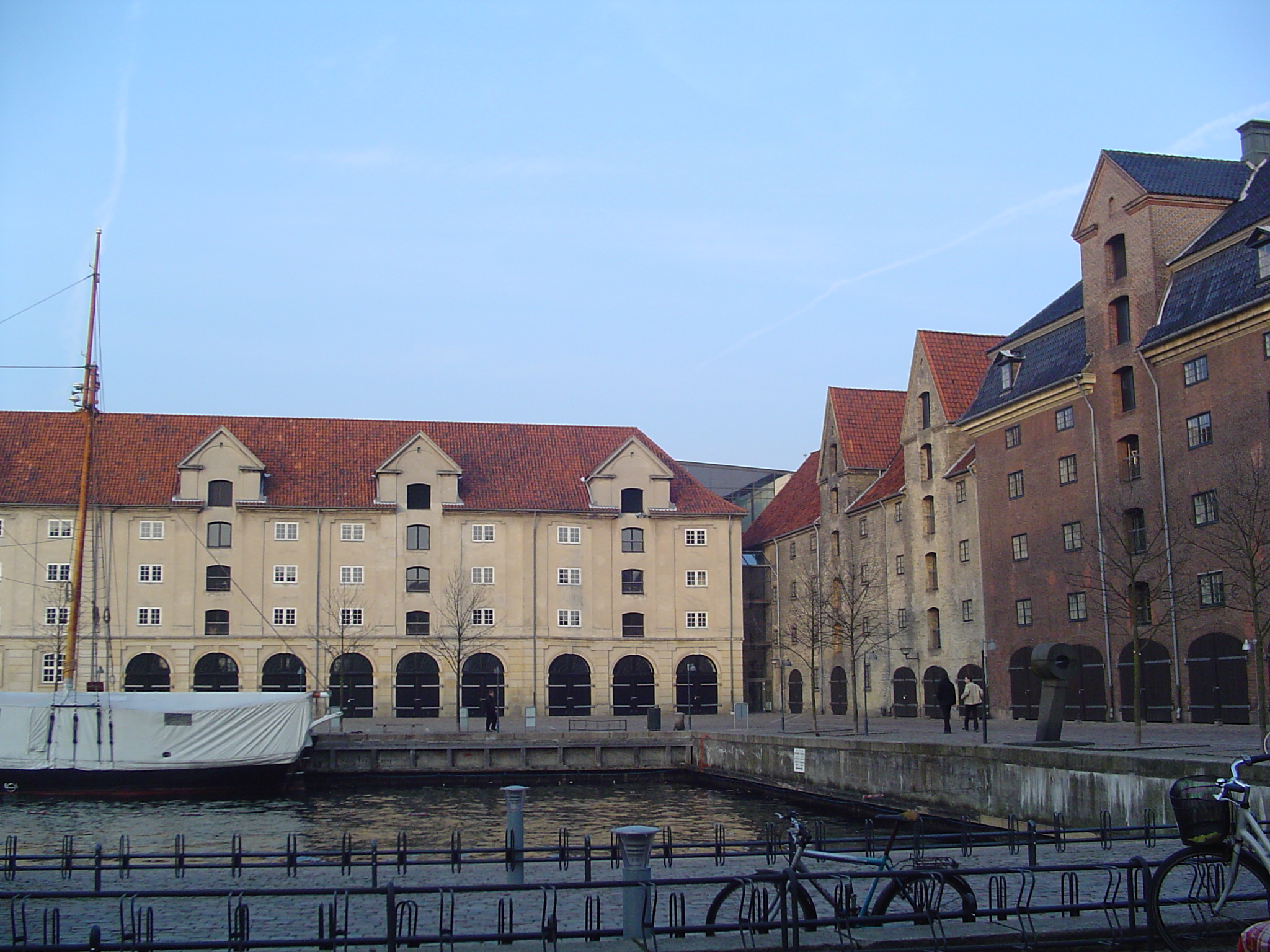
Asiatisk Plads

The site also includes the Eigtved Warehouse which was built for the Danish Asia Company from 1748 to 1750. It is named after its architect, Nicolai Eigtved, who was responsible for the planning of Frederiksstaden around the same time as well as for many prominent buildings such as Amalienborg Palace.

=== Modern buildings ===
Erik Møller Architects refurbished all three buildings and adapted them to the needs of the Foreign Ministry between 1979 and 1982.

== Public art, monuments and memorials ==
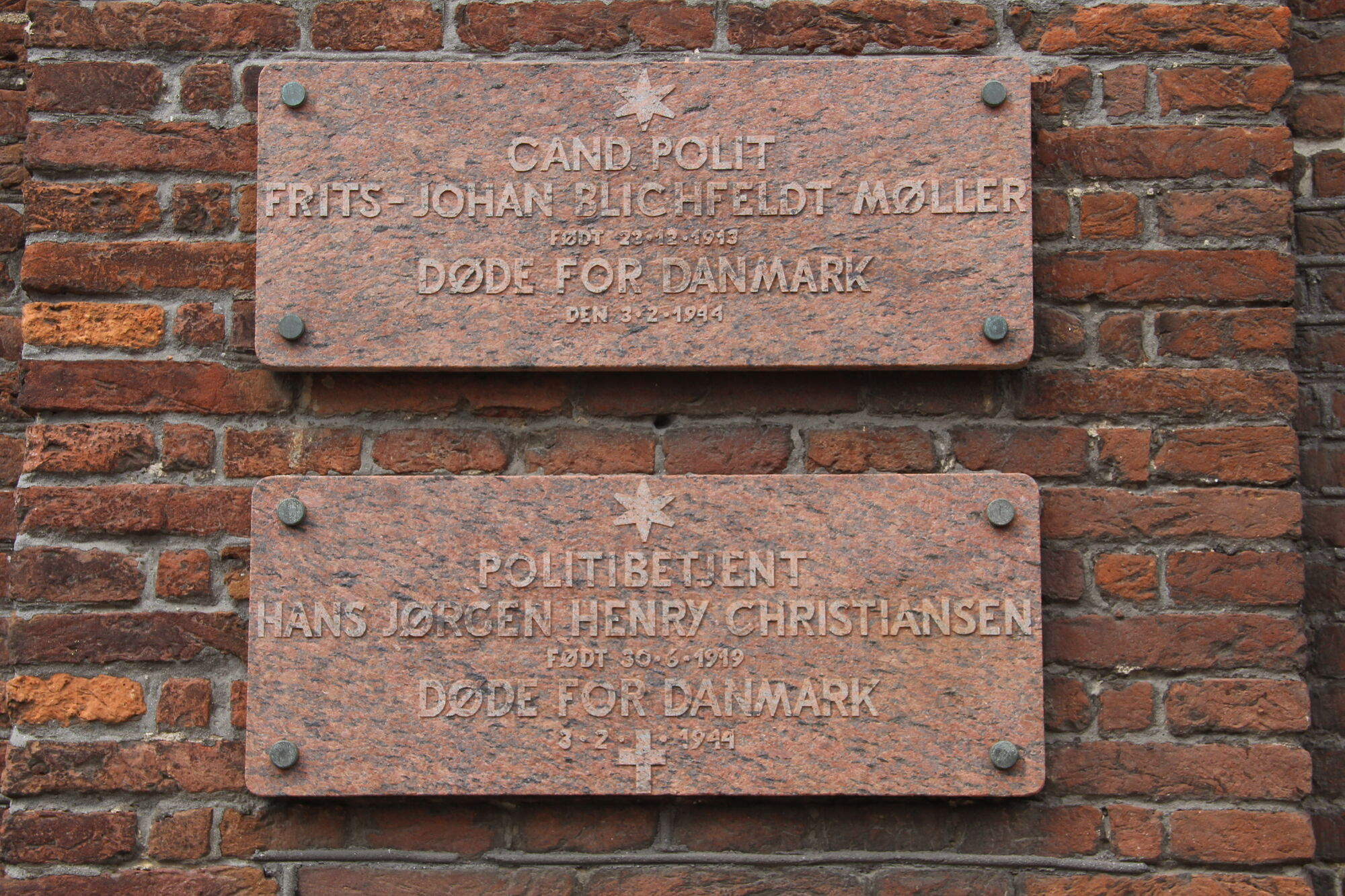
Commemorative plaques.

The quay features three abstract sculptures by Søren Georg Jensen: The Cyclop (Kyklopen), The Long Journey (Den Lange Rejse) and Figurehead (Galionsfigur).

Bright Bimpong's sculpture Freedom was installed on the guay in 2019. Iy symbolizes the enslaved Africans rebellion qaginst Denmark

Two plaques commemorate Frits-Johan Blichfeldt Møller and Hans Jørgen Henry Christiansen, two members of the Danish resistance movement, who were shot on the site by the Germans during World War II.

== See also ==
- Wilders Plads
