= Gammel Dok (building) =

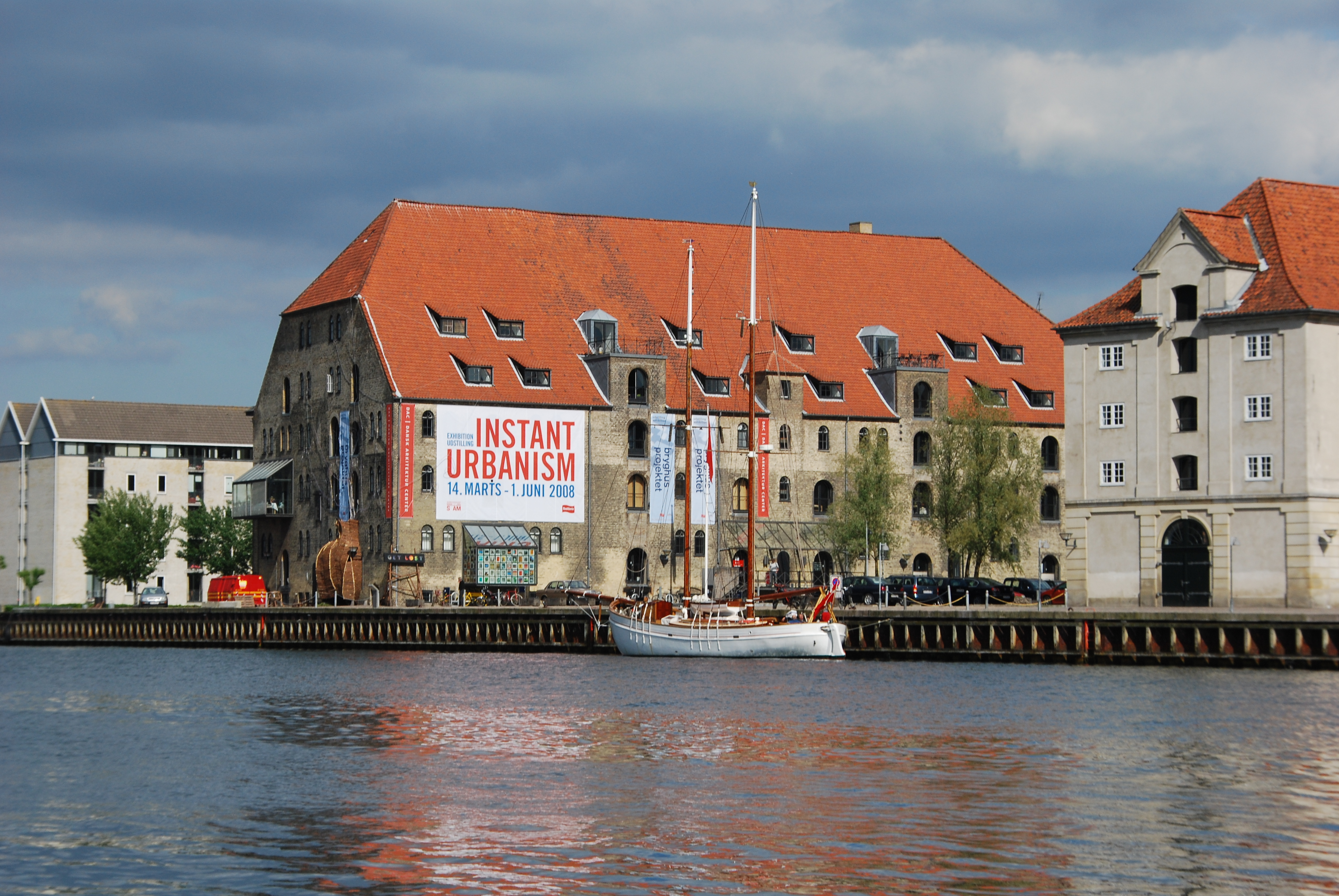
- Gammel Dok seen from the Harbour
- Interactive map of the Gammel Dok area

General information
- Location: Christianshavn, Copenhagen, Denmark
- Coordinates: 55°40′32.84″N 12°35′28.69″E
- Completed: 1882

Design and construction
- Architect: H. C. Scharling

Gammel Dok is a former warehouse located on the waterfront of the Inner Harbour in the Christianshavn neighbourhood of Copenhagen, Denmark. It now houses the National Workshops for Art.

== History ==
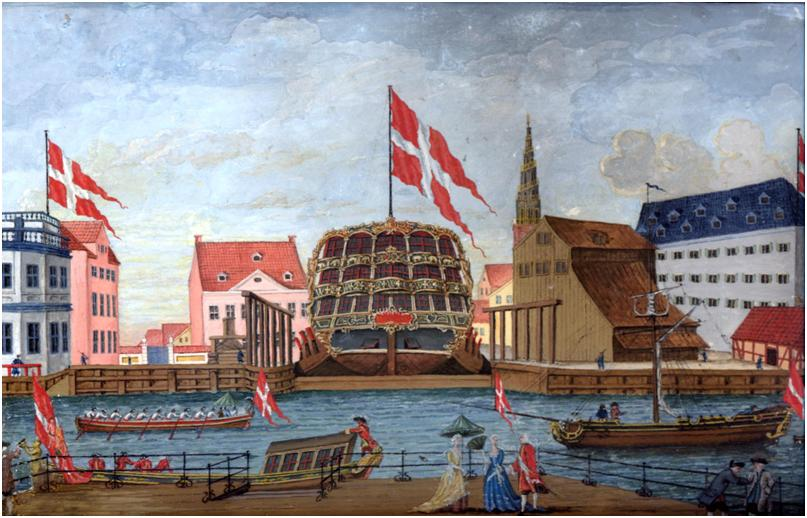
A ship in the dry dock in c. 1750, Royal Danish Naval Museum

Gammel Dok takes its name from Gammel Dok (en. Old Dock), Denmark's first dry dock which was located at the site from 1739 until 1919. It was built for De Forenede Oplagspladser og Værfter i Kjøbenhavn in 1882 to the design of the architect H. C. Scharling and extended with an extra floor around 1920.

The building was acquired by the Danish state in 1979. It was restored and adapted for use as an exhibition space by Erik Møller Architects ( Jens Fredslund) in 1985.

== Gammel Dok today ==
Until 2018 Gammel Dok housed the Danish Architecture Centre in the part of the building which faces the water. The other end of the building, towards Strandgade, houses the National Workshops for Art (da. Statens Værksteder for Kunst).

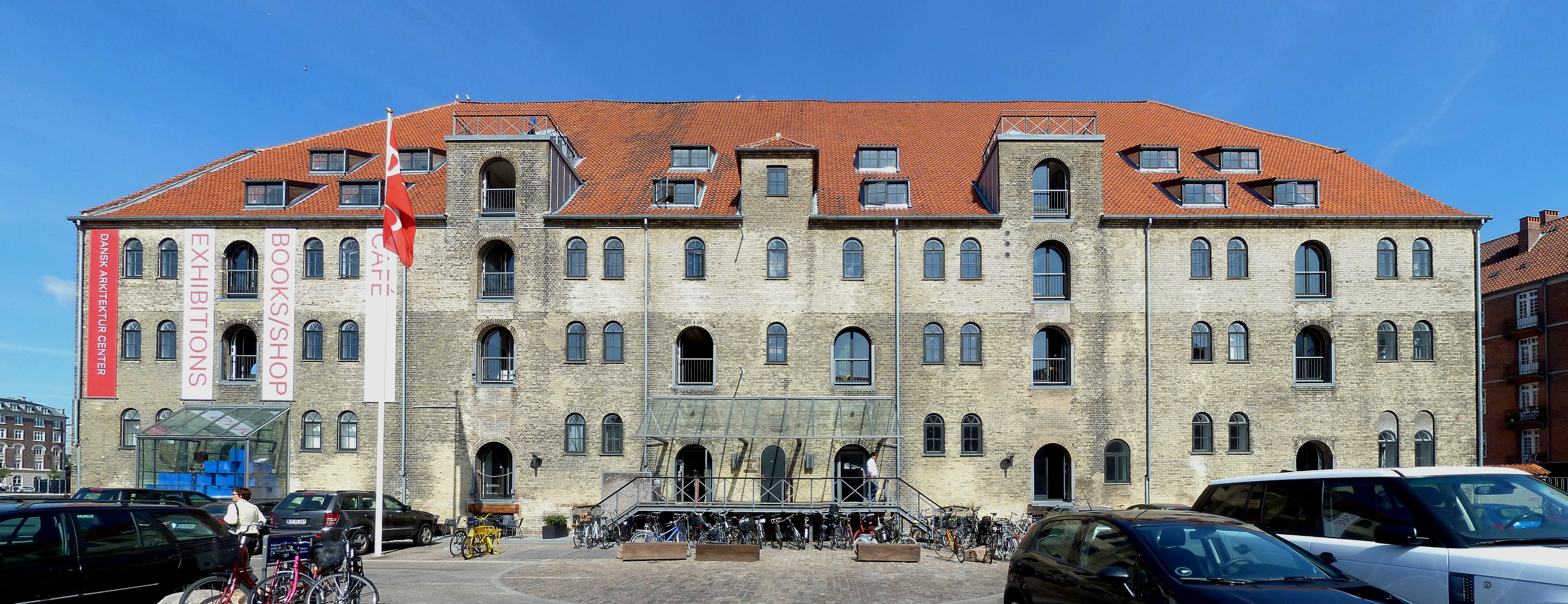
Gammel Dok seen from the south

== See also ==
- North Atlantic House
