= Johan Bernhardt Schottmann =

German-Danish master builder who worked in Copenhagen

Johan Bernhardt Schottmann (2 November 1734 – 1786) was a German-Danish master builder who worked in Copenhagen, where he was an early proponent of the Neoclassical style. The Schottmann House at Strandgade 10 in Christianshavn is named after him.

== Biography ==
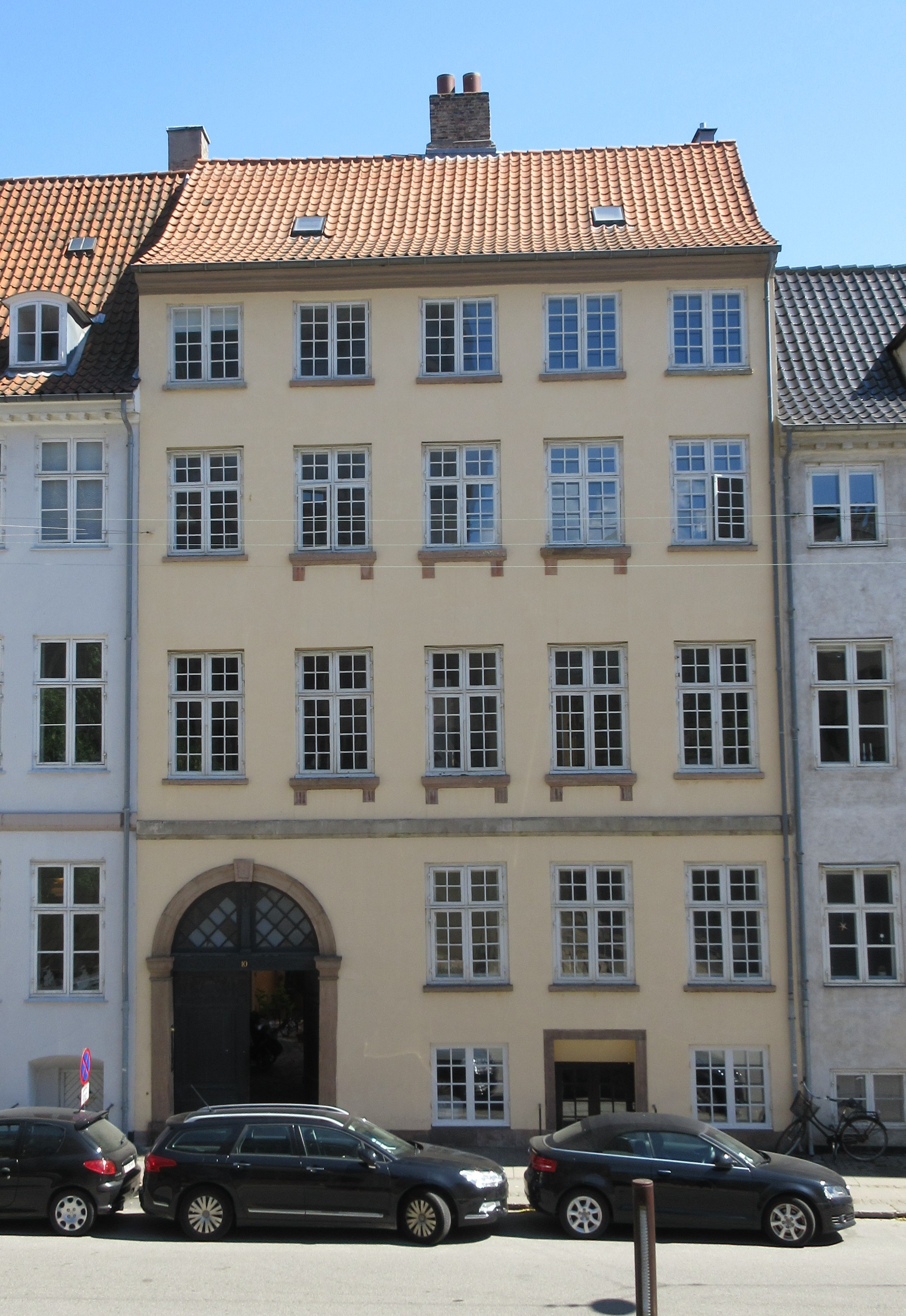
Schottmann House at Strandgade 10 in Christianshavn, Copenhagen

Schottmann was born at Gotha in Saxony in 1734. He moved to Copenhagen where he was licensed as a mason on 11 May 1763 and served as alderman of the Masons' Guild from 1778 to 1785 As a master builder, Schottmann was an early proponent of the Neoclassical style in Copenhagen. His own house at Strandgade 10 in Christianshavn, now known as the Schottmann House after him, shows influence from Nicolas-Henri Jardins simple facade designs. With projects such as Søkvæsthuset's Bådmandsstræde Wing and Danish Asiatic Company's warehouse at Strandgade 25, Schottmann adapted new buildings to the style of older architecture.

He married Anna Cathrine Biergaard (c. 1744 – 1815) in Copenhagen. He died in 1786 and was interred at St. Peter's Church, Copenhagen.

== List of works ==
Schottmann's works include:

- Badstuestræde 15, Copenhagen (1798-1802m with Hans Weile)
- Bådsmandsstræde 19, Copenhagen (1780-1781)
- Overgaden Oven Vandet 60b-c, Copenhagen (1780-1781)
- Pilestræde 46, Copenhagen (1767-1768m expansion and adaption)
- Schottmann House, Strandgade 10-10a-e, Copenhagen (1775, adaption)
- Warehouse for Danish Asiatic Company, Strandgade 25, Copenhagen (1781)
