= Kongen af Danmark =

Kongen af Danmark (lit. "King of Denmark") may refer to:

== Ships ==
- Kongen af Danmark (1735 DAC ship), DAC chinaman
- Kongen af Danmark (1745 DAC ship), DAC chinaman
- Kongen af Danmark (1765 DAC ship), DAC chinaman
- Kongen af Danmark (1769 DAC ship), DAC chinaman
- Kongen af Danmark (1788 DAC ship), DAC chinaman

== Other ==
- Kongen af Danmark (confectionery), a type of hard candy
- Hotel Kongen af Danmark, a former hotel in Copenhagen
