= Kronprinsen af Danmark (1746 DAC ship) =

1746 Danish Chinaman ship

Kronprinsen af Danmark was a Chinaman of the Danish Asiatic Company, built at Asiatisk Plads in 1746. She sailed on three expeditions to Canton between 1746 and 1753.

== Construction ==
The Kronprinsen af Danmark was built at the Danish Asiatic Company's own shipyard. Another DAC Chinaman by the same name had wrecked in January 1845.

== Career ==
The Kronprinsen af Danmark departed from Copenhagen in 1747, bound for Canton. She arrived back in Copenhagen in 1748.

She departed from Copenhagen in 1749, bound for Canton. She arrived back in Copenhagen in 1641.

She departed from Copenhagen in 1752, bound for Canton. She arrived back in Copenhagen in 1753.

== Fate ==
She was sold by auction 1754. Kongen af Danmark was sold at the same auction.
