= Dronningen af Danmark (1738 DAC ship) =

1738 Danish Chinaman ship

Dronningen af Danmark was a Chinaman of the Danish Asiatic Company, built at Asiatisk Plads in 1738. She sailed on four expeditions to Canton but was lost on her last homebound voyage in late 1746. Another ship by the same name was constructed at Asiatisk Plads in 1848.

== Career ==
The ship was built to a design by Knud Nielsen Benstrup at the Danish Asiatic Company's own shipyard. She was launched on 3 September 1738. She was the second ship built at Asiatisk Plads.

== Career ==
1739–1740

Dronningen af Danmark sailed on her first expedition to Canton in 1739–1740. The ship's log book (16 December 1739 – 2 December 1740) was kept by master (styrmand) Peder Grib.

1740–1742

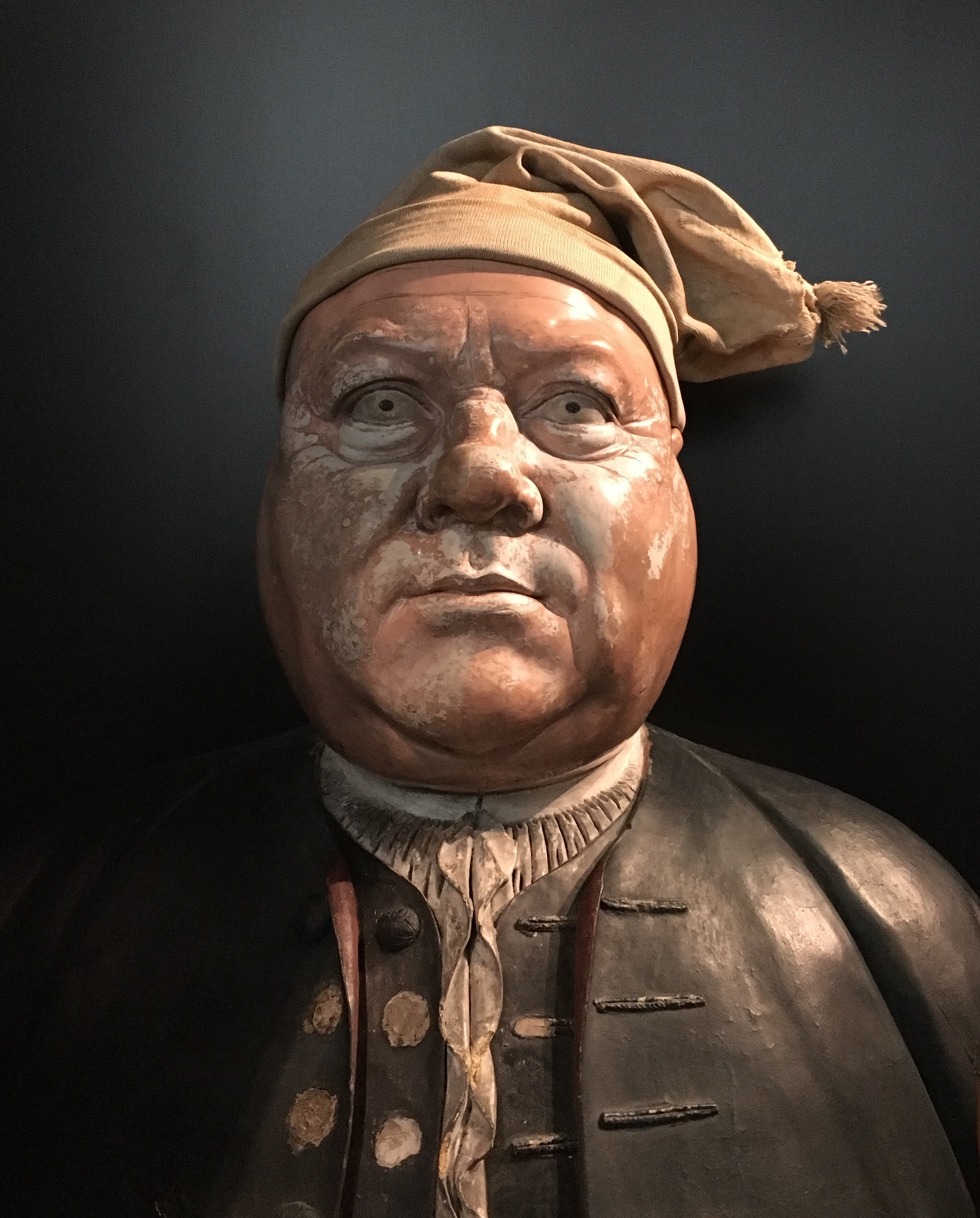
Bust of Zacharias Allewelt in the Danish Maritime Museum

Dronningen af Danmark was captained by Zacharias Allewelt on her second expedition to Canton in 1740–1742. The ship ran aground at Læsø and ended up calling at Arendal for repairs. It took the ship 250 days to leave Danish-Norwegian waters. This gave Allewelt an opportunity to spend time in his house on Merdø.

1742–1744

Dronningen af Danmark was again captained by Zacharias Allewelt on her third expedition to Canton in 1742–1744. He spent round a month at Arendal, waiting for more fabourable winds. The log book (3 December 1742 – 16 September 1744) was kept by master (styrmand) Nicolay Mundelaer om the Futch language.

1745–1746

Dronningen af Danmark was captained by Peder N. Roed on her fourth expedition. She was lost on the homebound voyage somewhere in the Atlantic Ocean in late 1746.

== Legacy ==
Jens Boje served as ship's chaplain on two of the ship's expeditions. His diary from one of the expeditions was later published as Journal paa den anden Reyse til China med Skibet Dronningen af Danmark, indeholdende de merkværdigste Ting, som fra Reysens Begyndelse Anno 1742 og til dens Ende 1744 ere arriverede, samt lidet om nogle Landes Væsen og Beskaffenhed (printed by Christoph Georg Glasing, Copenhagen, 1745).

Jens Boye would later become pastor of Tromøy Parish in Norway. He presented a model of Dronningen af Danmark to the local church for use as votive ship.
