= Kronprinsessen (DAC ship) =

Frigate of the Danish Asiatic Company

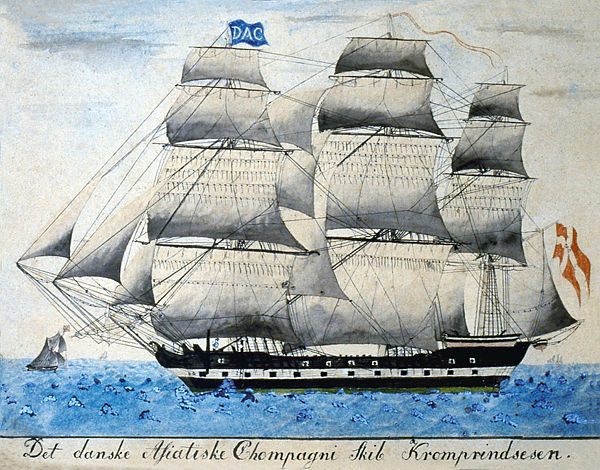
Kronprinsessen in c. 1805.

Kronprinsessen (lit. "The Crown Princess") was a frigate of the Danish Asiatic Company, bought in 1802. During the Napoleonic Wars, in 1808–10, she was loaned to the Royal Danish Navy for use as a station ship. She later sailed on two more expeditions for the Danish Asiatic Company, first to Tranquebar in 1818–20, and then, in 1822–23, to Canton. Theodor Emil Ludvigsen has described the expedition to Canton in his memoirs Erindringer om mine Søreiser og Livs Begivenheder.

== Origins ==
The ship was bought in London in 1802. She was subsequently renamed Kronprinsessen.

== Career ==
Tranquebar, 1803–05

In 1803–05, Kronprinsessen sailed on an expedition to Danish India,

Naval service, 1805–10

The Napoleonic Wars prevented the Kronprinsessen from being sent on another expedition to Tranquebar following her return in 1805. In 1808, after most of the Danish Navy's ships had been captured by the British, Kronprinsessen and Arveprinsen were loaned to the Danish Navy. Kronprinsessen was subsequently used as a station ship until 1810.

Tranquebar, 1818–20

In 1818–20, she was finally sent on another expedition to Tranquebar.

Canton, 1822–23

In 1822, Kronprinsessen was sent on an expedition to Canton. It was the company's first expedition to Canton since the Christianshavn's expedition in 1805–07. The Hong merchant Chunqua had handled the company's affairs in the years that had passed. The ship's crew brought him a portrait painting of Frederick VI as a symbol of the company's gratitude. 13 officers and company traders from the ship were invited to a dinner party in his home. They had to be smuggled in since westerners were not allowed inside the city walls. One of the guests was Theodor Emil Ludvigsen. He has described the events in his memoirs Erindringer om mine Søreiser og Livs Begivenheder. Chunqua would later also send a number of presents back with the ship, including a portrait painting of himself.

In November 1822, when Canton's suburbs were hit by a devastating fire, killing 500 people, and destroying 13,070 homes and several European-owned businesses, crew members from Kronprinsessen were immediately sent up the Pearl River to guard the silver in the crypt of the Danish factory.

The Kronprinsessen called at Saint Helena for supplies on the way back to Copenhagen. The same 13 crew members who had attended the dinner party obtained permission from the local governor to visit Napoleon's tomb. The Kronprinsessen reached Copenhagen in July 1823.

== Fate ==
In 1837, Kronprinsessen was sold at auction to H. C. Hvid and broken yp.
