= Elephant (DAC ship) =

1745 Danish East Indiaman

Elephant, also referred to as Elephanten (definite form: The Elephant) or Elefant(en) (modern spelling) was an East Indiaman of the Danish Asiatic Company, bought in 1745. She sailed on two expeditions to Tranquebar, but wrecked near the Cape of Good Hope in 1750 on her second voyage to India.

== Construction ==
One source states that Elephanten was imported from Rotterdam in 1746.. Another source states that she was bought in England for (the equivalent of) 25,909 Danish rigsdaler in 1745.

== Career ==
Elephant saluted Kronborg Vastle on 13 November 1746 to mark the beginning of her first expedition to Tranquebar. She carried a cargo with a total value of 130,131 rigsdaler, of which 120,071 rigsdaler (93 %) was silver. Elephanten arrived at Tranquebar on 4 June 1747. Master (overstyrmand) Nathaniel Aars and a number of other of other crew members transferred to the ship from Kronprinsessen af Danmark somewhere along the way. She departed from Tramquebar on 23 October 1848, bound for Copenhagen. She saluted Kronborg Castle on 6 June 1748, marking her return to Danish waters. The DAC's share of her return cargo was sold at auction for 322,366 rigsdaler.

The ship's log book (19 October 1746 – 12 June 1748) was kept by chief mate (overstyrmand) Jesper With (1714–1789).

== Fate ==
Elephant was captained by Captain Andries Evertsz Grimstra on her next expedition to Tranquebar. She departed from Copenhagen on 12 November 1749. She did not salute Kronborg Castle until 8 January 1749, to mark the beginning of her outbound journey. She arrived at Tranquebar on 14 September 1749.

Elephant departed from Tranquebar on 4 March 1750. Many of the crew members were hit by serious disease some time after her departure. The ship was later lost near the Cape of Good Hope. The Cape Archives (V.C.29) describes the incident as follows:

Elephant (1750) Danish ship commanded by Captain Andries Evertsz Grimstra. Run ashore close to Gourits River while on a homeward-bound voyage from Tranquebar, India on 8 August 1750. She was trying to reach Mossel Bay, but was wrecked on purpose in an effort to save the lives of the desperately sick crew. No lives were lost; the crew of 65 walked to Cape Town.

On 12 March 1750, Lloyd's List reported the incident as follows:

The Elephant, Capt. Grinsta, from Tranquebar for Copenhagen, who sailed thence the 22nd of January, was lost the 15th of Aug. in Mosele Bay and only 35 of the Crew were saved.

The confusion regarding the dates seem to be related to differences in the Adoption of the Gregorian calendar. The captain, officers and some of the crew (67 men in total) were saved by the Dutch ship Onwerkirk. Thirty-five men boarded the Danish ship Haabert on 16 December and returned with it to Copenhagen.

The ship's log (27 February 1750 --17 April 1751) was kept by assistant Hans Wandel.
