= Prinsesse Charlotte Amalie (1781 DAC ship) =

Chinaman of the Danish Asiatic Company

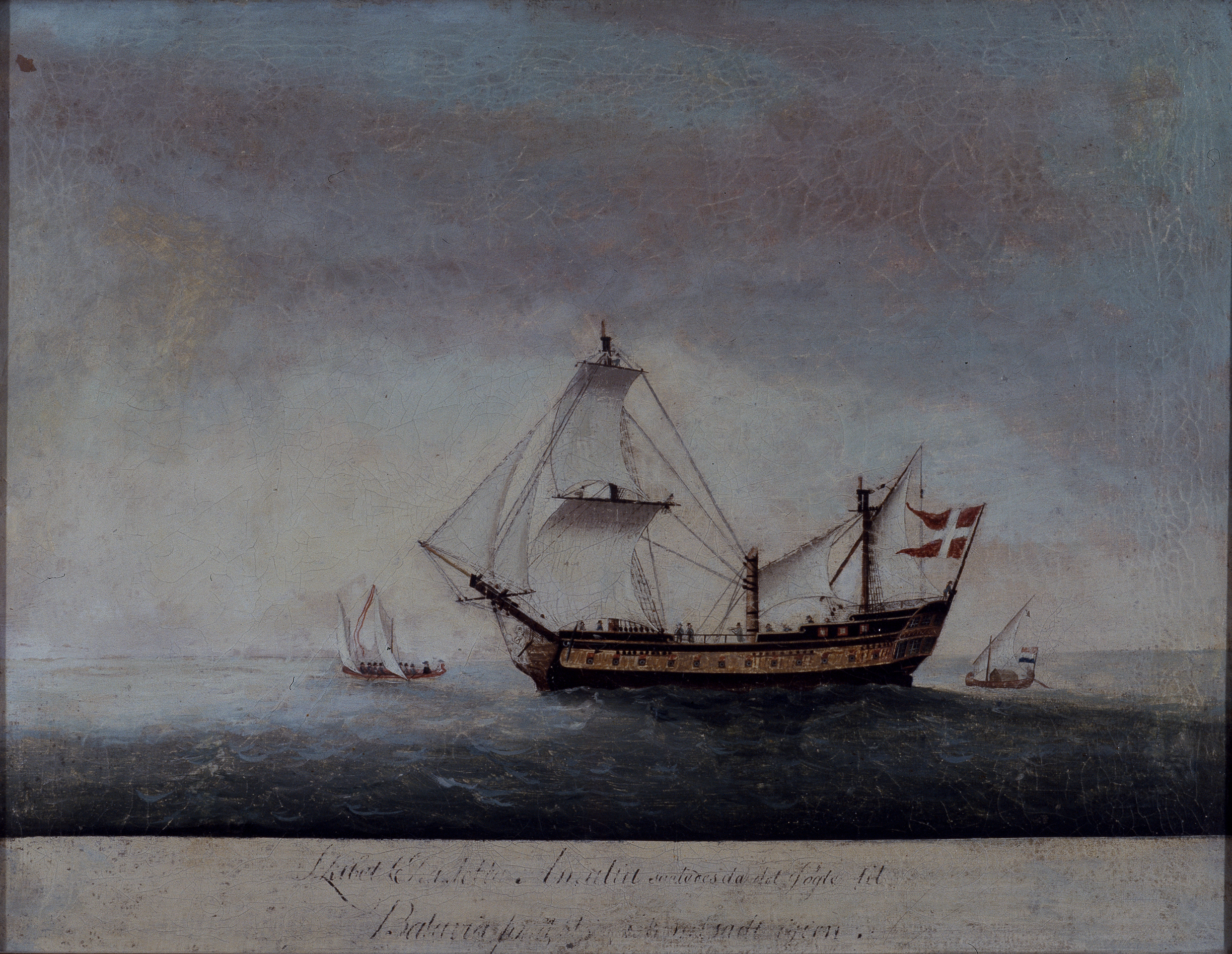

Denmark
- Name: Prinsesse Charlotte Amalie
- Owner: Danish Asiatic Company
- Builder: Asiatisk Plads
- Launched: 1781
- In service: 1735-44
- Fate: Wrecked

General characteristics
- Class & type: Frigate

Prinsesse Charlotte Amalie was a Chinaman of the Danish Asiatic Company, built in 1781. She completed four expeditions to Canton.

== Construction and design ==
Prinsesse Charlotte Amalie was constructed by master shipbuilder Christian Bruus at Asiatisk Plads. Her bilbrev was issued on 24 October 1781. She was the 22nd ship built at the company's shipyard and its second ship named after Princess Charlotte Amalie. The first one was East Indiaman Prinsesse Charlotte Amalie (nought 1738 or 1739).

Prinsesse Charlotte Amalie was 153 ft long, with a beam of 40–9 ft and a draught of 18–2 ft.

== DAC career ==
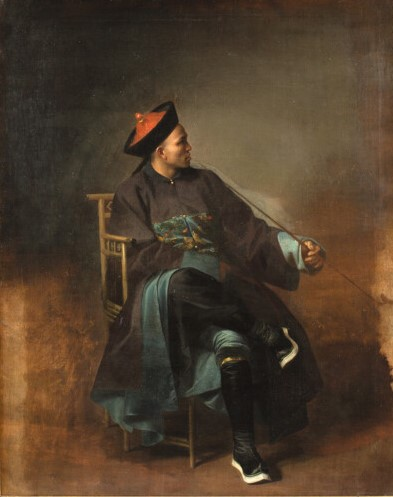
One of the 47 Chinese sailors who came to Copenhagen, painted by Jens Juel.

It is unclear who captained Prinsesse Charlotte Amalie' on her first expedition to Canton. The log book (26 October 1781 – 8 November 1783) was supposedly kept by Capt. G. G. Stage. Another source states that the ship was captained by one Capt. Petersen. She set sail from Copenhagen on 26 October 1781, bound for Canton. The ship lost 56 sailors on the way to Canton. Captain Petersen responded by hiring 47 Chinese sailors for the return voyage, which was technically forbidden. In order to support the families of the sailors, they received six months’ pay in advance.

Prinsesse Charlotte Amalie arrived back in Copenhagen on 8 November 1783. All the Chinese sailors survived the voyage. It was the first time that Chinese people were seen in the streets of Copenhagen. One or more of them sat for Jens Juel. 22 of them returned to Canton with Prinsesse Charlotte Amalie in April 1794. Another 23 returned with another ship a little later the same year. What happened to the last two is unclear.

=== 1784–87 ===
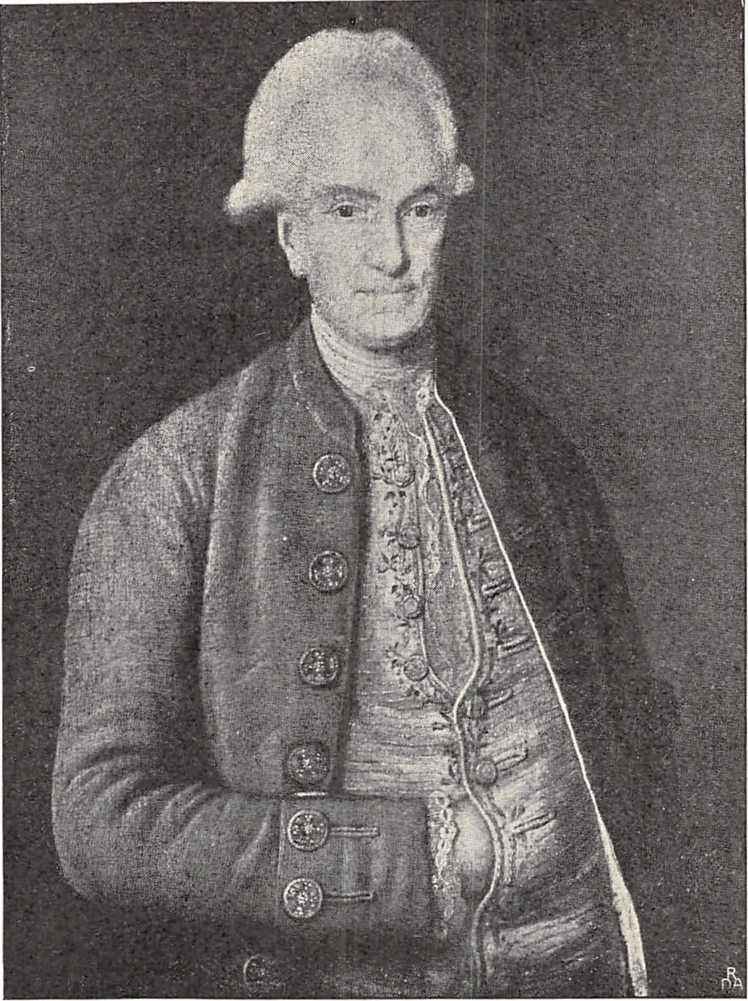
Mouritz With.

Prinsesse Charlotte Amalie was captained by Mouritz With (1746-1810) on her second expedition to Canton. With's wife Marie Caroline Fenger—a daughter of the businessman Peter Fenger—had died just 19 years old in 1780.

With sailed from Copenhagen on 22 March 1784. 22 of the Chinese sailors returned to Canton with the ship. The ship arrived back in Copenhagen on 2 May 1787. The log book (kept by With) covers the period 22 March 1784 – 2 May 1787.

M1787–89 Prinsesse Charlotte Amalie was again captain by With on her third expedition to Canton in 1787–89. The ship's prorpcpæ (16 November 1787 – 31 July 1789) was kept by master G. G. Stage.

=== 1795–98 ===
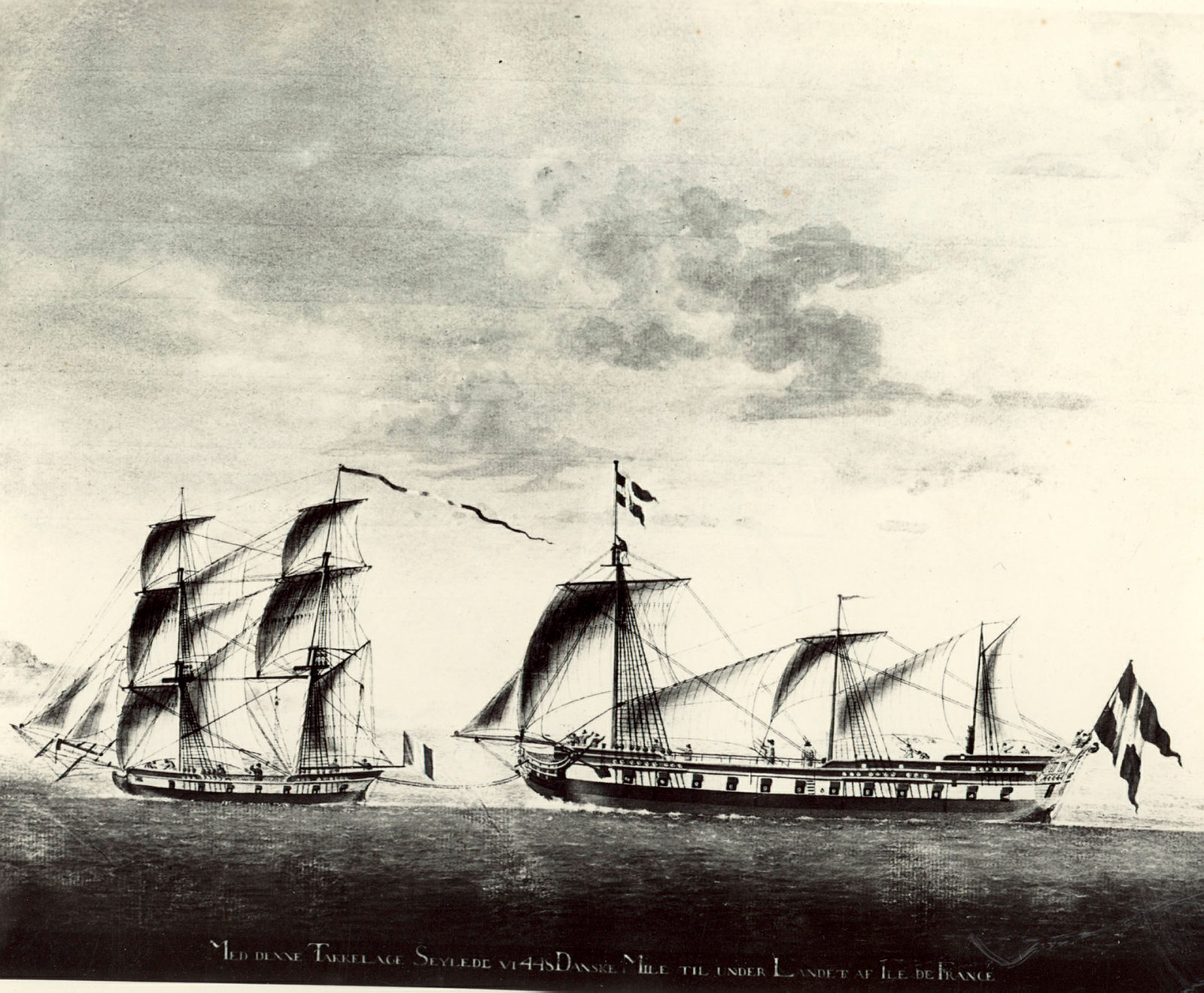
Prinsesse Charlotte Amalie with broken masts in 1797.

Prinsesse Charlotte Amalie was again captained by With on her fourth expedition to Canton. He sailed from Copenhagen in December 1795, bound for Canton. The ship was demasted on the way to Canton. On the way back to Copenhagen, she was again badly damaged in hard weather.

Eith was in 1789 married to his late wife's sister Magdalene Fenger. There were the parents of politician J.P. With (1715-1794).

== Fate ==
In 1801, Prinsesse Charlotte Amalie was sold to the navy. She was used as a blokskib at Københavns Red during the Battle of Copenhagen.

A strongbox believed to have been used by Mouritz With on the Prinsesse Charlotte Amalie is in the collection of the Danish Maritime Museum in Gelsingør.
