= HDMS Fyen (1736) =

1736 Danish ship of the line

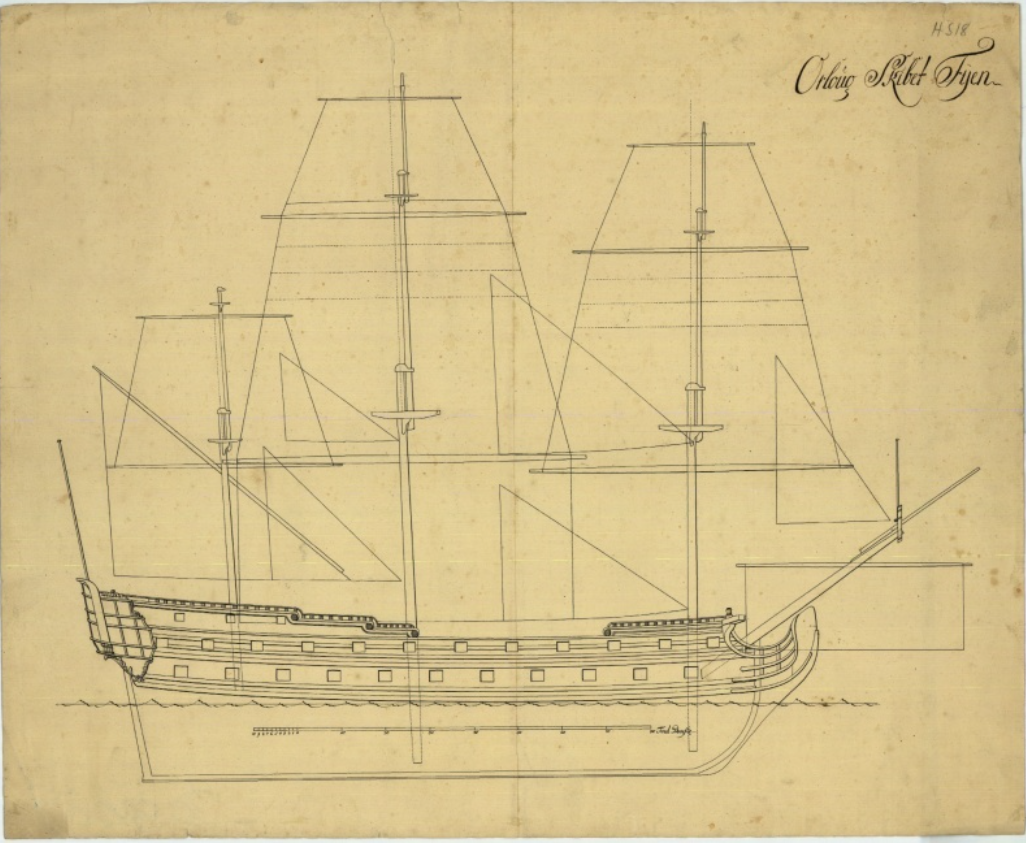
- Construction rendering from c. 1736

History
- Name: HDMS Fyen
- Operator: Danish Asiatic Company (1745)
- Launched: 1736
- Fate: broken up (1752)

General characteristics
- Type: Chinaman
- Length: 144 ft 4 in (43.99 m)
- Beam: 38 ft 6 in (11.73 m)

HDMS Fyen was a ship of the line of the Royal Dano-Norwegian Navy, built at Nyholm in 1736. In 1745, she was sold to the Danish Asiatic Company for use as a Chinaman. She sailed on three expeditions to Canton.

== Construction and design ==
Fyen was constructed at Nyholm to designs by Diderich de Thurah. She was launched on 13 September 1736.

Fyen was 144 ft 4 in (43.99 m) long with a beam of 38 ft 6 in (11.73 m) and a draught of 16 ft 2 in (4.93 m). Her complement was 385 men. Her armament was 50 18-pounder guns.

== Career ==
=== Naval career ===
The ship proved to be a poor sailer and was therefore unsuitable for use as a warship. In 1745, she was sold to the Danish Asiatic Company.

=== DAC service ===
1745-1747

She sailed on her first expedition to Canton in 1745–1747. The ship's log book (20 November 1745 – 20 July 1747) was kept by master (styrmand) Cornelius Bagge.

Johan Ludwig Abbestée served as 1st supercargo on the expedition. A boy of this name is mentioned in the Reformed Church's confirmation protocol from 1770, with the note "father in Tranquebar", indicating that he was the son of Hermann Abbestée in an otherwise undocumented, earlier marriage.

1747-1749

She sailed on her second expedition to Canton in 1747–1749. The ship's protocol (4 December 1747 – 2 June 1840) was kept by master Paul Kock.

1749-1751

She sailed on her third expedition to Canton in 1749–1751. The ship's protocol (17 September 1749 – 30 July 1751) was kept by master Johan Clausen Boedt.

== Fate and legacy ==
Back in Copenhagen in 1751, she was deemed in too poor a condition for further voyages. In February 1752, she was sold at auction and broken up.

A 1:18 scale model of the ship dating from its time of construction is in the collection of the Royal Danish Naval Museum. In 1762, ot was transgerred to Christiansborg Palace. During the Fire of Christiansborg Palace in 1794, its rigging was damaged. It was later repaired. It is considered one of the finest models in the collection.
