= Fredensborg Slot (DAC ship) =

Chinaman of the Danish Asiatic Company

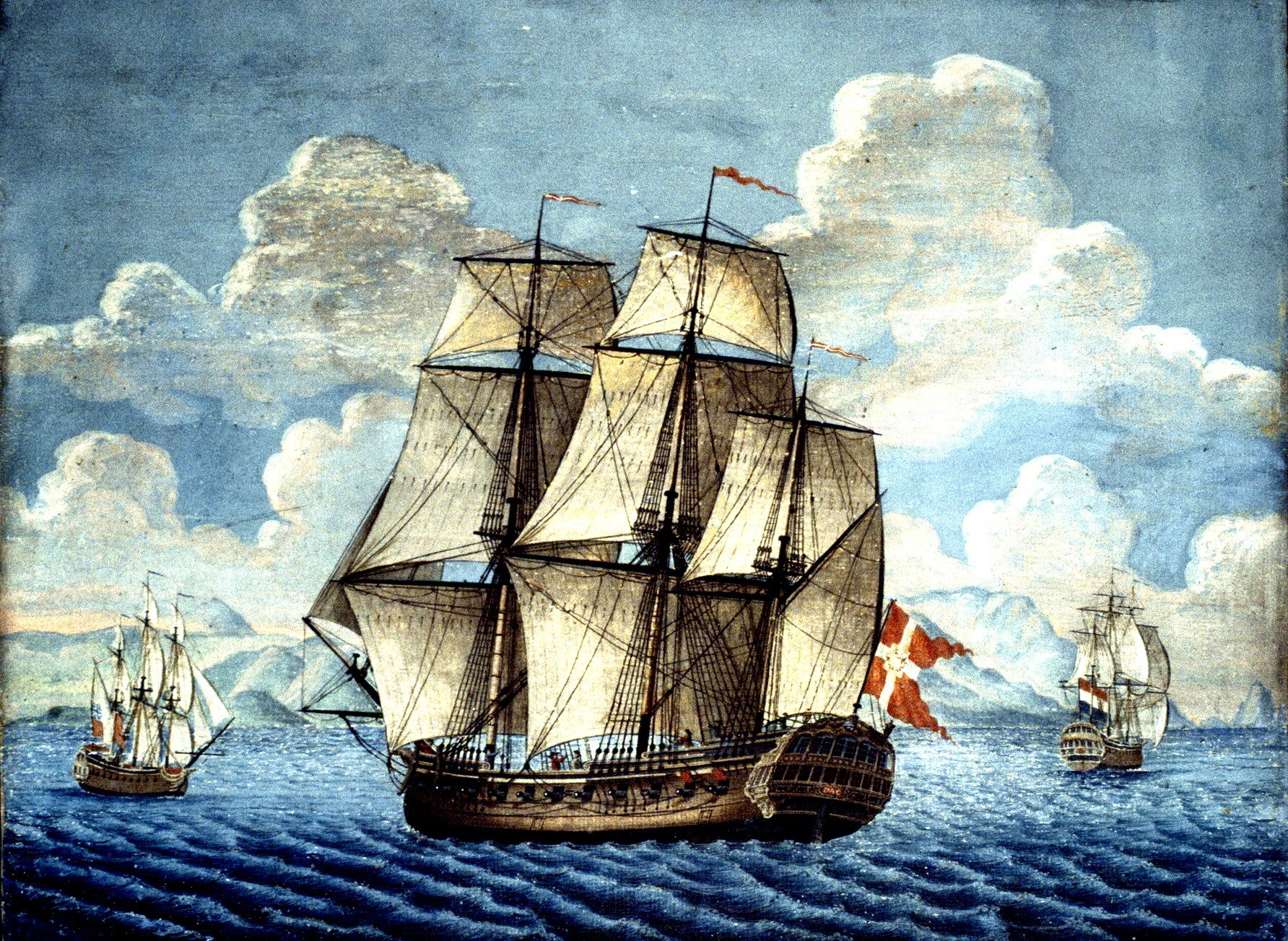
Fredensborg Slot in c. 1765.

Fredensborg Slot (also Fredensborg Slott or simply Fredensborg) was a Chinaman of the Danish Asiatic Company (DAC). She completed six expeditions to Canton between 1765 and 1778.

== Construction and design ==
Fredensborg Slot was constructed at Asiatisk Plads. She was the 13th ship constructed at the DAC's own shipyard. She was designed by Frederik Michael Krabbe and the master shipbuilder Poul Frantzen (Frandsen) was responsible for overseeing the actual construction. Her bilbrev was issued on 10 or 14 October 1765.

She was 145 ft (44 m) long with a beam of 38 ft (12 m) and a draught of 17 ft (5.2 m).

== DAC service ==
Fredensborg Slot completed six DAC expeditions to Canton in 1765-67, 1767-69, 1769-71, 1771-72, 1775-76 and 1777-78.

Her captains included Lars Swane (1768-1769), Peder Holm (1771-73), Niels Olsen Hielte (1774-76) and . Henrich Matthias Foss (1777-78).
