= Danish Asiatic Company =

Danish trading company

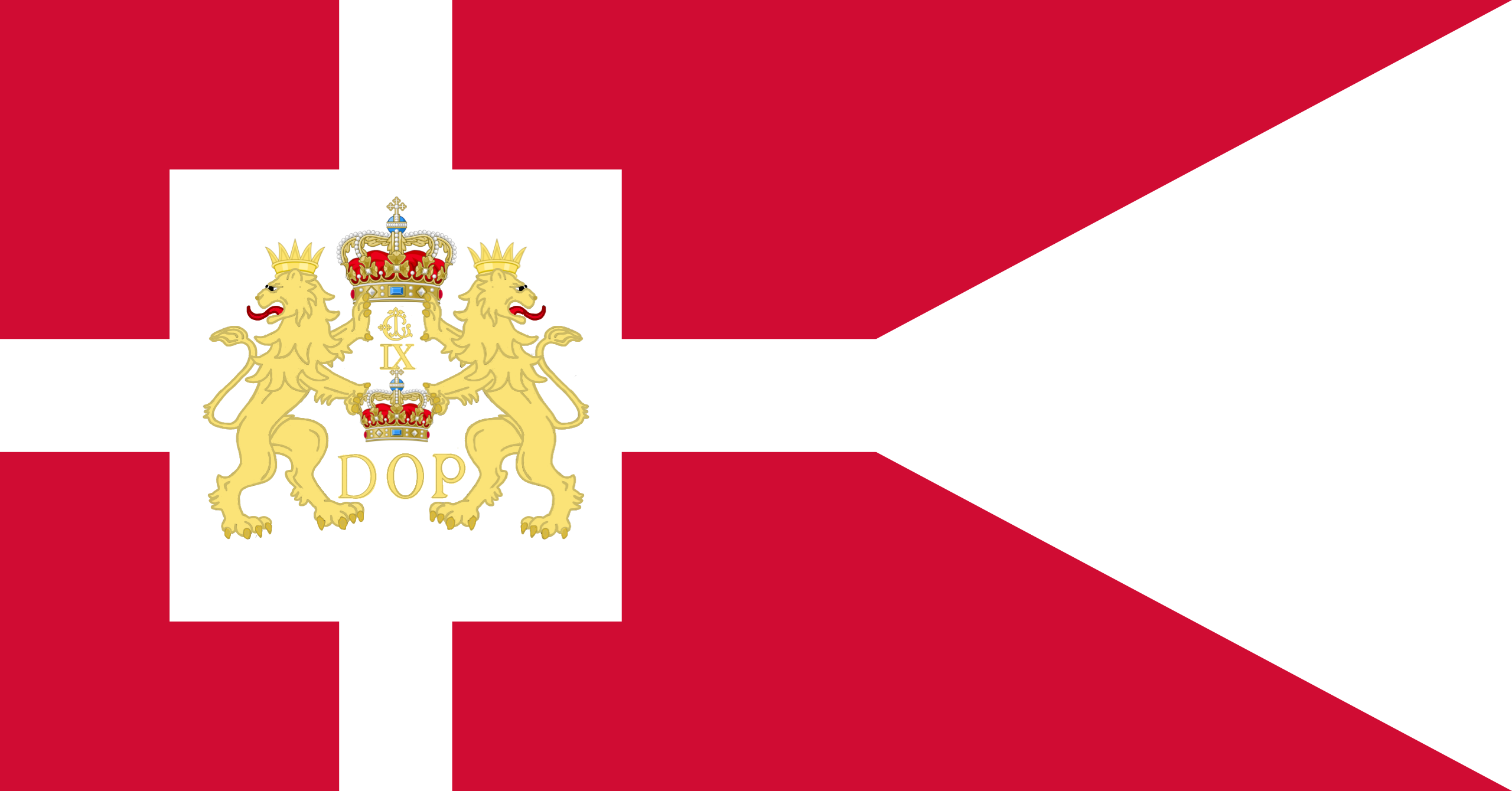
Danish Colonial Merchant ensign of India

Danish Asiatic Company (Danish: Asiatisk Kompagni) was a Danish trading company established in 1730 to revive Danish-Norwegian trade in the Danish East Indies and China following the closure of the Danish East India Company. It was granted a 40-year monopoly on Danish trade in Asia in 1732 and taken over by the Danish government in 1772. It was headquartered at Asiatisk Plads in Copenhagen. Its former premises are now used by the Ministry of Foreign Affairs.

== History ==
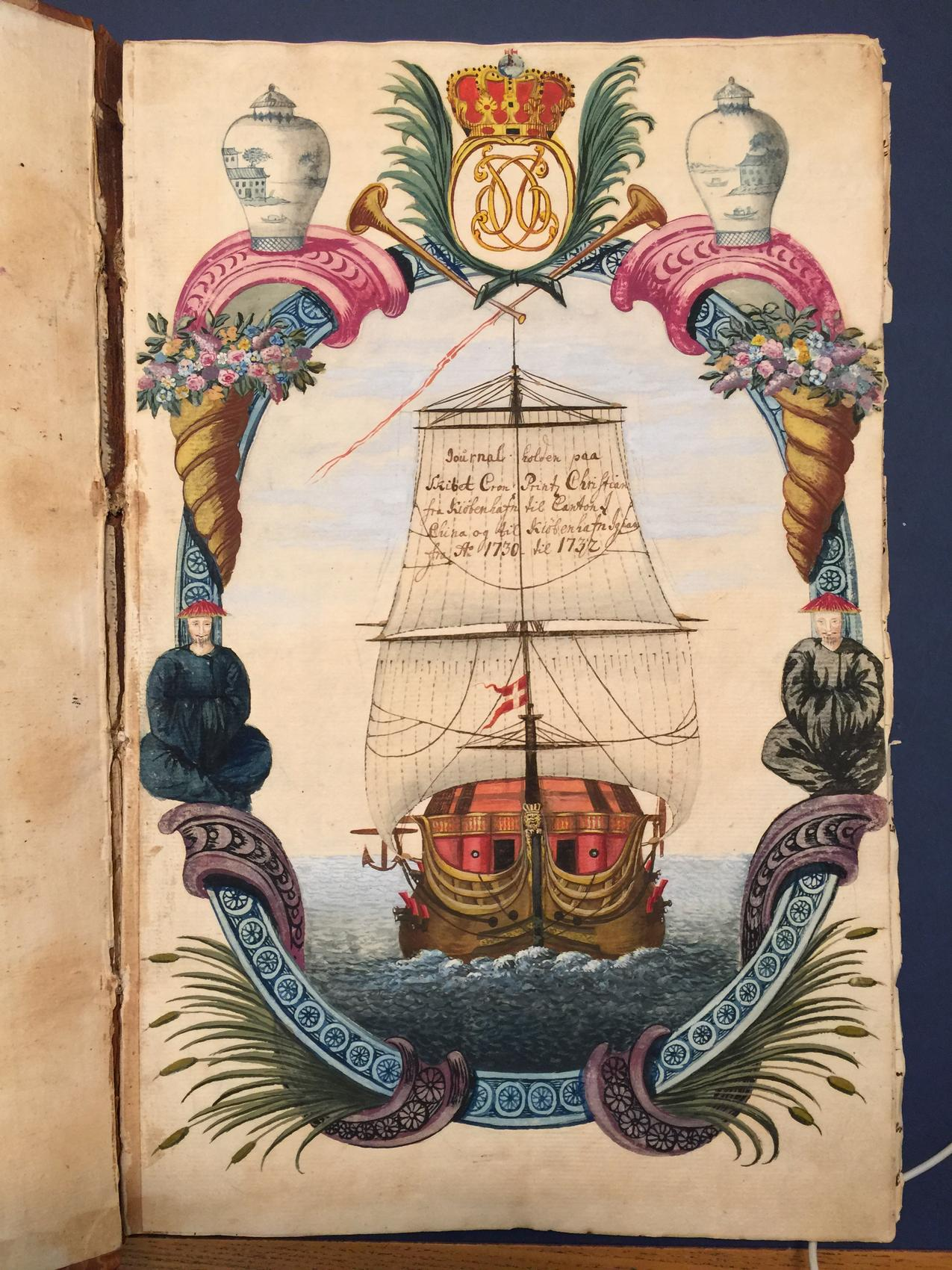
Cronprintz Christian seen on the front page from the ship journal from its 1730-31 voyage to China

The Danish East India Company was dissolved in 1729. Some of Copenhagen's leading merchants responded to its dissolution by creating two trading societies, one for the Indian trade and another one for the new and promising China trade. On 20 April 1730, the two societies were merged to form the Danish Asiatic Company. The reformed interim company opened trade with Qing China at Canton. The first expedition went badly, with Den gyldne Løve lost with its cargo of silver off Ballyheigue, Ireland, on the outbound journey. Local landowners held the silver at their estate and pursued a salvage claim, but a gang of locals overpowered the Danish guard and made off with the hoard, causing a diplomatic row between Denmark-Norway and Great Britain. The Cron Printz Christian returned from the company's first successful expedition to Canton in 1732.

With the royal licence conferred in 1732, the new company was granted a 40-year monopoly on all Danish trade east of the Cape of Good Hope. Before 1750, it sent 27 ships; 22 survived the journey to return to Copenhagen. In 1772, the company lost its monopoly and in 1779, Danish India became a crown colony.

During the Napoleonic Wars, in 1801 and again in 1807, the Royal Navy attacked Copenhagen. As a consequence of the last attack (in which most of the Danish navy was captured), Denmark (one of few Western European countries not occupied by Napoleon), ceded the island of Heligoland (part of the Duchy of Holstein-Gottorp) to Britain. In the east, when news of Anglo-Danish hostilities reached India, British colonial authorities immediately impounded seven Danish merchantmen in the Hoogli on 28 January 1808. Denmark sold its remaining colonies in mainland India to Britain in 1845, and the Danish Gold Coast to the British in 1850.

== Management ==
=== Presidents ===
- (1732–1743) Christian Ludvig von Plessen
- (1743–1759) Johan Sigismund Schulin
- (1759–1772) Adam Gottlob Moltke

=== Board of directors ===
Members of the board of directors included:

- 1730–1743: Frederik Holmsted
- 1732–1739: Gregorius Klauman
- 1732–1743: Hans Jørgen Soelberg
- 1738-1843: Hans Nielsen Gram
- 1740–1744: Michael Fabritius
- 1753–1755: Anthoni Raft
- 1739–1752: Olfert Fas Fischer
- 1744-1746: Herman Henrik Kønneman
- 1744–1752: Joost van Hemert
- 1745–1754: Peter van Hurk
- 1747–1750: Herman Lengerken Kløcker
- 1753–1759: Johan Friederich Wewer
- 1753–1767: Oluf Blach
- 1754-1758: Jens Werner Ackeleye
- 1758-: Johan Johan Frederik
- 1755–1766: Just Fabritius
- 1760–1768: Reinhard Iselin
- 1763–1770: Abraham Falck
- 1769–1772: Gysbert Behagen
- 1771–1775: John Brown
- 1661-: Jørgen Erik Skeel
- 1772–1775: Niels Ryberg, 1st term
- 1772–1776: Conrad Fabritius de Tengnagel, 1st term
- 1773–1775: William Halling
- 1773–1775: Peder Hoppe
- 1773-75: George Elphinston
- 1773–1776: Frédéric de Coninck
- * 1776-1779: Laurentius Johannes Cramer, 1st term
- 1776–1779: Christen Schaarup Black
- 1776-1785: Simon Hooglant
- 1776-1779: Hans Georg Krog
- Jens Krag-Juel-Vind
- 1777: Hermann Abbestée
- 1777–1783: Peter van Hemert
- 1666-1783 Otto Christian Haaber
- 1777-1783: Otto Christian Haaber
- 1780-1784: Niels Ryberg, 2md term
- 1784-1785: Conrad Fabritius de Tengnagel, 2nd term
- 1784-1788: Mathias Lunding
- 1784-1790: Johann Ludvig Zinn
- 1779–1785: John Brown
- 1783–1793: Erich Erichsen
- 1789-1812: Poul Skibsted
- 1784-1796: Laurentius Johannes Cramer, 2nd term
- 1791–1805: Johan Leonhard Fix
- 1792–1811: Carsten Anker, 1st director
- 1794-95: Otto Thott
- 1796-1796: Christian Wilhelm Dunzfelt
- 1799-1807: Frantz Wilhelm Otto Vogelsang
- 1805-1815: Rasmus Sternberg Selmer
- 1812–1819: Christian Klingberg
- 1816–1823: Conrad Hauser
- 1816-1822: Generalkonsul Tutein
- 1819–1843: Friederich Christian Schäffer
- 1823–1836: René Pierre Francois Mourier
- 1833-1847: Hermann Christian Müffelmann
- 1837–1843: William Frederik Duntzfelt
- 1837-1847: Peter Johan Alexei Conradt-Eberlin
- 1837-1847: Vilhelm FrederikDuntzfelt

- Years unknown: Friderich Christian Schäffer

== Fleet ==
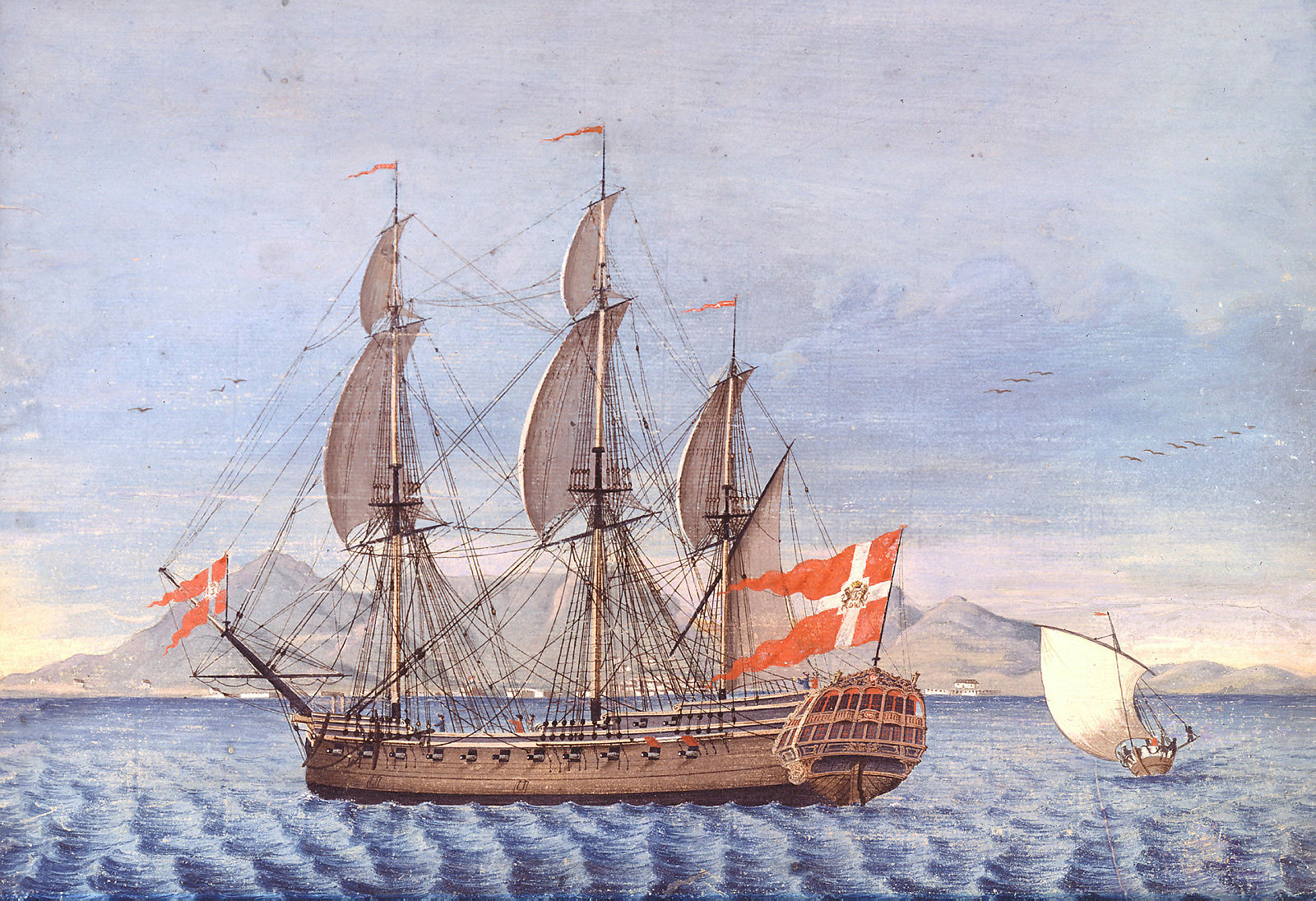
1770 painting of Dronning Sophia Magdalena, a DAC Chinaman

Details of some of these armed trading ships, often built by the Royal Danish dockyards as "handelskib, chinafarer", can be found at the Royal Danish Naval Museum website Two have a history record at Skibregister.

- Cron Printz Christian (acquired from the DEIC in 1732)
- Slesvig (acquired from the navy in 1732)
- Grev Laurvig (acquired from the DEIC in 1732)
- Vendela (acquired from the DEIC in 1732)
- Fridericus Quartus (acquired from the DEIC in 1732)
- Kongen af Danmark (built 1735)
- Dronningen af Danmark (built 1738)
- Prinsesse Louise (acquired 1738)
- Prinsesse Charlotte Amalie (acquired 1738)
- Kronprinsen af Danmark (built 1740, later renamed Cronprintz)
- Christiansborg Slot (built 1742)
- Sydermanland (acquired 1743)
- Prinsesse Louise (acruied 1744, aka Lowisa)
- Trankebar (bought 1744)
- Dokken (bought 1742)
- Fyen (acquired 1745, former ship-of-the-line)
- Kronprinsessen af Danmark (built 1745)
- Kongen af Danmark (built 1745)
- Elephanten (acquired 1746, from Rotterdam)
- Kronprinsen af Danmark (built 1746)
- Dronningen af Danmark (built 1747) – renamed Dronning Sophie Magdalene i 1752
- Prinsesse Wilhelmine Caroline (built 1750)
- Dronning Juliana Maria (built 1752)
- Kongen af Danmark (built 1755)
- Dronning Sophia Magdalena (built 1761–62)
- Fredensborg Slot (built 1764–65)
- Rigernes Ønske (built 1766)
- Kongen af Danmark (built 1768–69)
- Dronning Caroline Mathilde (built 1769)
- Bombardergalliot "Den Gloende" (built 1771)
- Prins Frederik (built 1772)
- Trankebar (built 1773)
- Castellet Dansborg (built 1774)
- Dronning Juliana Maria (built 1775)
- Kronprinsen af Danmark (built 1778)
- Prinsesse Sophia Frederica (built 1779)
- Dronning Juliana Maria (built 1780)
- Prinsesse Charlotte Amalie (built 1781)
- Nicobar (built 1782)
- Danmark (bygget 1782–83)
- Prinsesse Lowisa Magdalena (built about 1782)
- Nicobar (build year unknown) (NB two ships called Nicobar. Are they the same?)
- Mars (built 1784)
- Prinsesse Louise Augusta (bought in 1784 from Petersværft)
- Dannebrog (rebuilt 1786)
- Dronning Juliana Maria (acquired 1790)
- Kongen af Danmark (built 1788)
- Arveprinsen af Augustenborg (built 1789)
- Norge (rebuilt 1797–98)
- Christianshavn (acquired 1800)
- Holsteen (acquired 1800)
- Kronprinsen af Danmark (acquired 1801)
- Kronprinsessen (acquired 1802)
- Arveprinsen af Augustenborg (major repairs 1805)
- Kanonchalup (built 1808)

== Citations ==
- Knud Klem: Skibsbyggeriet i Danmark og Hertugdømmerne i 1700-årene; Bind I, København 1985; ISBN 87-88646-14-9
- Knud Klem: "Den danske Ostindie- og Kinahandel" (Handels- og Søfartsmuseets Årbog 1943; s. 72-102)
- Royal Danish Naval Museum website for Database > Avancerede > Set Skibstype to "Handelsskib" and Datering to appropriate dates> Søg (This works only if the language is set to Danish)
- Royal Danish Naval Museum - List of Danish Warships
- Royal Danish Naval Museum - Skibregister for individual ships record cards where they exist.
