= Laurentius Johannes Cramer =

Danish businessman

Laurentius Johannes Cramer (1748 – 5 January 1796) was a Danish businessman and Kurantbanken bank commissioner. He served as director of the Danish Asiatic Company twice, first in 1773–1776 and then in 1791–1796. In 1786–1796, he was the patron of Frederick's German Church in Christianshavn, Copenhagen.

== Early life ==
Cramer was born in 1748 as the son of a pastor in Slesvig.

== Career ==
On 15 January 1769, Cramer became a partner in Niels Ryberg's trading firm. On 31 October 1775, he left the firm. In the same year, he took citizenship as a wholesaler (grosserer) and established his own trading firm. It traded as Cramer & Sønner (Cramer & Sons) after he had been joined by his two sons.

In 1776–1779, Cramer served as one of the directors of the Danish Asiatic Company. In 1784, he was again elected as one of the directors of the company. He remained in this office until his death. In 1793–96, he was a board member of Kjøbenhavns Brandforsikring.

== Personal life and legacy ==
Cramer was married to Henrikke Margrethe Decker. She was the daughter of a pastor in Holstein. They lived at Ved Stranden in 1787. On 14 July 1794, Cramer became a member of the Royal Copenhagen Shooting Society. His membership target features a ship as well as a bridge with statues of Neptunus and Mercury. From, 1786 until his death, Cramer served as patron of Frederick's German Church in Christianshavn.

Cramer died on 5 January 1796. He is buried in the crypt of Frederick's German Church. His widow died just a few months later. They were survived by five children.

The trading firm was continued by the sons Laurentius Nicolas Cramer and Peter Wilhelm Cramer. It was hit hard by the trade crisis in 1799. In 1802, it was in serious financial trouble, but was saved with help from Ernst Schimmelmann. The daughter Elisabeth Hendrine Cramer (1779-1836) married the landowner Johan Andreas Bruun de Neergaard. Another daughter, Jeanette Dorothea Cramer, was married to silk and textile merchant Peter Thomsen (1770—1844). She died in labour with their first child on 22 February 1794. Their child, Johanne Margrethe Thomsen, who would later marry eheimelegationsraad J. H. Sick in 1812.
