= Prinsesse Charlotte Amalie (1738 DAC ship) =

1738 Danish East Indiaman ship

Prinsesse Charlotte Amalie (also spelled Charlotte Amalia) was an East Indiaman of the Danish Asiatic Company, bought in England in 1738. She sailed on three expeditions to Tranquebar between 1741 and 1745.

== Origins ==
One source states that the ship was bought in England in 1838. She sank off the Maldives in 1844. The crew was saved but 48 would later die from disease. Another source states that she was bought in England for 11,741 rigsdaler in 1839. . She was subsequently renamed for Christian VI's daughter Charlotte Amalie

== Career ==
1739–1741

Prinsesse Charlotte Amalie departed from Copenhagen on 12 November 1739, bound for Tranquebar. She carried a cargo with a total value of 130,000 rigsdaler of which 123,366 rigsdaler (95%) was silver. She arrived at Tranquebar on 30 April 1740. She departed from Tranquebar on 16 October 1740, bound for Copenhagen. She saluted Kronborg Castle on 28 January 1741, marking her safe return to Danish waters.The DAC's share of her cargo was sold at auction for 195.827 rigsdaler.

1741–1743

Prinsesse Charlotte Amalie departed from Copenhagen on 4 December 1841, bound for Tranquebar. She carried a cargo with a total value of 110,000 rigsdaler of which 101,023 rigsdaler (92%) was silver. She arrived at Tranquebar on 30 June 1742. She departed from Tranquebar on 2 February 1783, bound for Copenhagen. She saluted Kronborg Castle on 17 August 1843, marking her safe return to Danish waters.The DAC's share of her cargo was sold at auction for 236.979 rigsdaler.

1744–1745

Prinsesse Charlotte Amalie sailed on her third expedition to Tranquebar in 1744–45. The DAC's share of her cargo was sold at auction for 226,279 rigsdaler.
