= Anthoni Raff =

Danish official, businessman, and mayor of Copenhagen (1792–1758)

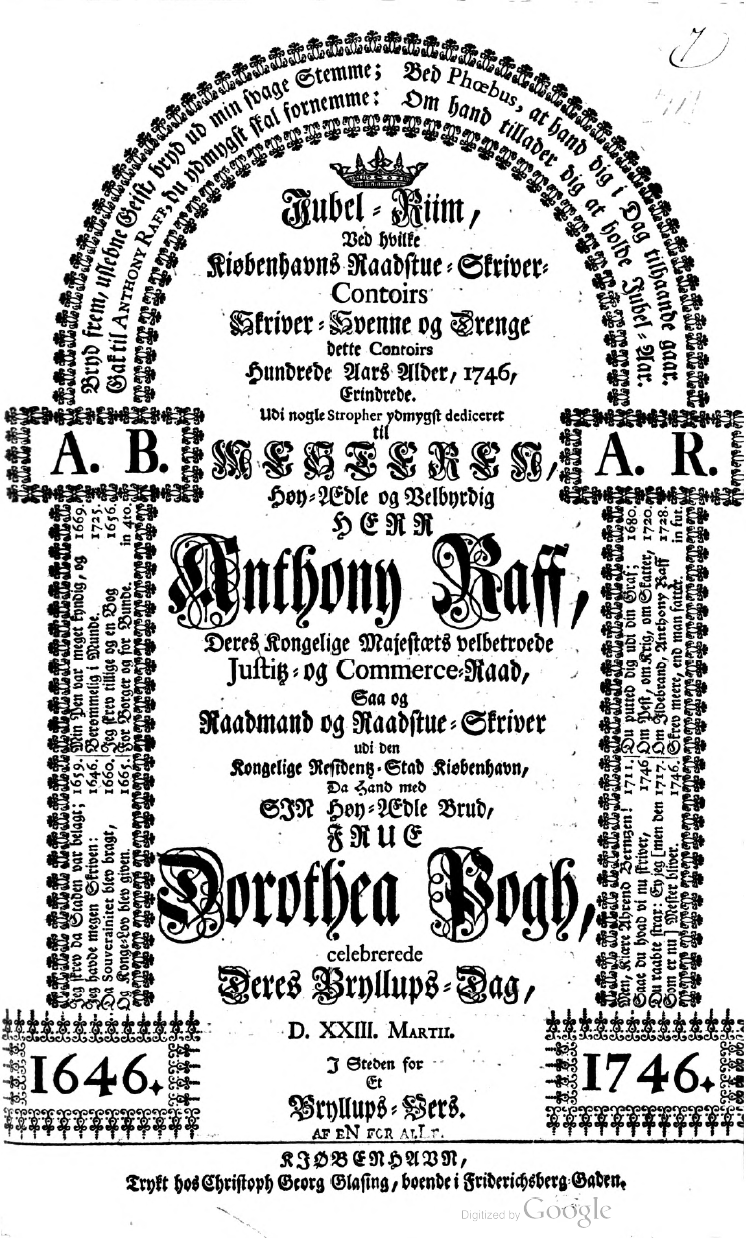
Wedding poem from Anthoni and Dorothea Raft's wedding in 1718.

Anthoni Raff (18 July 1692 – 5 February 1758) was a Danish official, mayor of Copenhagen and director of the Danish Asiatic Company.

== Early life ==
Raff was born on 18 July 1692 in Kolding, the son of Matthias Anthoni Raff and Margrethe Jensdatter Kofoed. In an early age, he became secretary for Overhofmarskal Kallenberg. In 1717, he was appointed as scribe (Raadstue-skriver) at Copenhagen City Hall. During the Copenhagen Fire of 1728, he managed to save part of the municipal archives from the burning City Hall.

In 1729, he was elected as counsilman in Copenhagen. In 1748, he became (vice-)mayor. He was awarded the title of Kommerceraad in 1731, Justitsraad in 1740 and Etatsraad in 1750.

== Personal life ==
In 1718, Raft was married to Anne Augusta Kreyer (née Mechlenburg), daughter of Kammerraad Ægidius Mechlenburg. She gave birth to five children. Their daughter Margrete was married to Hofretten judge Nikolaj Burmjester.

After the death of his first wife, he was married to Dorothea Købke, (née Pog). He died on 5 February 1758.

In 1747–1750, he was one of the largest stakeholders in the Danish Asiatic Company. In 1751–1753, he served as one of the directors of the company.
