= Norge (DAC ship) =

Danish East Indiaman ship

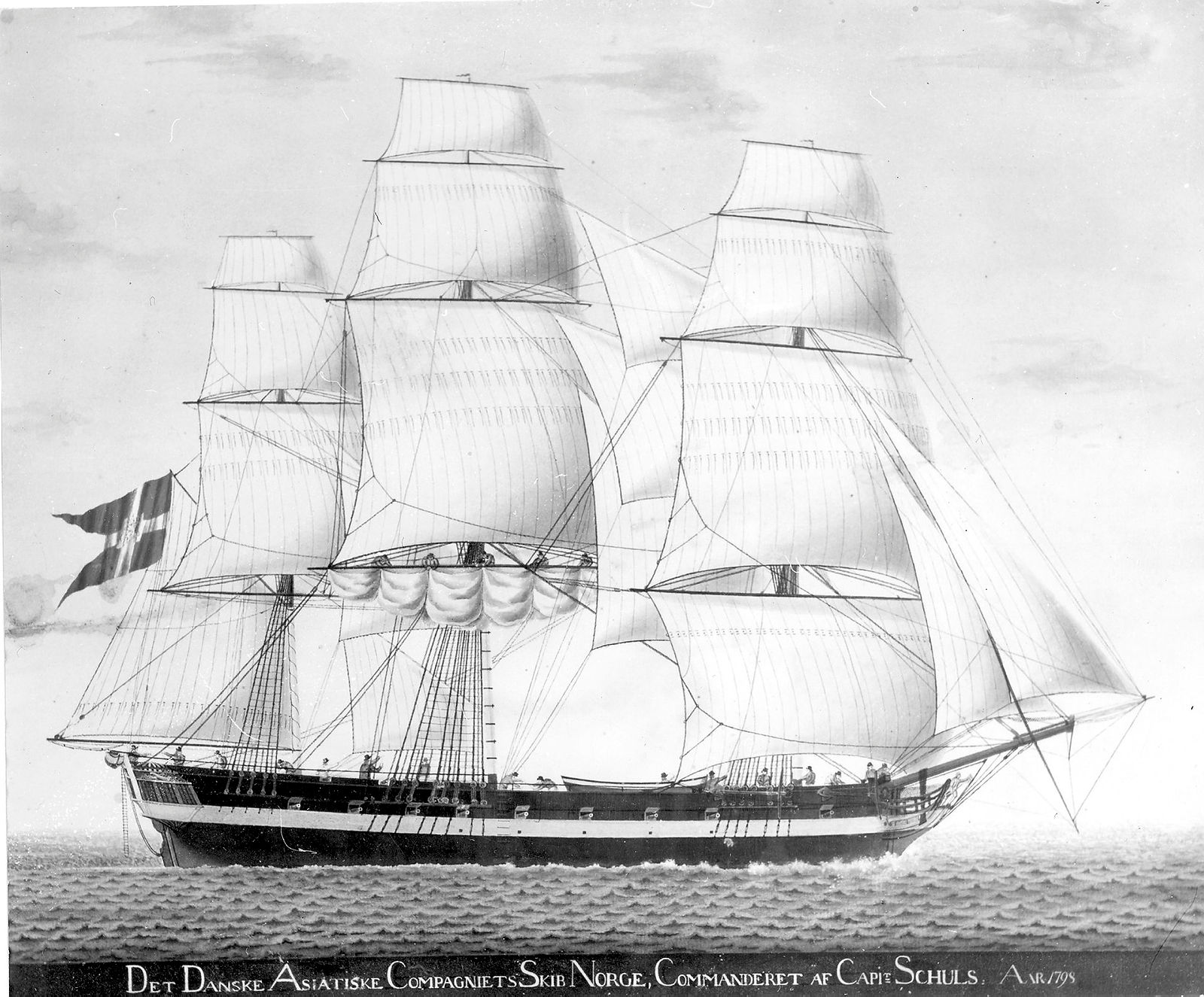
Norge in 1798.

Norge was an East Indiaman of the Danish Asiatic Company. She was taken as a prize by HMS Sceptre at the Cape of Good Hope in January 1808.

== Origins ==
The ship was a Dutch frigate taken as a prize by British forces. The name was subsequently changed to Tranquebar. In 1797, she was sold to the Danish Asiatic Company. In 1798, she was adapted at Asiatisk Plads and the name was subsequently changed to Norge. Her bilbrev was issued on 19 March 1798.

== DAC career ==
=== 1798–1799 ===
Norge was captained by Carl Schultz on her first DAC expedition to Tranquebar. The ship's log book (10 May 1798 – 8 October 1798) was kept by master (styrmand) Conrad Christian Grundtvig. Schultz set sails from Copenhagen on 24 May 1798, bound for Tranquebar. Norge reached Tranquebar on 4 February 1799. She arrived back in Copenhagen on 6 October 1799.

Carl Schultz was the nephew of counter admiral Andreas Georg Hermann Schultz. It was his last expedition as captain for the Danish Asiatic Company. In 1806, he unsuccessfully applied for the position as chief of Frederiknagore.

=== 1800–1802 ===
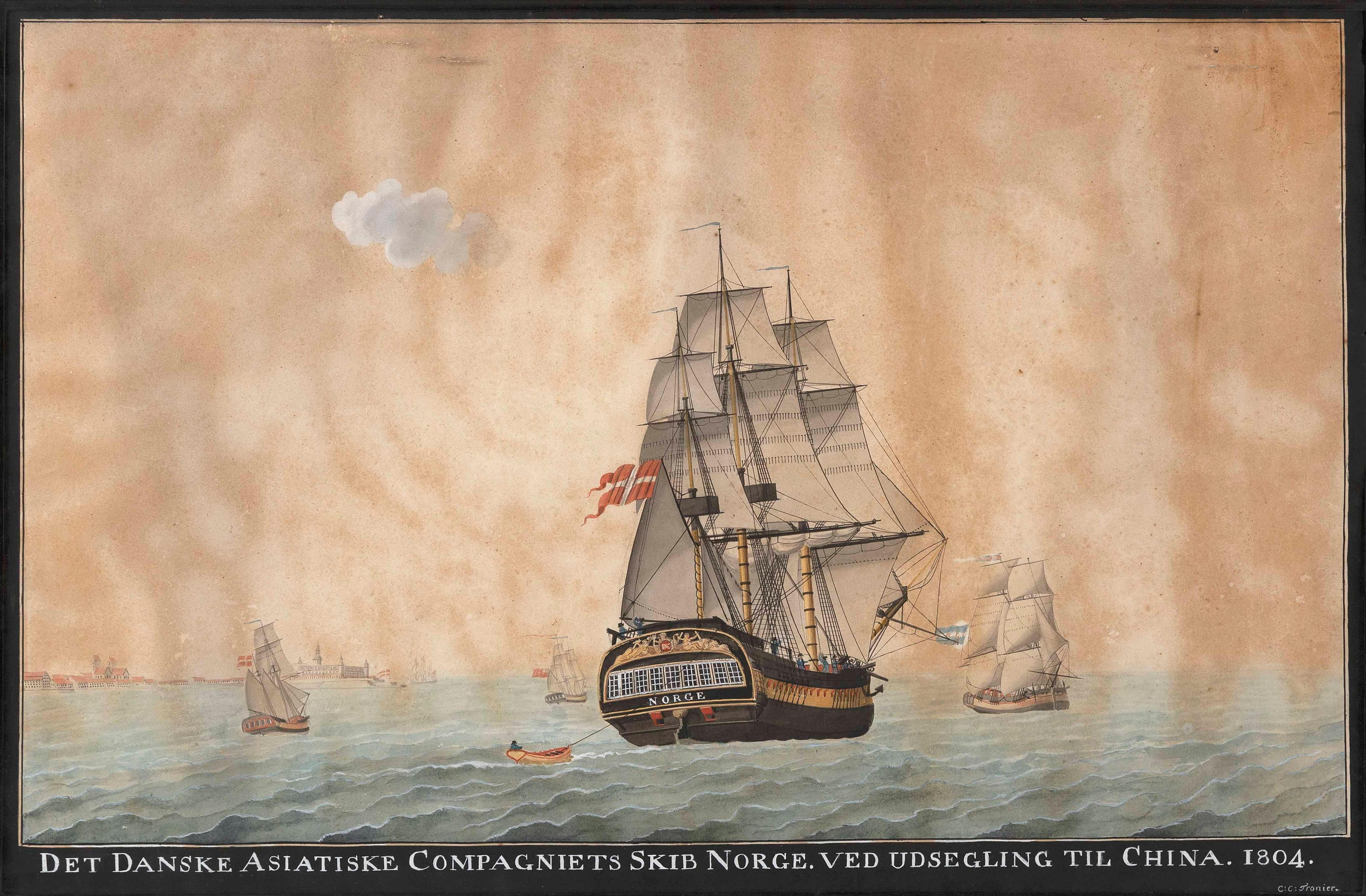
Carl Christian Tronier: The Danish Asiatic Company's ship Norge, bound for China (1804)..

She was captained by Nicolay Brinck on her next expedition to Tranquebar. The log book covers the period 30 May 1800 – 19 October 1802. The ship had a complement of 91 men. J. A. Ponsing served as master (styrmand) on the expedition.

=== 1804–1806 ===
She was captained by H. G. Trock on an expedition to Tranquebar. The log book covers the period 23 April 1804 – 5 March 1806.

== Fate ==
Norge embarked on another expedition in 1806. The log book (10 October – 17 February 1808) was kept by master J. P. Abel. On 31 January 1808, she was taken as a prize by HMS Sceptre.
