= Kongen af Danmark (1788 DAC ship) =

Chinaman of the Danish Asiatic Company

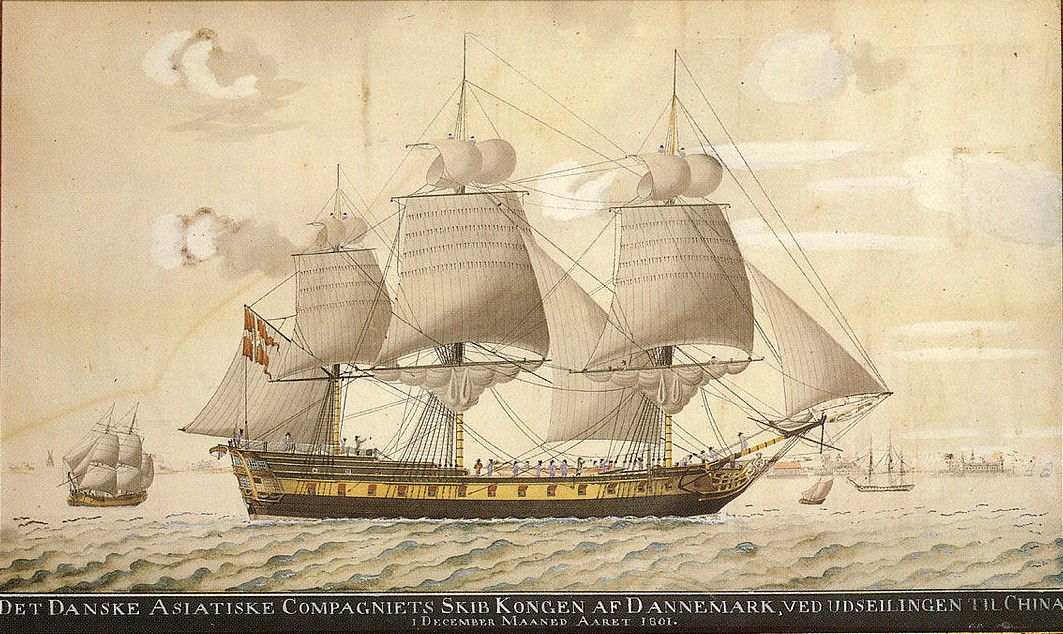

Denmark
- Name: Kongen af Danmark
- Owner: Danish Asiatic Company
- Builder: Asiatisk Plads
- Launched: January 1735
- In service: 1735-44
- Fate: Wrecked

General characteristics
- Class & type: Frigate
- Complement: 141

Kongen af Danmark was a Chinaman of the Danish Asiatic Company, built at Asiatisk Plads in 1788. She was the fifth DAC ship with this name.

== Construction and design ==
Kongen af Danmark was constructed by master shipbuilder Christian Bruus at Asiatisk Plads in 1788. It was the 30th DAC ship built at Asiatisk Plads and the fifth DAC ship with that name.

== DAC career ==
She completed five expeditions to Canton. Her captains were Jens Nielsen Tørslew (1788-1789), Andreas Halkiær (1794-1795), Jens Winther (1797-1798) and O.D.L. Agerbeck (1801-1802).

== Fate ==
The ship was only just able to make it back from her last expedition to Canton. Her hull contained seven of water as she arrived in Copenhagen. She was therefore broken up the same year.
