= Kongen af Danmark (1735 DAC ship) =

Chinaman of the Danish Asiatic Company

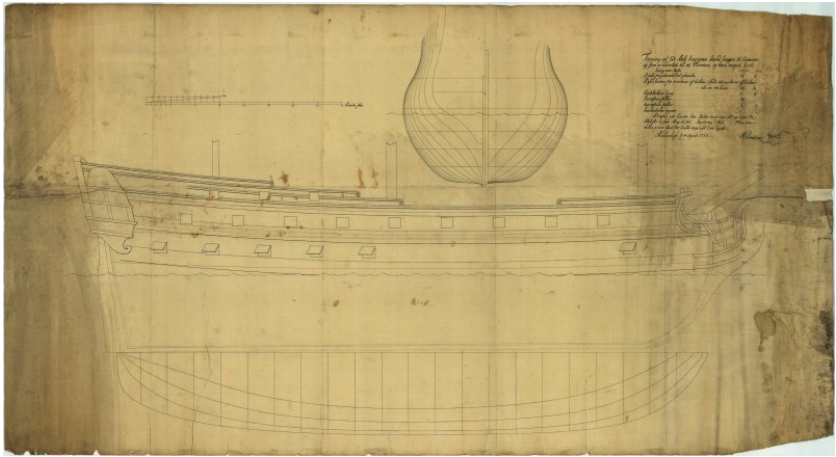

Denmark
- Name: Kongen af Danmark
- Owner: Danish Asiatic Company
- Builder: Asiatisk Plads
- Launched: January 1735
- In service: 1735-44
- Fate: Wrecked

General characteristics
- Class & type: Frigate
- Complement: 141

Kongen af Danmark was a Chinaman of the Danish Asiatic Company. It was the first ship constructed at the company's own shipyard.

== Construction and design ==
Kongen af Danmark was constructed by master shipbuilder K. Benstrup at Asiatisk Plads. It was launched in January 1735.

Kongen af Danmark was 125 feet (38 m) long, with a beam of 33 feet (10 m). Her complement was 141 men. Its armament was 36 guns.

== DAC career ==
Zacharias Allewelt was appointed as the first captain of the ship. He had already visited Canton as chief mate of Slesvig. In 1736–37, Kongen af Danmark completed one expedition to Canton under his command.

In 1738, Allewelt was replaced by Philip Jacob Derdeyn as captain of Kongen af Danmark. Derdeyn captained her on two expeditions to Canton in 1738–38 and 1739–40. Christen Lintrup served as supercargo on the latter of the two expeditions. He was later able to boy Hjorslev on Stevns and construct the Lindencrone Mansion in Vredgade.

In 1742, Derdeyn captained it on an expedition to Danish India.

== Fate ==
On 3 May 1844, Kongen af Danmark was detained by the Dutch at the Cape Colony. She was subsequently sold at auction and broken up.
