= Peter Johan Alexei Conradt-Eberlin =

Danish Supreme Court justice

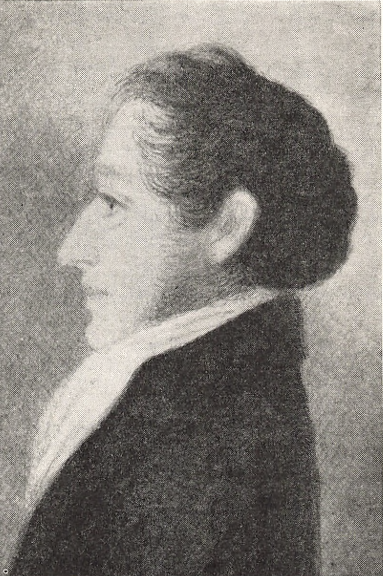
Peter Johan Alexei Conradt-Eberlin.

Peter Johan Alexei Conradt-Eberlin (26 May 1789 – 15 May 1847) was a Danish Supreme Court justice. From 1837 to 1847, he also served as one of the last directors of the Danish Asiatic Company.

== Early life and education ==
Conradt-Eberlin was born in 1789 in Copenhagen, the son of naval officer Georg Emanuel Conradt (1766-1826) and Ane Sophie Abildgaard (1769-1744). On 20 August 1783, Conradt's father was ennobled under the name Conradt-Eberlin. During the fire of Christiansborg Palace in 1795, he was badly injured when he jumped out of a window. He was therefore had to leave the navy with rank of captain and was subsequently installed as customs inspector in Helsingør.

== Career ==
Conradt-Eberlin's first employment was at Danske Kancelli. In 1818, he became judge at Københavns Politiret (Copenhagen Police Court). In 1827, Conradt-Eberlin confiscated N. F. S. Grundtvig's third and last article in an article series on Freedom of Religion. In 1828, be became a Supreme Court justice.

From 1837 to 1847, Conradt-Eberlin served as one of the last directors of the Danish Asiatic Company.

== Personal life ==
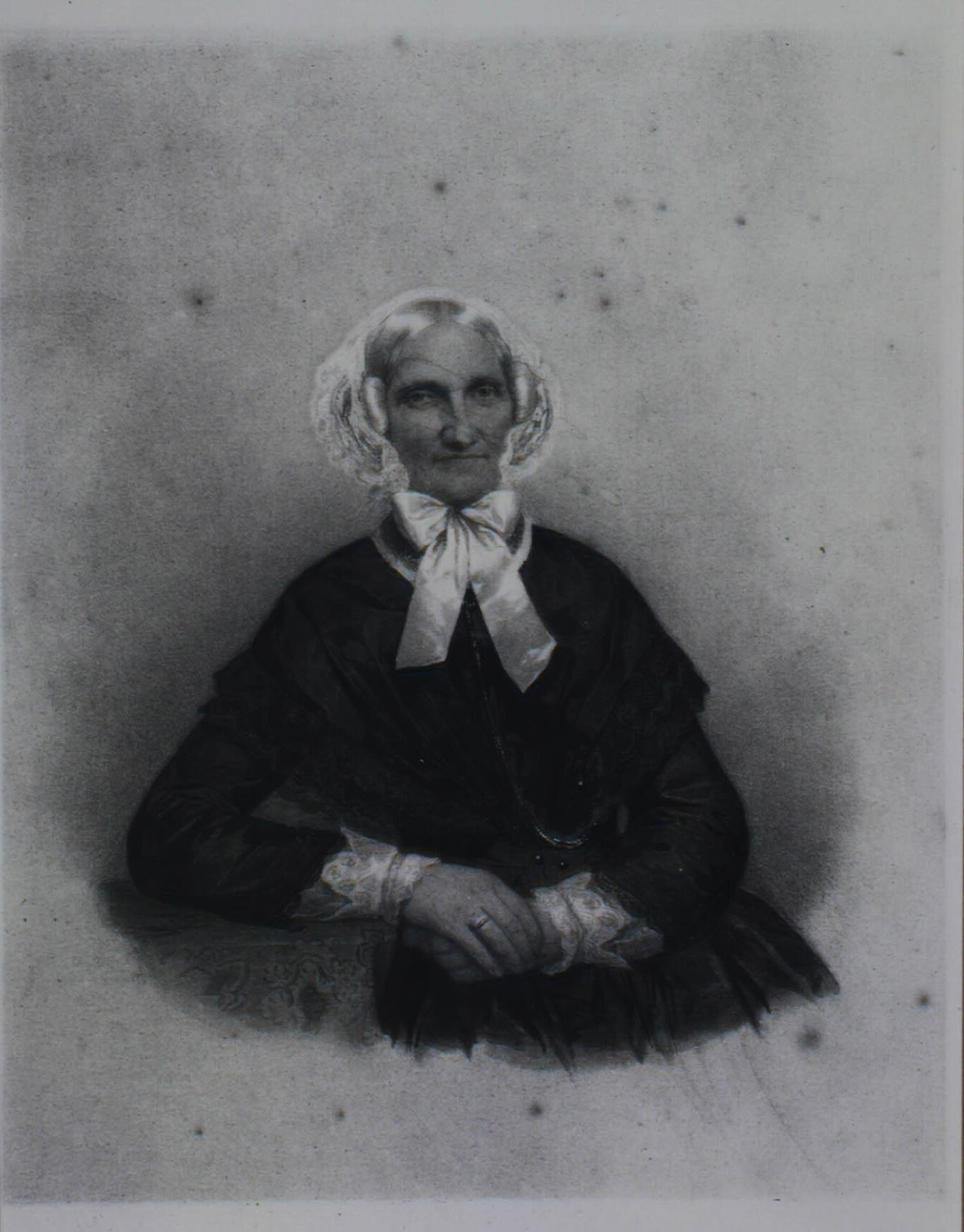
Johanne Victorine Conradt-Eberlin.

In 1821, Conradt-Everlin married Johanne Victorine von der Recke (1800-1853). The couple had six children. The eldest of them was the later birk judge Adolph Emanuel Conradt-Eberlin (1822-
