= Prinsesse Wilhelmine Caroline (DAC ship) =

1750 Danish East Indiaman ship

Prinsesse Wilhelmine Caroline was an East Indiaman of the Danish Asiatic Company.

== Construction ==
The Prinsesse Wilhelmine Caroline was built at the Danish Asiatic Company's own shipyard under the directions of master shipbuilder Anders Thuresen. She was launched in 1750. She was the ninth ship built at Asiatisk Plads. She was named for the three-year-old Princess Wilhelmina Caroline. The construction cost was 46,065 Danish rigsdaler.

== Career ==
The Prinsesse Wilhelmine Caroline departed from Copenhagen on 30 December 1751, bound for Tranquebar. She carried a cargo with a total value of 150,000 Danish rigsdaler of which 139.841 rigsdaler (93%) was silver and the rest (139.841 rigsdaler) was "other metals". She arrived at Tranquebar on 16 July 1752. She departed from Tranquebar on 30 October 1752, bound for Copenhagen. She saluted Kronborg Castle on 9 June, marking her safe return to Danish waters. Her return cargo was sold at auction in Copenhagen for 283,939 eigsdaler.

Later in the same year, she was sent to Vanton. She wrecked near St, Helena on the homebound voyage.
