= Kongen af Danmark (1769 DAC ship) =

1769 ship

Kongen af Danmark was a Chinaman of the Danish Asiatic Company, launched in 1769.

== Construction and design ==
Kongen af Danmark was constructed at the Danish Asiatic Company's own dockyard at Asiatisk Plads in Copenhagen. She was built under the directions of master shipbuilder Poul Frantzen. Her bilbrev was issued on 11 November 1769.

== Career ==
1769-1770

Kongen af Danmark was captained by Jørgen Dixen in 1769–1770. Niels Fursman served as 1st supercargo on the expedition. Mathias Trige served as 2nd supercargo.

1771-1773

Kongen af Danmark was captained by Mads Schifter on her second expedition to Canton in 1771–1773. She called at Tranquebar in June 1772.

1773-1775

Kongen af Danmark was again captained by Schifter on her third expedition to Canton in 1773–1775. Peder Ruch served as 1st supercargp on the expedition. She called at Tranquebar on the outbound voyage. David Brown and Thøger Nicolay Wcsterholt were among the passengers on this first leg of the voyage. Brown was accompanied by his wife and children. He had just been appointed as Governor of Danish India. The ship reached Tranquebar on 3 June 1774.

1775-1777

Kongen af Danmark was again captained by Mads Schifter on her next expedition to Canton in 1775–1777. The log book covers the period 12 December 1771 – 9 June 1777.

1777-1779

Jingen af Danmark sailed on her next expedition to Canton in 1777–1779. Peder Ruch was back as 1st supercargo on the expedition. In the meantime, he had served as 1st supergo on board the Fronning Juliana Maria in 1775–1888.

1779-1781

She was captained by Christen Kierulf on her next expedition to Canton in

1781-1782

She was captained by Diederich Bagge on her last expedition to Canton in 1781–1782.

== Fate ==
Kongen af Danmark was sold in 1785 to H. G. Halkier and broken up.
