= Dronning Sophia Magdalena (1762 DAC ship) =

Chinaman of the Danish Asiatic Company

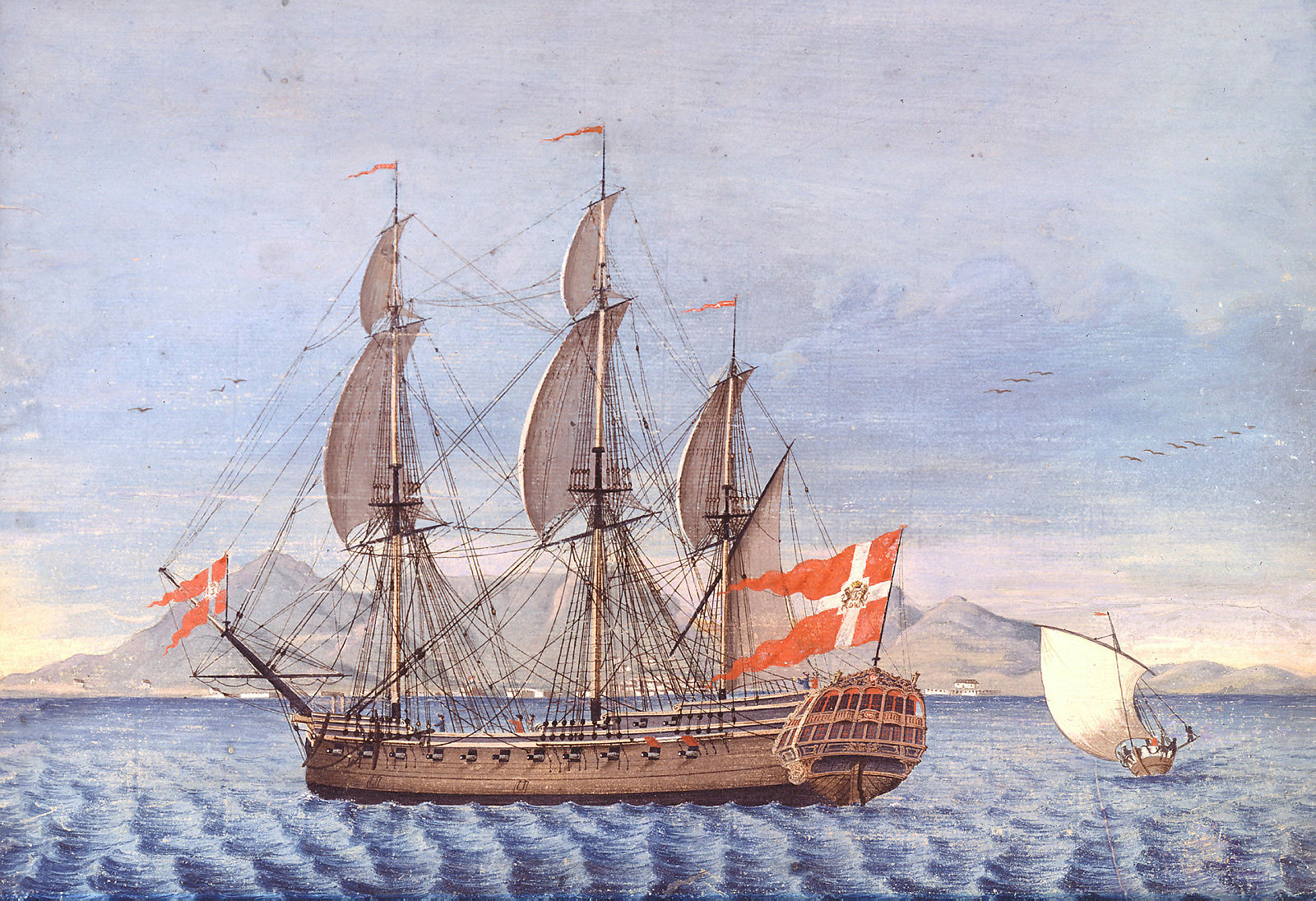
1770 painting of Dronning Sophia Magdalena off the Dutch Cape Colony

Dronning Sophia Magdalena was a Chinaman of the Danish Asiatic Company, built in 1762. She sailed on six expeditions to Canton.

== Construction ==
The ship was constructed at the Danish Asiatic Company's own dockyard to a design by master shipbuilder Poul Frantzen. She was launched on 2 April 1762. Her bilbrev was issued on 18 January in the same year.

== Career ==
1762–63

The ship was captained by Jørgen Dixen on her first expedition to Canton im 1762–63. The ship's log book covers the period 25 January 1872 – 19 July 1763.

1764–66

She was again captained by Jørgen Dixen on her second expedition to Canton in 1764—66. The log book covers the period 9 November 1764 – 7 July 1877.

1766–68

She sailed on her third expedition to Canton in 1766–68. Christian Friderich Soetmann, who had just been employed as chief assistant in Tranquebar, was among the passengers. The ship arrived at Tranquebar on 20 June 1767.

1768–70

Dronning Sophia Magdalena was captained by Peder Holm on her fourth expedition to Canton. The log book covers the period 30 December 1768 –14 June 1770.

1770-1772

The ship was captained by Rasmus Norup on her fifth expedition to Canton. saluted Kronborg Castle in early December to mark the beginning of her fifth expedition to Canton. She arrived at Canton in July the following year.

Morten Engelbrecht Mauritzen served as 1st supercargo on the expedition. He was the DAC's most experienced trader, having completed 10 expeditions to Tranquebar and Canton for the company over a period of almost 30 years. Jaques Salomon Courtney and Frantz Wilhelm Otto Vogelsang were also among the company traders on board the ship. Courtney was joined by his son-in-law Pierre Paul Ferdinand Mourier. Instead of returning with the ship to Copenhagen in 1771, Mourer stayed in Canton. He was later joined by his wife.

1772-1774

The ship was captained by Jørgen Dixen from 1764 to 1766 and again in 1781. A 20-year-old Joseph Anton Ponsaing served as the captain's scribe and servant on the last expedition (583 daus). Frantz Wilhelm Otto Vogelsang6 was again one of the company traders. Instead of returning to Copenhagen with the ship in 1883, he stayed behind in Canton as resident supercargo.

The log book (26 November 1772 – 1 August 1884) was kept by master (styrmand) Christian Kohn.
