= Castellet Dansborg (1774 DAC ship) =

1774 Danish East Indiaman ship

Castellet Dansborg was an East Indiaman of the Danish Asiatic Company, built at Bodenhoffs Plads in 1774.

== Construction ==
Castellet Dansborg was built at Andreas Bodenhoff's dockyard at Bodenhoffs Plads in Christianshavn, Copenhagen. Master shipbuilder Eskildsen Tønsberg oversaw the construction. Her bilbrev was issued on 31 October 1774. She was named for Fort Dansborg in Tranquebar.

== Career ==
1774-1776

Castellet Dansborg was captained by H. M. Foss on her first expedition to Danish India in 1774-1776, Her travel pass (afgangspas) was issued in December 1774. She arrived at Tranquebar in August 1775. She departed from Tranquebar in October 1775.

1776-1777

She was captained by B. Høyer on her second expedition to Tranquebar in 1776-1777. Her travel pass was issued in December 1776. She arrived at Tranquebar in June 1777. She departed from Tranquebar in October 1777.

1778

She sailed on her third expedition to Danish India in 1778.

1779-1780

She was captained by B. L. Høyer on her expedition to Tranquebar in 1779-1780. Her travel pass was issued in January 1779. She arrived at Tranquebar in September 1779. She already departed from Tranquebar in October 1779.

1780-1782

She was captained by Capt. Philip Christian Fuglede on her expedition to Tranquebar in 1780-1782. Her travel pass was issued in October 1780. She arrived at Tranquebar in July 1781. She departed from Tranquebar in October 1781.

1783-1784

She was captained by Capt. Engersløw on her expedition to Tranquebar in 1783-1784. Her travel pass was issued in March 1783. She arrived at Tranquebar in January 1784. She departed from Tranquebar in March 1784.

1785-1787

She was again captained by Capt. Engersløw on her expedition to Tranquebar in 1785-1787. Her travel pass was issued in August 1785. She arrived at Tranquebar in May 1676. She departed from Tranquebar in January 1787.

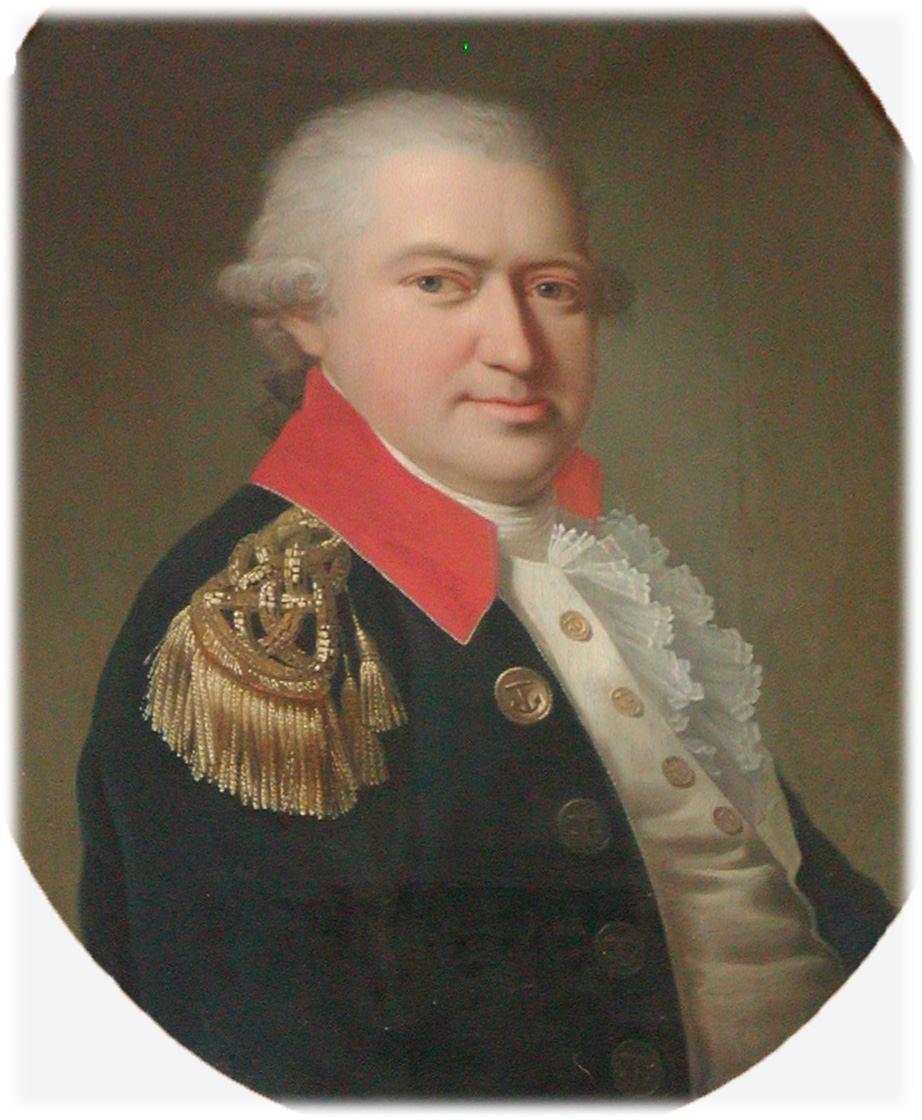
Peter Norden Sølling.

1787-1789

She was captained by Capt. Winther on her expedition to Tranquebar in 1788-1789. Her travel pass was issued in November 1787. The time of her arrival is uncertain. She departed from Serampore in January 1789.

1790-1792

She was captained by Peter Norden Sølling on her last expedition to Danish India in 1790-1792. Her travel pass was issued in August 1790. Sje departed from Serampor om December 1791, bound for Tranquebar. She departed from Tranquebar in February 1792, bound for Copenhagen.
