= Kongen af Danmark (1745 DAC ship) =

Chinaman of the Danish Asiatic Company, built in 1745

Kongen af Danmark was a Chinaman of the Danish Asiatic Company, built in 1745.

== Construction and design ==
Kongen af Danmark was constructed at the Danish Asiatic Company's own dockyard at Asiatisk Plads in Copenhagen. She was launched on 30 November 1745.

== Career ==
1746–1747

Kongen af Danmark was captained by Svend Hvas on her first expedition to Canton in 1746–47.

1748–1750

She was captained by Jesper With on her second expedition to Canton in 1748–1749. Søren Lycke served as supercargo on the expedition. With set sail from Copenhagen on 29 December 1748, She anchored at Whampoa in late July 1840. The ship was subsequently inspected by Mandarins from Bocca Tigris. Kongen af Danmark set sail from Whampoa on 27 December 1749, bound for Copenhagen. She arrived back in Copenhagen on 28 June 1750.

1750–1751

Lyder Ridder Holmann is mentioned as the captain of the ship 1750–1751. This expedition is not mentioned in Jørgen Marcussen's overview of DAC expeditions.

Lyder Ridder Holmann (then with rank of overstyrmand) was married to Anne Cathrine Trøstrup pm 10 December 1745.
