= Dannebrog (DAC ship) =

1786 Danish East Indiaman ship

Dannebrog, also spelled Dannebroge, was an East Indiaman of the Danish Asiatic Company, bought in England in 1786. She sailed on eight expeditions to Danish India.

== Origins ==
The ship was bought by the Danish Asiatic Company on 22 May 1786 in England. She belonged to Henrik Bolten in 1783. She was captained by Bøye Michel Bøyesen (Boyesen) 1782–1785. She was subsequently subject to comprehensive work at the Danish Asiatic Company's own dockyard. She is considered ship No. 29 from Asiatisk Plads.

== Career ==
1786–1788

Dannebrog was captained by Johan Christopher Berg on her first DAC expedition to Tranquebar in 1786–1788. Her travel pass was issued in September 1786. Later Governor of Frederiknagore Jacob Kræfting was on board the ship as a passenger. Dannebrog arrived at Tranquebar on 26 May 1787. After a few months, she continued to Serampore. Jens Boalth was a passenger on board the ship on this leg of the voyage. Dannebrog reached Serampore on 8 September 1787. She set sail from Serampore in January 1788, bound for Copenhagen.

The ship's log book (kept by Berg) covers the period 23 September – 19 July 1788.

1788–1791

She was again captained by Johan Christopher Berg on her next expedition to Danish India in 1788–1791. Her travel pass was issued in October 1788. She arrived at Tranquebar in May 1789. She later continued to Serampore. She set sail from Serampore in December 1790.

The log book (kept by Berg) covers the period 21 November 1788 – 25 June 1791.

1792–1793

She was captained by Johannes Rosenquist on her third expedition to Danish India in 1792–1793 . Her travel pass was issued in April 1792. The log book (kept by Rosenquist) covers the period 4 April 1793 – 3 Dec ember 1793.

1795–1796

She was captained by Jens Winther on her fourth expedition to Danish India in 1795–1796. Her travel pass was issued in May 1795. She sailed from Serampore in March 1796, bound for Copenhagen.

1797–1798

She was captained by Otto Lütken Agerbeck (1747–1806) on her next expedition to Danish India in 1797–1798. Her travel pass was issued in May 1797. She reached Tranquebar in September 1797. She sailed from Serampore in January 1798.

The log book (kept by Agerbeck) covers the period 16 March 1797 – 20 July 1798.

1799-1800

She was again captained by Agerbeck on her next expedition to Danish India in 1799–1800. Her travel pass was issued in June 1688.Ulrik Christian Schnell Wedege was on board the ship as a passenger. Dannebrog sailed from Serampore in March 1800.

The log book (kept by Agerbeck) covers the period 7 May 1799 – 17 September 1800.

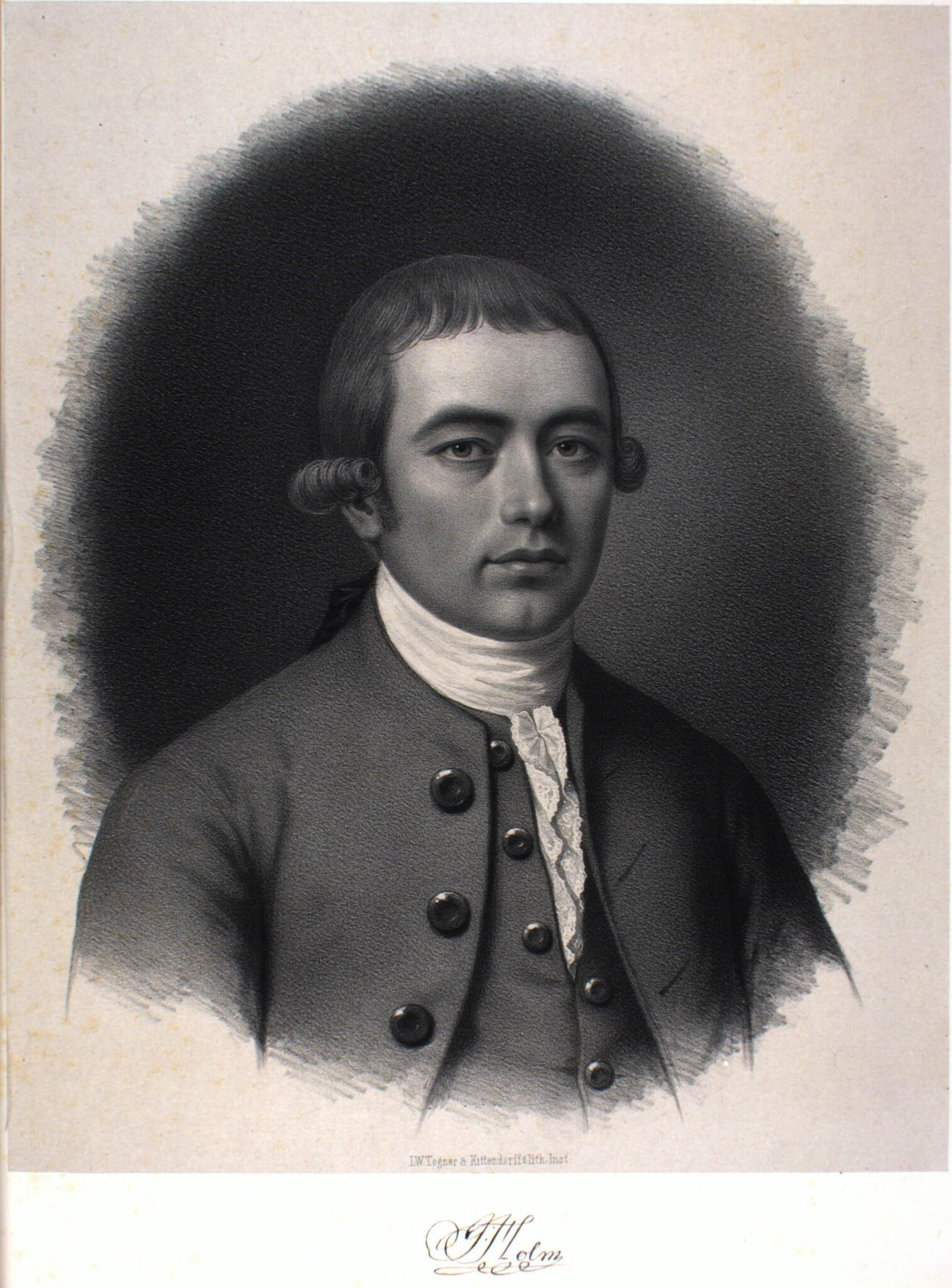
Jens Holm (1760–1807)

Agerbeck discontinued his career in the service of the Danish Asiatic Company not long thereafter. He spent his last years as alderman of the Pilot's Guild in Copenhagen. In 1804, he published his memoirs.

1802–1804

She was captained by Jens Axel Holm (1760–1807) on her next expedition to Danish India in 1802–1804. Her travel pass was issued in April 1802. She sailed from Serampore in May 1803, bound for Copenhagen.

The log book (kept by Holm) covers the period 22 March 1802 – 12 May 1804.

1804–1806

She was captained by Andreas Tranberg on what would become her last expedition to Danish India.

The log book (kept by Tranberg) covers the period 17 October 1804 – 15 January 1806.

== Fate ==
The war with England kept Dannebrog from being sent on further expeditions to Danish India. The source states that she was sold in c. 1810.
