= Mathias Lunding =

Danish politician and brewer (1728–1788)

Mathias Lunding (21 June 1728 – 21 June 1788) was a brewer who served as burgermaster of Copenhagen and director of the Danish Asiatic Company.

== Early life and background ==
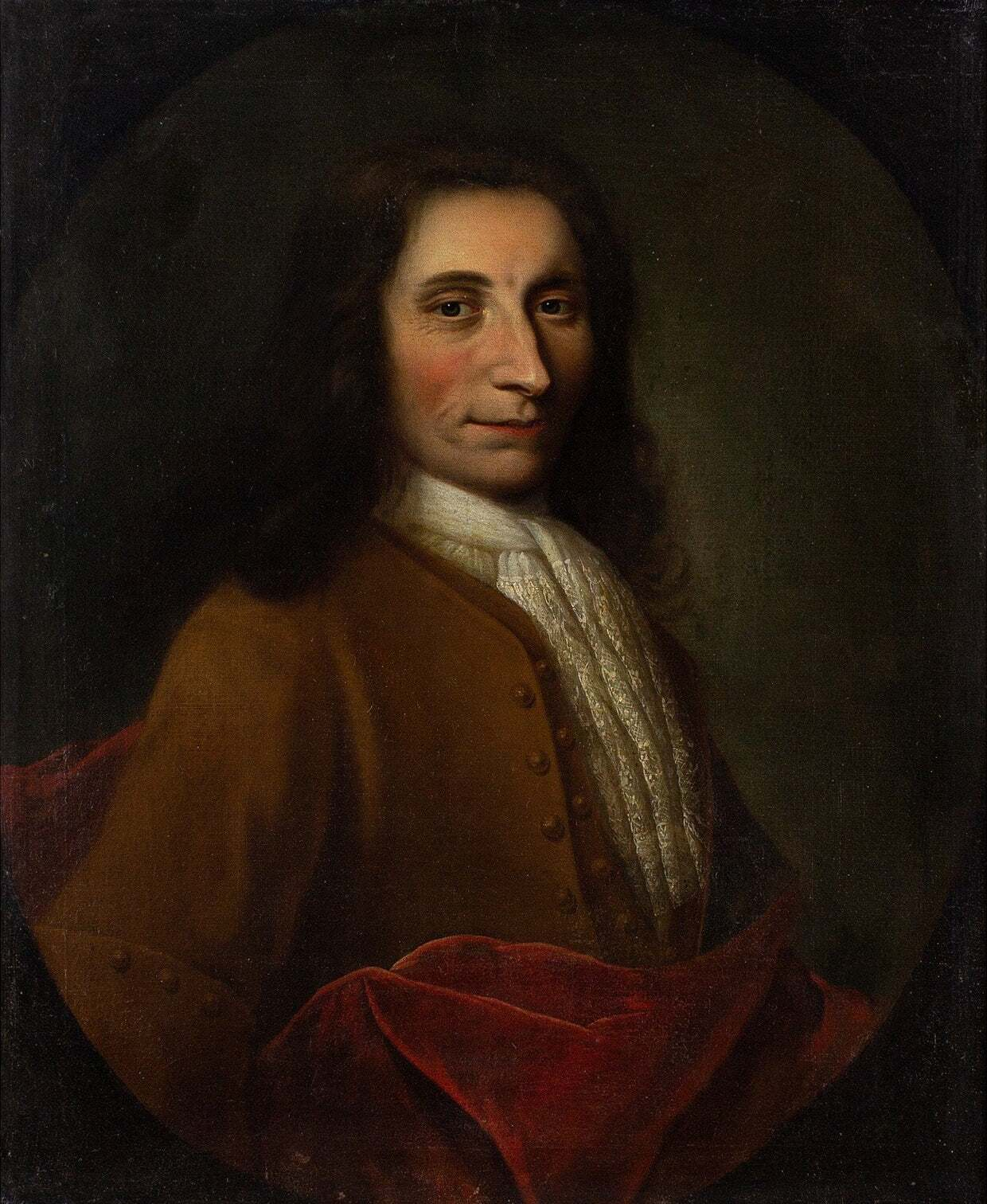
Mathias Ibsen Lunding, Lunding's father.

Lunding was born on 21 June 1728 in Copenhagen, the son of ship captain Mathias Ibsen Lunding (1790–1728) and Kirstine Johanne Christensdatter (c. 1706–1771). The family lived in Copenhagen's maritime Christianshavn district. Lunding's father had assumed the surname after his home town, Lunding, a village in Stabæk Parish, Haderslev. He is considered the founder of the patrician Lunding family. During the Great Northern War, Lunding's father was captured by a Swedish privateer and brought to Gothenburg. He later managed to escape by attacking his guard. His injuries from the affair contributed to his early death a few years later, just a ffew months after Lunding was born. Balthasar Denner has painted a portrait of him.

Lunding's mother married again on 15 November 1730 to wine merchant (grosserer) Hans Pedersen Kinchel (c. 1703 – 1767).

== Career ==
On 25 April 1759, Lunding acquired citizenship as a brewer. In 1767, he was appointed as councillor (kommiteret) in the city's Poor Authority (Københavns Fattigvæsen), Overformynder and Administrator of Møn Prison. On 1 January 1768, he was elected as vice mayor of Copenhagen. The Copenhagen Magistrate (Københavns Magistrat; comprising mayors, vice mayors and councilmen) was dissolved by C. F. Struense just two months later (3 April). After Struense's fall, on 3 August 1771, Lunding became part of a commission tasked with reestablishing the government of Copenhagen. In 1772–1782, he once again served as vice mayor of the city. In 1772, he was also appointed as director of the Royal Orphanage (den kgl. Opfostringsstiftelse). In 1776, he was appointed as one of the directors of the Almindelige Enkekasse (General Widows Trust). In 1778, he was appointed as one of the directors of Brand Assurance Compagniet for Varer og Effekter, a fire insurance company complementing Hjøbenhavns Brandforsikring. In 1782, he became a councillor (kommiteret) in Søkommissariatskollegiet (merged with the Admiralty College in 1784). In the same year (15 May), he became a member of a port commission. In 1783, he was elected as chief legal officer (juridisk direktør) of the Danish Asiatic Company.

== Personal life ==
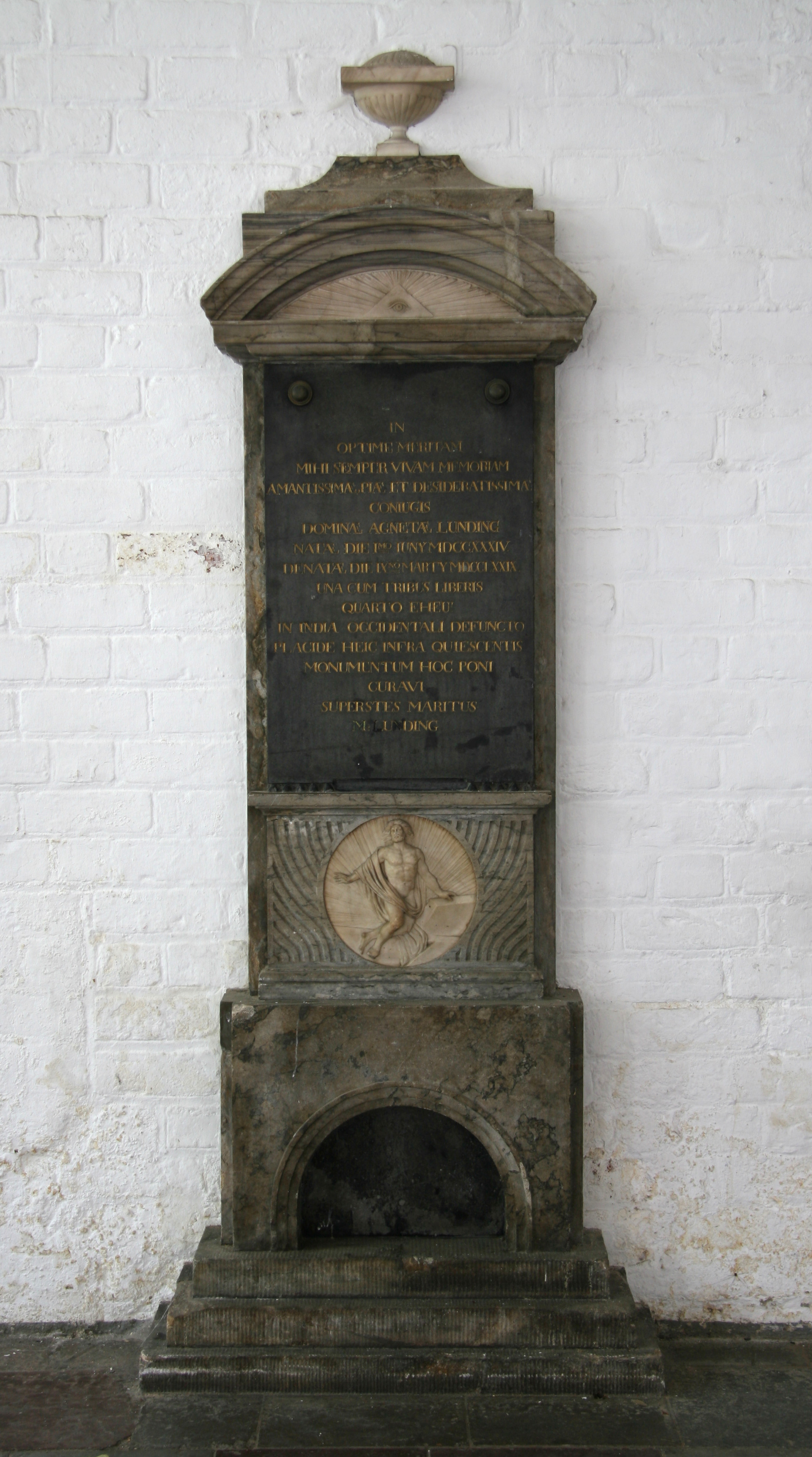
Rpitaph to Agnete Lunding in the Church of the Holy Ghost in Copenhagen.

Lunding was married on 3 October 1759 ito Agnetha Schiøtt (1734–1779). She was a daughter of Justitsraad Niels Schiøtt andShe bore him six children.

Lunding's wife died on 9 March 1779 in Copenhagen. She is buried in the bural chapel of the Church of the Holy Ghost. She is commemorated by an epitaph in the House of the Holy Ghost.

Lunding died on 21 June 1788 in Copenhagen. He was buried in the family's burial chapel in the Church of the Holy Ghost.

== Awards ==
Lunding was awarded the title of justitsråd on 21 October 1774, etatsråd on 7 October 1778 and Konferensraad on 18 April 1781.
