= Christianshavn (DAC ship) =

1798 Danish ship

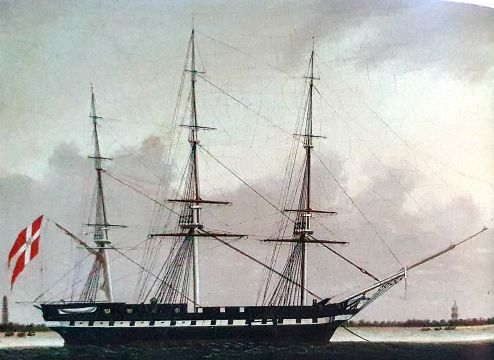
Christianshavn

Christianshavn was an East Indiaman of the Danish Asiatic Company, which she served from 1800 until 1834. The poet Poul Martin Møller served as ship's chaplain on board the ship on an expedition to Canton and Manilla in 1819–20. She was renamed Frederik VI (Frederik den Siette) after undergoing a complete overhaul at the Royal Dockyard in Copenhagen in 1828. She completed the Danish Asiatic Company's last expedition to China in 1834–34.

== Origins ==
The ship was a British ship captured by the French Navy near the colony of Isle de France in 1798. She was first acquired by Selbye & Terboch and then in 1800 sold to the Danish Asiatic Company in 1800 and subsequently renamed Christianshavn. She was renamed Frederik VI circa 1828.

== DAC service ==
=== Christianshavn ===
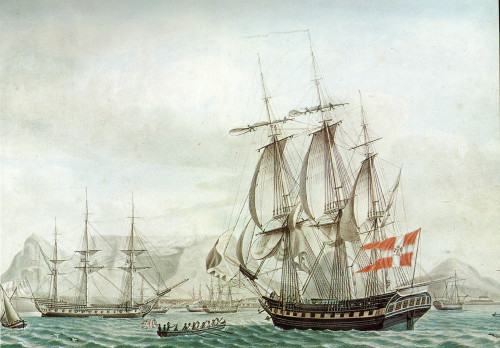
Christianshavn calling at Cape Town

1801–02

Christianshavn completed its first DAC expedition in 1801-02. It was in Batavia.

1803–05

Captain Poul Christensen and Master (styrmand) Jens Jensen sailed from Copenhagen on 8 July 1703m bound for Canton. Christianshavn arrived back in Copenhagen on 1 July 1805.

1806–07

Captain Svend Wilhelm Ørgaard and Master (styrmand) J. A. Ponsaing sailed from Copenhagen on 24 February 1806, bound for Canton and Manilla. Christianshavn arrived back in Copenhagen on 15 June 1807.

1819–21

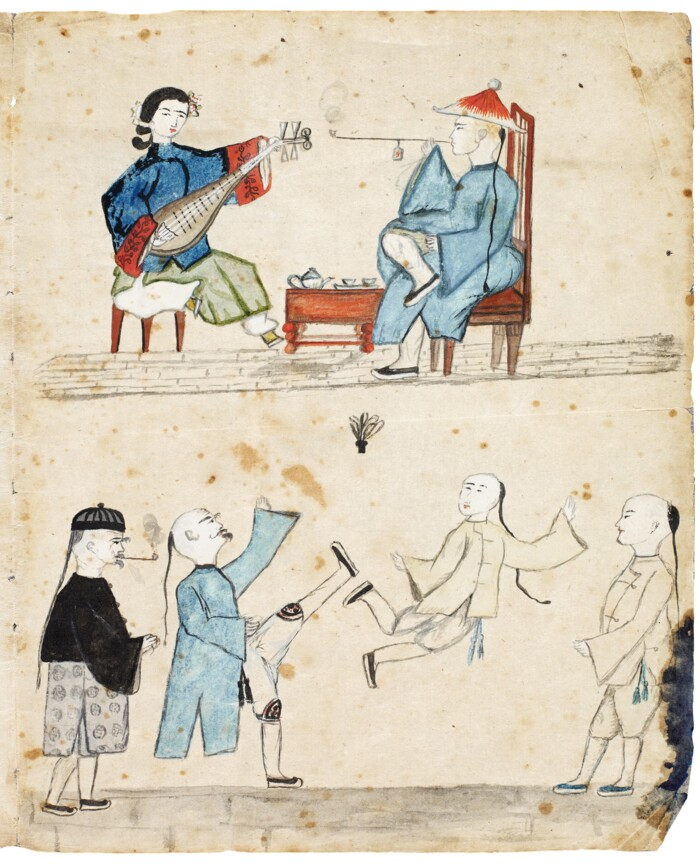
Drawings from Møller's sketchbook

Christianshavn was one of only two ships still owned by the Danish Asiatic Company at the war ended in 1914. The other one was Kronprindsessen.

Captain Georg Gottlob Stage (1766–1826) and Master (styrmand) J. S. Hørgensen sailed from Copenhagen on 1 October 1819, bound for Canton. Christianshavn arrived back in Copenhagen on 16 July 1821.

The poet Poul Martin Møller served as chaplain on the expedition. Møller wrote in his diary and created drawings in his sketchbook during the expedition.

1826–27

Master (styrmand) J. A. Thellesen sailed from Copenhagen on 7 April 1826m bound for Canton. Christianshavn arrived back in Copenhagen on 23 September 1827.

=== Frederik VI ===
1829–30

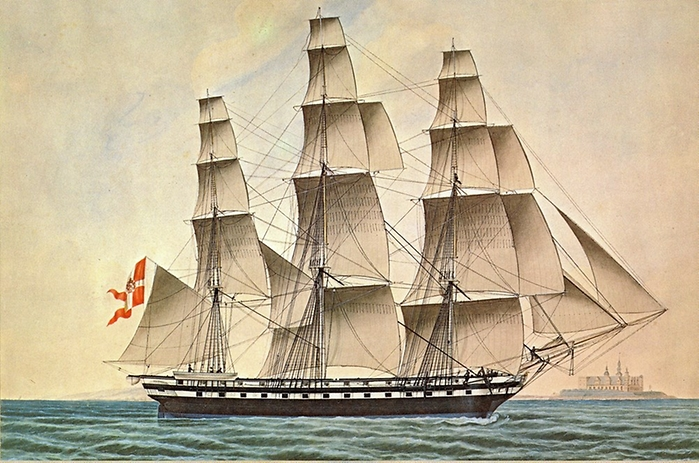
Frederik VI

The sale of Kronprindsessen in 1827 had left Christianshavn as the last ship still owned by the Danish Asiatic Company. Christianshavn was subject to a complete overhaul at the Royal Dockyard in 1828. She was subsequently renamed Frederik CI,

Captain Christian Carl Tronier sailed from Copenhagen on 21 April 1728, bound for Canton. Frederik VI arrived back in Copenhagen on 12 September 1830.

1833–34

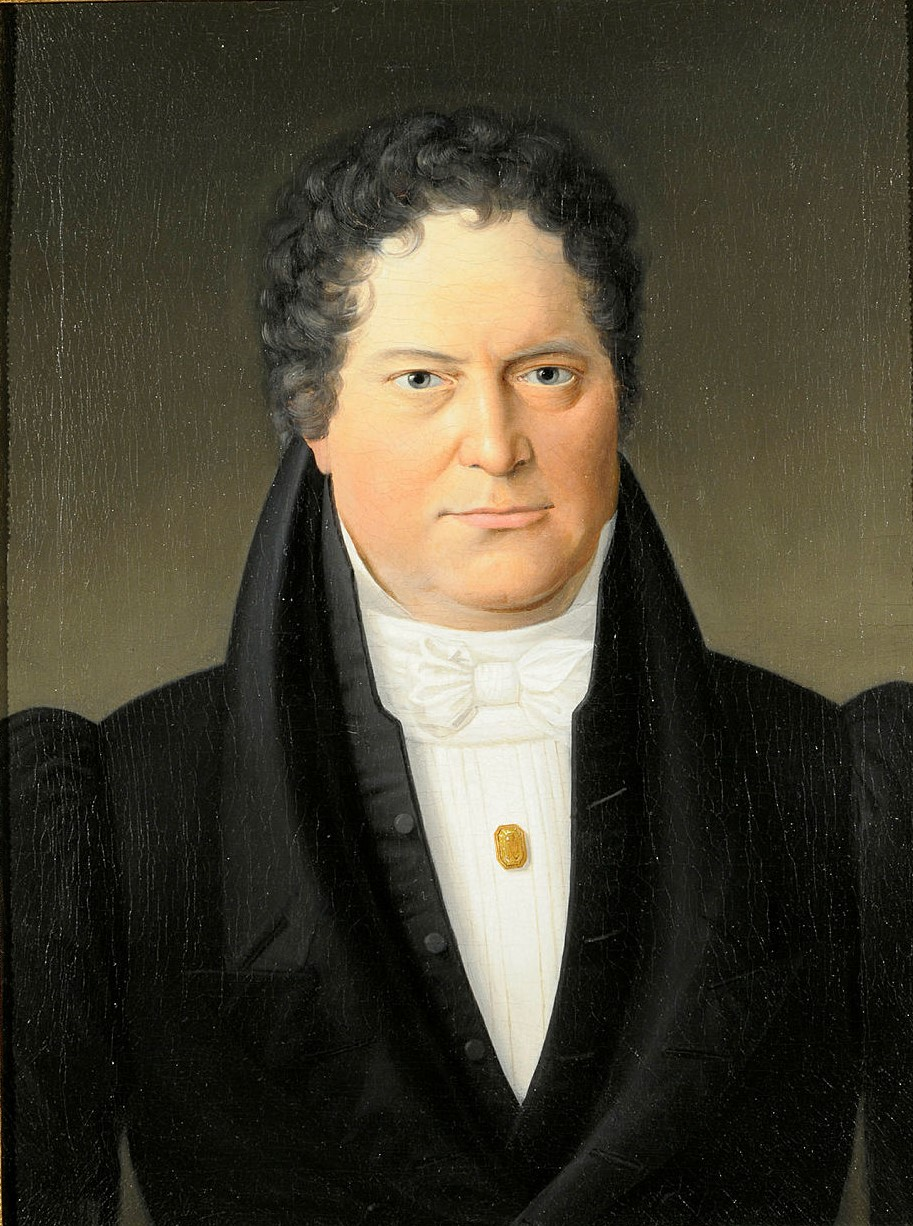
Richard Bentley

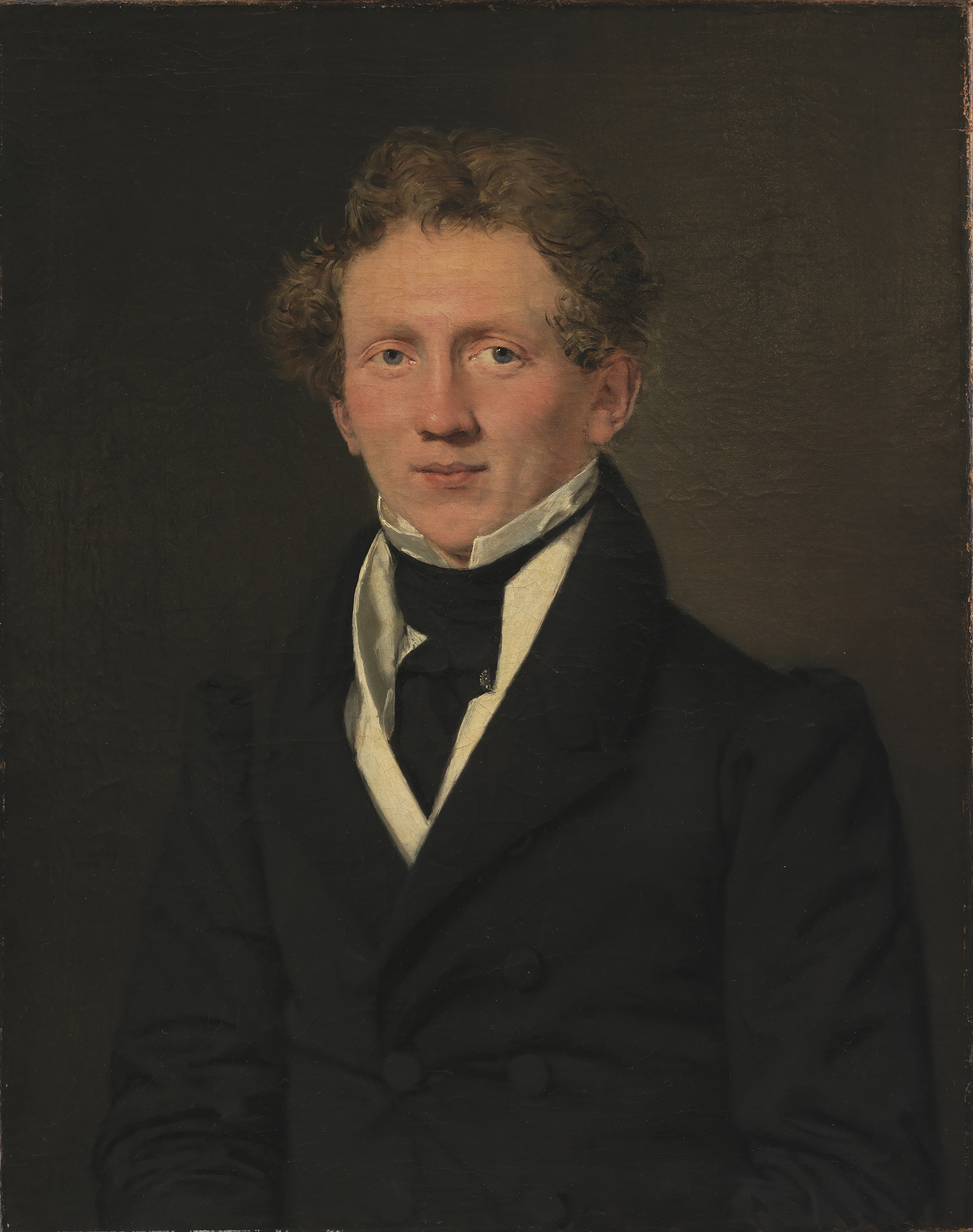
Theodor Emil Ludvigsen

Frederik VI was sent to Canton and Manilla on the last DAC expedition. Captain Jens Seidelin, a naval officer, was appointed as captain of the ship on her last voyage. Richard Bentley served as supercargo on the expedition. It was Bentley's eighth DAC expedition to China. Theodor Emil Ludvigsen, another experienced company trader, was also part of the crew.

Frederik VI arrived back in Copenhagen in 1834. Ludvigsen was after the expedition entrusted with organizing the Danish Asiatic Company's archives.

== Fate ==
Frederik VI was sold to CEO in 1830. In 1841, she was sold to J. Owen in Copenhagen. in 1845, she was sold to the UK. She wrecked off Bintang Island at Sumatra in 1846.
