= Kronprinsessen af Danmark (DAC ship) =

1745 Danish East Indiaman ship

Kronprinsessen af Danmark (also spelled Cronprincessen af Danmark and Cron Prinsessen af Danmark) was an East Indiaman of the Danish Asiatic Company, launched at Asiatisk Plads in 1745. She made three expeditions to Tranquebar. She was able to make it only to the Cape of Good Hope on her last homebound voyage but her cargo was later picked up by two other ships.

== Construction ==
The Kronprinsessen af Danmark was built at the Danish Asiatic Company's own shipyard. She was named for the British-born crown princess, Louisa, whose spouse ascended the Danish throne as Frederick V in the following year. The construction cost was 31,435 rigsdaler.

== Career ==
=== 1745–47 ===
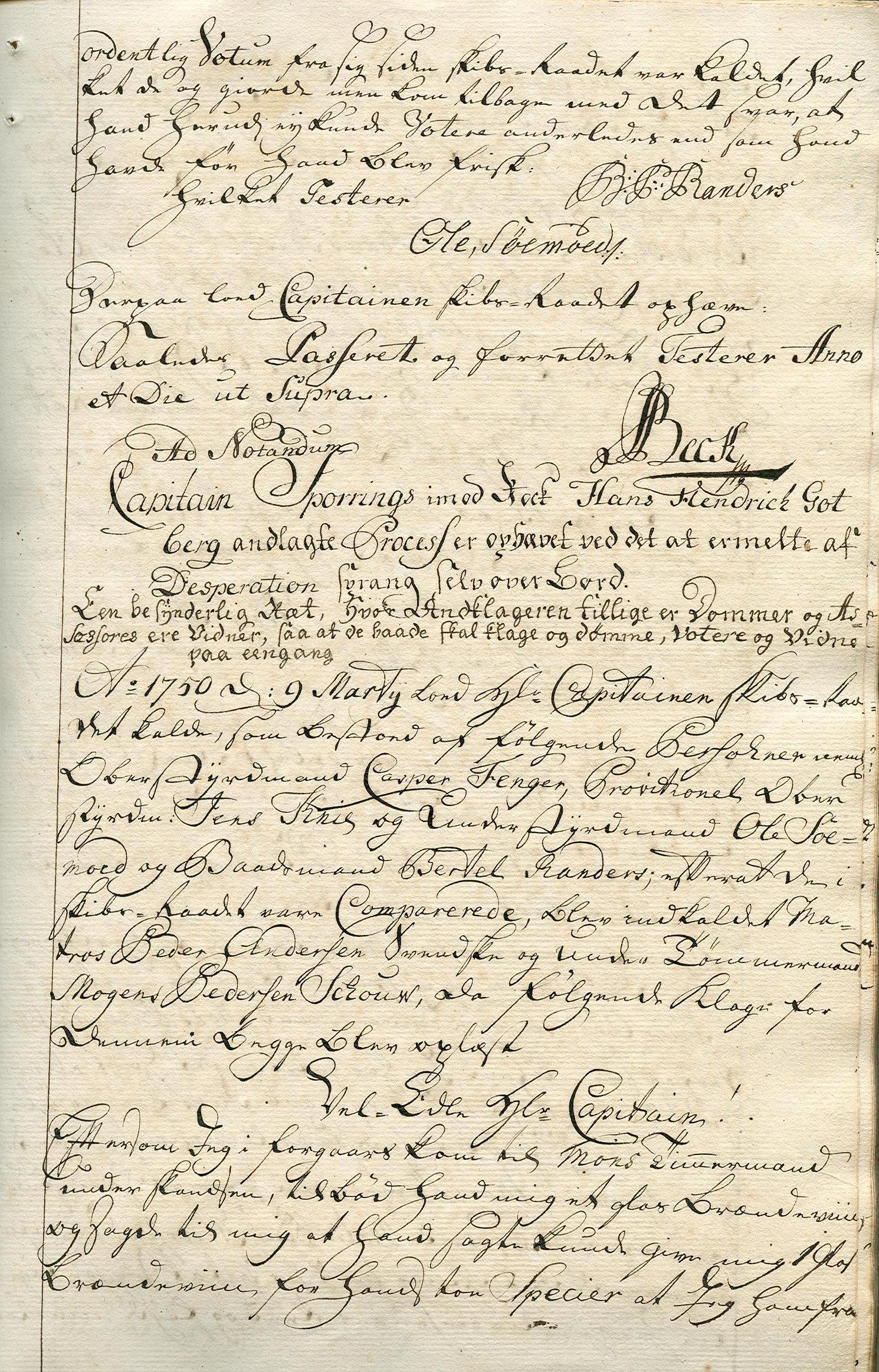
From Kronprinsessen's ship's protocol, 1748.

Kronprinsessen a Danmark was captained by Emanuel Sporing on her first expedition to Tranquebar. She set sail from Copenhagen on 15 December 1745, carrying a cargo with a total value of 130,000 rigsdaler of which 121,629 rigsdaler (94%) was silver and the rest (8,371 rigsdaler) was "other metals". The extraordinarily bad and unsanitary standard of the food led to numerous complaints from crew members. After calling at Atchin in Sumatra, Kronprinsessen af Danmark finally arrived at Tranquebar on 9 July 1746.

Kronprinsessen af Danmark departed from Tranquebar on 3 February 1747. The problems with the unsanitary standards of the food continued to such an extent that the ship's cook ended up being sentenced to 50 lashes with the cat o' nine tails as well as a fine of one month's salary. Just five hours after receiving the sentence, he committed suicide by jumping overboard.

On the homebound voyage, Kronprinsessen af Danmark called at the Cape of Good Hope for supplies. Before she was ready to continue the voyage, she was caught in bad weather. The lives of several crew members were lost when a barge capsized in an effort to save the ship.

On 7 September 1747, after 631 days, Kronprinsessen af Danmark was finally able to salute Kronborg Castle to mark her safe return to Danish waters.

=== 1748–50 ===
The Kronprinsessen af Danmark was again captained by Emanuel Sporing on her second expedition. She set sail from Copenhagen on 5 November 1748, bound for Tranquebar. She saluted Kronborg Castle two days later. She carried a cargo with a total value of 150,000 rigsdaler of which 139,893 rigsdaler (93%) was silver. The ship called at the Cape Verde Islands for fresh provisions in January. The Chagos Islands were sighted on 29 April 1840.

The Kronprinsessen af Danmark arrived at Tranquebar on 18 May 1749. She departed from Tranquebar on 5 November 1840 bound for Copenhagen. She saluted Kronborg Castle on 16 May 1750.

=== 1750–52 ===
Kronprinsessen af Danmark was captained by Svend Fenger on her third expedition to India. She set sail from Copenhagen on 12 October 1750, saluting Kronborg Castle on four days later to mark the beginning of her voyage. On the outbound voyage, she spent two weeks at the Cape trading and provisioning. She reached Tranquebar on 29 May 1751 and spent four months anchored at the roads of Tranquebar. A number of crew members died from disease and others deserted. A cargo of calico, timber and salt was taken aboard. On 3 November she continued to Calicut to pick up peber. Jacob Christoffer Soetmann and Nicolay Wichmann had both boarded the shop in Tranquebar. Soetmann had been tasked with establishing a Danish factory on the Malabar coast. Krpnprinsessen af Danmark arrived at Colledge on 27 January 1752. Soetmann bought 219 bar peber. Former governor Morten Mortensen Færoe returned to Copenhagen on board the ship in 1724.

The first leg of the homebound voyage was made in convoy with some British ships. The African coast was first sighted on 18 April but bad weather made it impossible to seek harbour. On 3 May, a leak in the hull was discovered. The situation was becoming still more desperate as decease spread among the crew and water supplies were running out.

On 28 August, Kronprinsessen was run aground near Mossel Bay in an attempt to save the desperately sick crew. The cargo was subsequently taken ashore. The ship was in such a poor state that it was impossible to repair it. The wreck was later sold at auction. The cargo was picked up by the ships Rigernes Ønske and Prins Christian, owned by the General Trading Company and the Danish West India Company, respectively.

== Legacy ==
The ship bell is in the collection of the National Museum of Denmark. It features the name of the ship as well as the letters "DAC" (Danish Asiatic Company) and the year "1745". The ship protocol is kept in the National Archives of Denmark. A commented edition has been published.
