= Dronning Sophia Magdalena (1747 DAC ship) =

1747 Danish East Indiaman ship

Dronningen af Danmark, renamed Dronning Sophia Magdalena in 1862. was an East Indiaman of the Danish Asiatic Company, constructed at Asiatisk Plads in 1747. The name was later transferred to another DAC East Indiaman, built Asiatisk Plads in 1762.

== Construction ==
Dronning Sophia Magdalena was constructed at Asiatisk Plads in 1747. Her first name was Dronningen af Danmark. In 1752, it was changed to Dronning Sophia Magdalena. She was the sister ship of Fredensborg Slot.

== DAC career ==
=== As Dronningen af Danmark ===
Jens Werner Akeleye (Archeleyem 1703–1882) was appointed as captain of the new ship. She sailed on two expeditions to Canton, first in 1749–50 and then in 1750–51.

=== As Dronning Sophia Magdalena ===
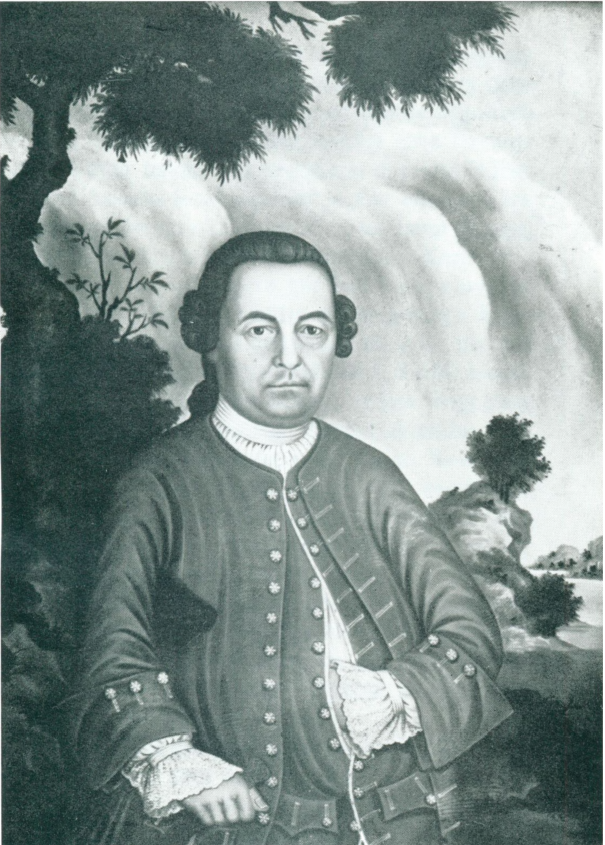
Lars Svane

1752–53

In 1752, Dronningen af Danmark was renamed Dronning Sophia Magdalena. Her next expedition to Canton took place from late 1752 to July 1754. The ship's log book covers the period 15 December 175–).

1754–55

She sailed on her next expedition to Canton in 1755–57. The log book (2 December 1755 – 22 May 1756) was kept by Johan Olivarius.

Tranquebar, 1757–59

Dronning Sophia Magdalena was sent to Tranquebar on her last DAC expedition in 1757–59. She was under the command of captain Lars Swane. The log book covers the period 8 November 1757 – 24 May 1759. The voyage was delayed by storms and headwind. The expedition was also hit hard by decease and deaths. Swane was also hit by decease. Dronning Sophia Magdalena arrived back in Copenhagen on 24 May 1759. The value of the cargo was relatively low at approximately 185,000 Danish rigsdaler.

== Fate ==
The ship is not mentioned after 1759. The name was later transferred to another DAC ship, built at Aisatisk Plads in 1762.

== See also ==
- Cron Printz Christian (DAC ship)
