= Kronprinsen af Danmark (1740 DAC ship) =

Frigate of the Danish Asiatic Company

Kronprinsen af Danmark, later renamed Kronprins (old spelling: Cronprintz), was a Chinaman of the Danish Asiatic Company, built at Asiatisk Plads in 1740. She sailed on two expeditions to Canton.

== Construction ==
The Kronprinsen af Danmark was built to a design by Knud Nielsen Benstrup at the Danish Asiatic Company's own shipyard. She was the third ship built at Asiatisk Plads.

== Career ==
The Kronprinsen af Danmark departed from Copenhagen in 1741, bound for Canton. She arrived back in Copenhagen in 1743.

The Cronprintz was captained by Jesper Richard on her second expedition to Canton. She sailed from Copenhagen in 1743, bound for Canton. She wrecked on 21 January 1745 off North Ronaldsay on the way back to Copenhagen.
