= Chinaman (ship) =

Any ship engaged in the Old China Trade

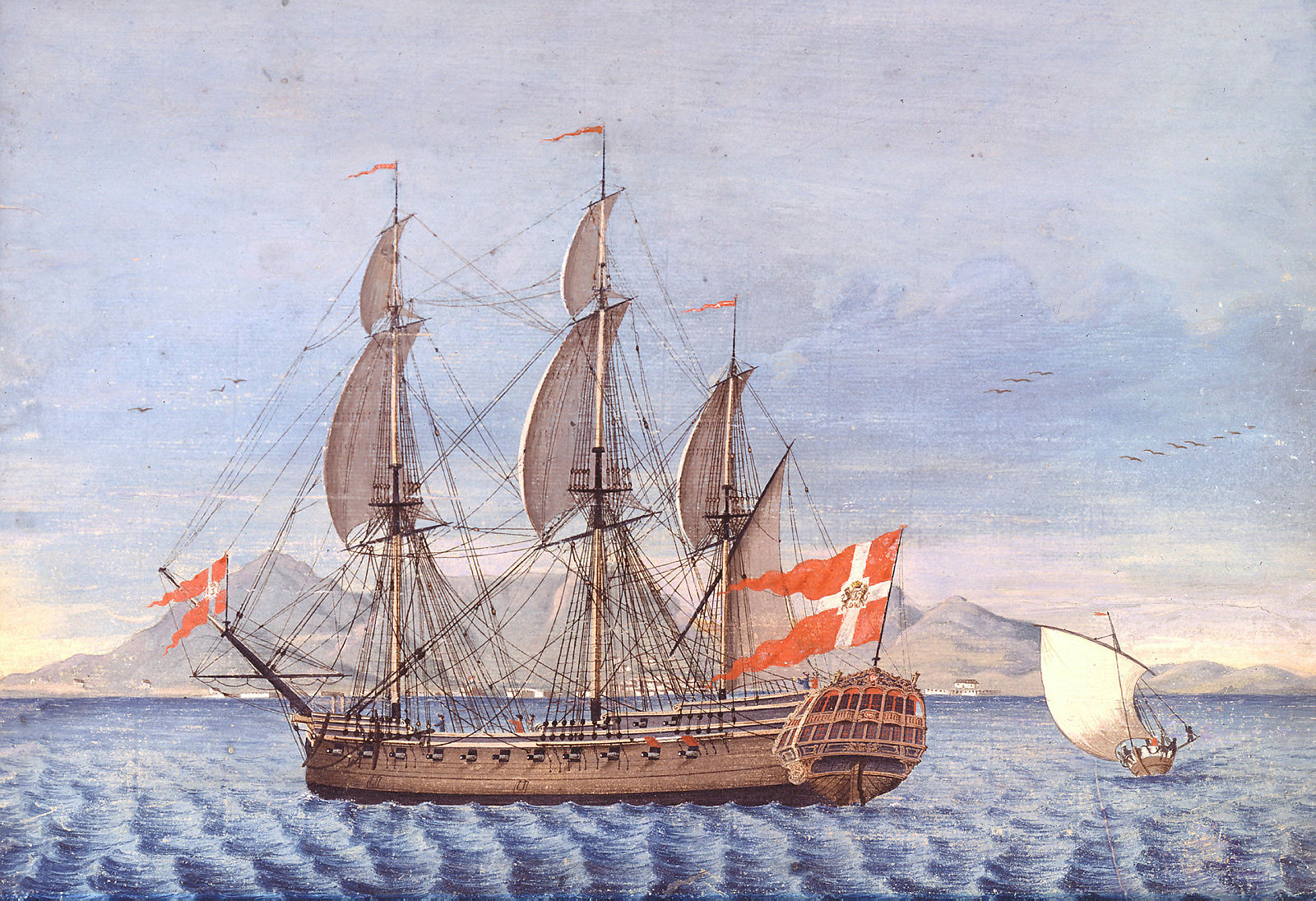
Dronning Sophia Magdalena, a Danish Asiatic Company Chinaman

A Chinaman (Danish: Kinafarerne) was a ship engaged in trade between Europe - particularly Denmark, Norway, and Sweden - and China, in the 18th and 19th centuries, by analogy with East Indiaman. The companies using these ships included the Danish Asiatic Company and Swedish East India Company.

== Route ==
The trade route from Europe to Canton, China, was 18 months to complete, arriving back in Europe in July or August. The route from Scandinavia generally went north of the British Isles and not through the English Channel, due to favourable winds. Ships would stop for supplies variously at Madeira, Cape Verde, Rio de Janeiro, or Cape Town. Danish ships seldom stopped at any Asian ports on their way to Canton, only stopping in the Sunda Strait for provisions, though some ships stopped at Tranquebar, then a Danish possession. From Canton to Europe, ships returned directly to Denmark without stops. Colonial goods that were bought in China included tea, porcelain, and silk.

== Ships ==
Chinamen were larger than normal merchant ships, owing to the longer voyages the ships needed to reach China, as opposed to India. Between 1732 and 1807, the Danish Asiatic Company utilised 125 Chinamen. Danish Chinamen were most often built at Christianshavn, such as the Kronprinsen af Danmark or Dronning Sophia Magdalena, or were former naval ships converted for use by the Danish Asiatic Company, such as the Cron Printz Christian which was a former frigate of the Royal Swedish Navy.

== See also ==
- Chinaman (term)
- Old China Trade, trade between China and the United States
- Guineaman, a ship used to transport slaves from the region of Guinea
- East Indiaman, a ship used to transport colonial goods from the East Indies and the Indian subcontinent
- West Indiaman, a ship used to transport colonial goods from the West Indies
