= NIMBI GameLab =

Agency overview
- Formed: August 2024
- Jurisdiction: Government of Denmark
- Headquarters: Knabrostræde 3, Copenhagen
- Employees: 8
- Annual budget: 10.4 m DKK (2026)
- Parent department: Ministry of Culture
- Website: https://www.nimbi.dk/

NIMBI Game Lab is a Danish government agency responsible for supporting the development and knowledge of original Danish video games and game culture, as well as activities to promote the Danish video game industry. Established in 2024 as part of the Ministry of Culture, it is the first agency of its kind in Europe.

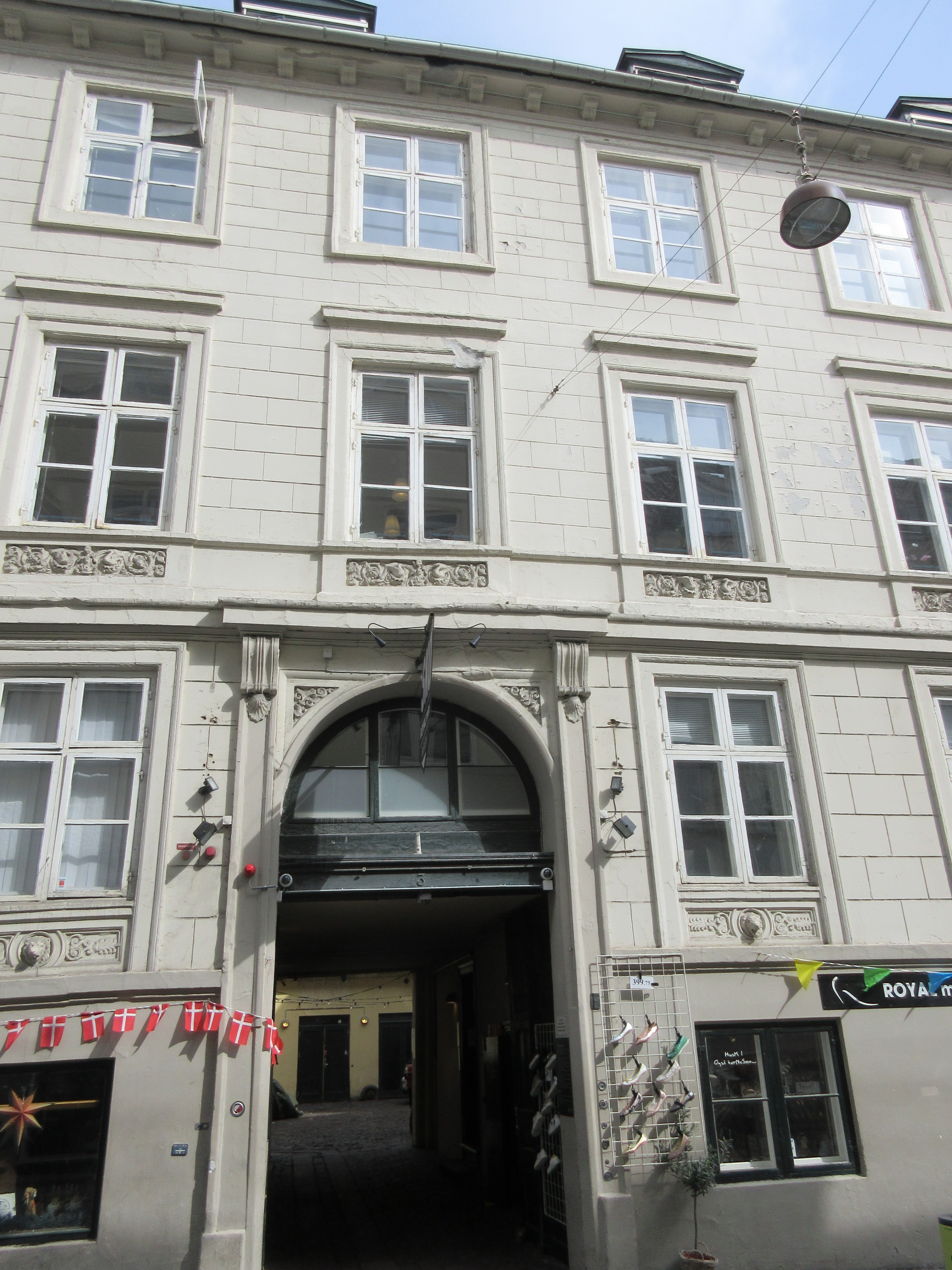
Knabrostræde 3, where the headquarters of NIMBI are located

The headquarters of NIMBI Game Lab are located in Knabrostræde 3 in Copenhagen. The organisation currently employs 8 people, with Jan Neiiendam as its CEO.

== History ==
=== Background ===
The Danish Film Institute (DFI) first initiated support of Danish game development through their Talent Development Scheme (Danish: Talentudviklingsordningen), described in their 4-year political outline for the development of the Danish film and TV industry. The political agreement was placed under the Danish Ministry of Culture. From the 153 million Danish Kroner reserved for the overall scheme, a sum of 12 million DKK was allocated for talent development within games.

In October 2010, the DFI evaluated the scheme, specifically in relation to game development, and recommended that the support for games be moved into its own separate Development Support Scheme (Danish: Udviklingsstøtteordning), and that the allocated support be increased to 16 million DKK. The next political agreement for film between 2011–2014 outlined a separate Game Funding Scheme (Danish: Spilordningen) and was allocated 20 million DKK, out of 2.1 billion DKK.

From 2007–2018, the financial support for Danish game development was increased and framed as part of a broader focus on games as an emerging, but strong cultural media, permeating much of the general population's consumption. Concurrently, schools like DADIU, The Animation Workshop in Viborg, and the IT University of Copenhagen were offering more game development related courses, strengthening the importance of supporting Danish game development and talent. In the same time period, public-industrial initiatives like Computerspilzonen (2007–2010) and Interactive Denmark (2010–2016) worked on creating more jobs and improving the structural working conditions of the industry, marking an increased and serious interest in games. From 2017, the DFI expanded their support for the industry with the Game Promotion Scheme (Danish: Spilfremme).

With the stagnation of the cultural support for the Danish game developers, criticism from the industry followed that while the influence and economic importance of games as a global cultural product soared, the cultural support did not match this movement. The conditions outlined in the agreements between 2015 and 2023 did also not change, with only about ten lines of text describing the framework for the support, in comparison to the remaining eight pages for film and TV development.

Political agreement outline	Schemes	Million DKK, per 4-year period
DFI: Filmaftale 2007–2011	Talentudviklingsordningen	12
DFI: Filmaftale 2011–2014	Udviklingsstøtteordning	20
DFI: Filmaftale 2015–2018	Spilordningen	40
DFI: Filmaftale 2019–2023	Spilordningen	40
NIMBI GameLab 2023–2027	Spilordningen / Spilfremme	33.8

=== Establishment of NIMBI ===
NIMBI GameLab was favorably received by both the game industry and related institutions. The industry organisation for film and TV, Producentforeningen, which has previously worked with DFI on Danish game industry reports and events, underlined the importance of the establishment of the institution:

"An institute for game development will contribute to ensuring that the industry receives the necessary help and support to realize its great untapped potential through support for both artistic and commercial games, promotion of Danish games, export advancement, and talent development." - Charlotte Enevoldsen, tidligere Vicedirektør for Producentforeningen.

(Danish: "Et institut for spiludvikling vil bidrage til, at branchen får den nødvendige hjælp og støtte til at udfolde sit store uudnyttede potentiale gennem støtte til både kunstneriske og kommercielle spil, promovering af danske spil, eksportfremme og talentudvikling." - Charlotte Enevoldsen, former VP of Producentforeningen.)

Danish Minister of Culture, Jakob Engel-Schmidt, who played a pivotal role in the establishment of the institute, highlighted both the cultural and economic value that digital games have for Denmark, but also the value of such an institute for parents, who can easily identify Danish games as an alternative for their kids. New reports from The Media Council for Children and Young People (Danish: Medierådet for Børn og Unge) indicates that while a lot of children between 9-15 years old are gaming, only 2% of their games are of Danish origin.

== Activities ==
NIMBI is active within two main areas of game development and activities promoting the Danish game industry: The Game Funding Scheme (Danish: Spilordningen), and The Game Promotion Scheme (Danish: Spilfremme). NIMBI allocates DKK 15 million in funding for Danish digital games each year. The funding is focused on the development, production and release of original Danish games. The funding is allocated based on cultural value, originality, implementation, and responsibility.

The Game Promotion Scheme supports initiatives that improve professional standards in the Danish games industry and increase awareness, accessibility and engagement with Danish digital games. Examples of these activities include the organization of courses and seminars, publications and knowledge-sharing, travels to conferences and award shows, as well as participation in delegations.

NIMBI GameLab's purpose is described in the Law on NIMBI GameLab, and outlines seven areas of focus:

1. Grants: Providing grants for the development, production and launch of Danish digital games, with a focus on digital games with artistic and cultural qualities.
2. Knowledge: Supporting the promotion and spread awareness of Danish digital games in Denmark and internationally.
3. Talent Development: Supporting talent development related to Danish digital games through e.g. educational and industry partnerships.
4. Knowledge Creation and Overview: Creating knowledge and overview through data collection and analysis about Danish digital games and the state of the games industry.
5. Promotion: Disseminateing knowledge about Danish digital games to the public in an accessible and relevant way.
6. Dialogue with the Industry: Ensuring an ongoing dialog with the games industry and key user groups about the institute's activities.
7. Children and Youth: Supporting children and young people's access to Danish digital games based on Danish culture and Danish values.

== Supported Games ==
A list of games that has received funding from the Game Funding Scheme under DFI from 2011–2024 can be found on DFI's website. It is also possible to find a list of activities that received funding through the Game Promotion Scheme.

From 2025, all games and activities receiving funding from NIMBI GameLab can be found through NIMBI's website.

== Organisational structure ==
NIMBI GameLab is governed by a board, consisting of:

- Kasper Kruse (Chairman of the Board and Head of The Animation Workshop)
- Trine Laier (Member of the Board & founder of Those Eyes)
- Mathias Gredal Nørvig (Member of the Board & CEO of SYBO Games)
- Sofie Filt Læntver (Member of the Board & founder of 1010)
- Christian Walther Øyrabø (Member of the Board & CEO of OOONO)
