= Gammel Strand 46 =

Æosted building in Copenhagen

The Journalists' House
- Journalisternes Hus
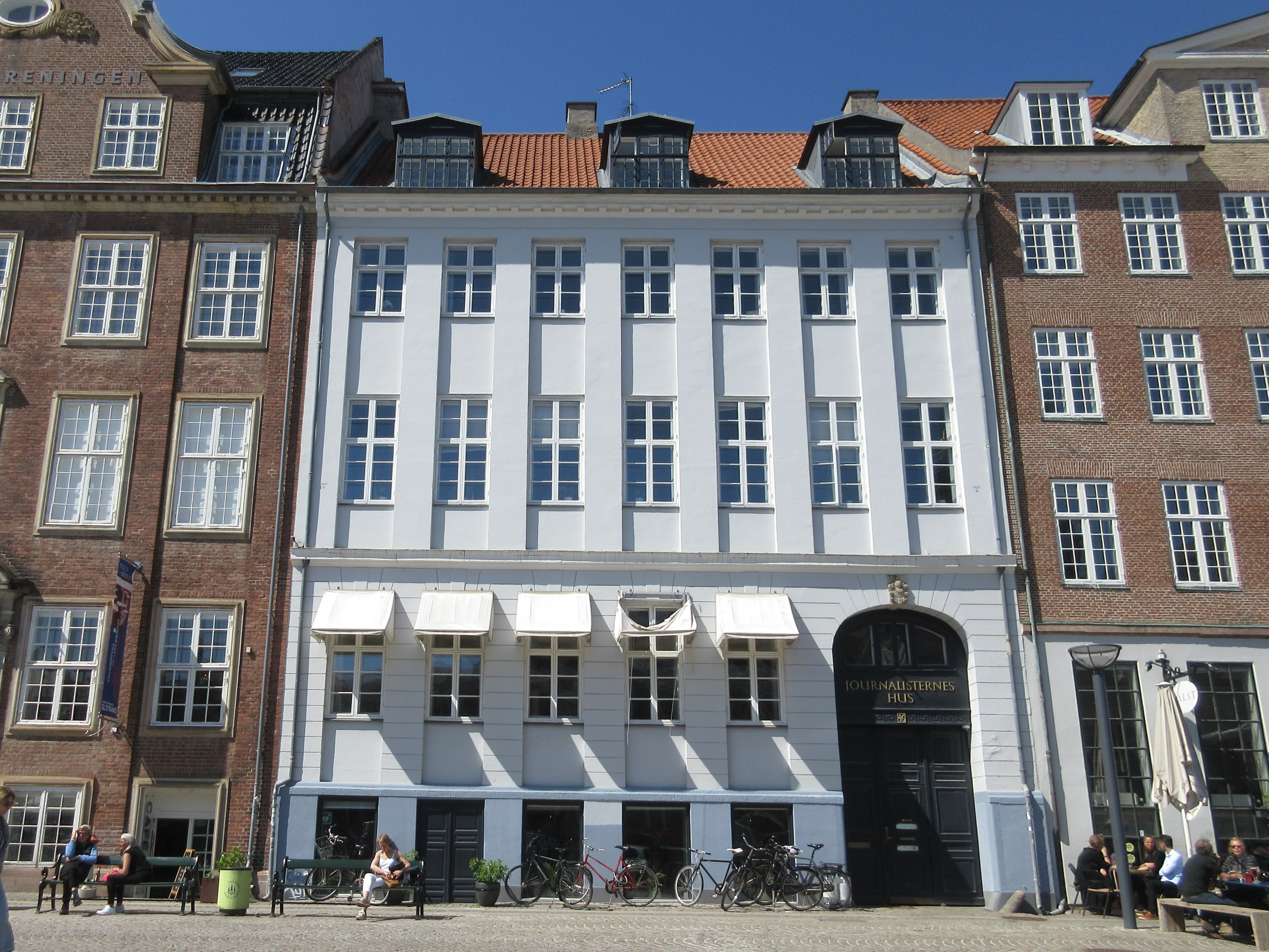
- Interactive map of the The Journalists' House area

General information
- Location: Copenhagen, Denmark
- Coordinates: 55°40′39.4″N 12°34′40.26″E
- Completed: 1808
- Renovated: c. 1850, 1963

The Journalists' House (Danish: Journalisternes Hus), situated at Gammel Strand 46, opposite Thorvaldsens Museum and Christiansborg Chapel, is the Danish Union of Journalists' headquarters in Copenhagen, Denmark. The Neoclassical building was constructed by Andreas Hallander as part of the rebuilding of the city following the Copenhagen Fire of 1795, incorporating elements from the previous building on the site. It was listed in the Danish registry of protected buildings and places in 1918. Notable former residents include the clergy Christian Bastholm, poet and translator Ditlevine Feddersen, agriculturalist Oluf Christian Olufsen, naval officers Peter Norden Sølling and Carl Irminger, opera director and choir conductor Giuseppe Siboni, court physician Joachim Lund Drejer, ballet master August Bournonville, schoolmistress Natalie Zahle and church historian Carl Joakim Brandt.

== History ==
=== 18th century ===
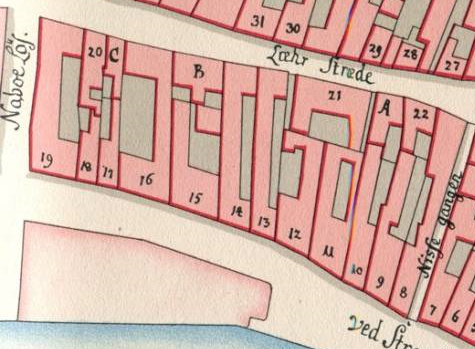
No. 15 seen on a detail from Christian Gedde's map of Strand Quarter, 1756.

The property was listed in Copenhagen's first cadastre of 1689 as No. 15 in Strand Quarter, owned by councilman Peter Motzfeldt. His property continued all the way to Læderstræde on the other side of the block. The property was destroyed in the Copenhagen Fire of 1728, together with most of the other buildings in the area. A new building on the site was constructed for royal chamber secretary and chamber treasurer Georg Christians Jacobi (1694–1757) in 1732–33. The property was again listed as No. 15 in the new cadastre of 1756 and was owned by the crown at that time. The part of the property that fronted Læderstræde (now Læderstræde 13) had been sold off to Christian Berg. It was marked as No. 15 B on Christian Gedde's 1757 map of Strand Quarter.

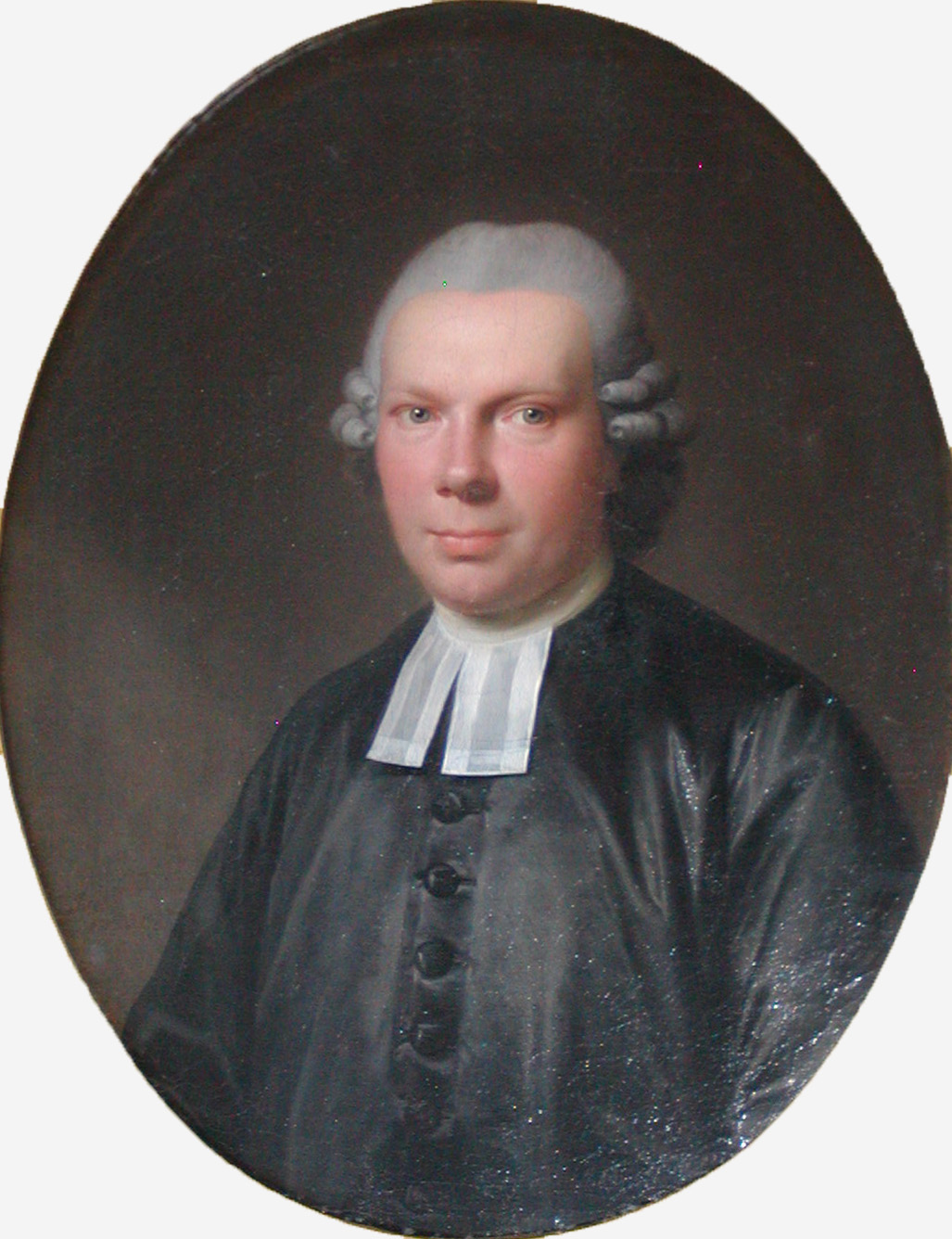
Christian Bastholm

The property was home to just 12 residents in three households at the time of the 1787 census. Christian Bastholm, Chaplain-in-Ordinary to the king, resided in the building with two of his children (aged 13 and 15), a housekeeper, two maids and one male servant. Jochum Rubarth, a tailor, resided in the building with his 10-year-old daughter and one maid. Maria Linck, a widow junk dealer, resided in the building with her 35-year-old son Johan Peter Linck.

The building was destroyed in the Copenhagen Fire of 1795. The fire came from the east and stopped just a few houses further down the waterfront at Naboløs. The present building on the site was constructed in 1797 by Andreas Hallander for Kathrine Marie Clausen, widow of clockmaker Oluf Lyngager. Her late husband had served as alderman of the Clockmakers' Guild from 15 October 1770 to15 October 1787.

=== 19th century ===
At the time of the 1801 census, No. 15 was home to 44 residents in six households. Johan Henrich Hovitz (1763–1806), a businessman (stadsmægler), resided in the building with his wife Øhlegaard Christiana (née Kreutzfeldt. 1878–), their seven children (aged three to 14), another four-year-old child in their care, an office clerk, a caretaker, a housekeeper and three maids. Ditlevine Feddersen, a poet and translator from Norway, resided in the building with her son Peter Feddersen (1750–1822), a housekeeper, a maid and a male servant. Mads Friderich Huulevad, a bookkeeper, resided in the building with his wife Margrethe Elisabeth Aarestrup, their three children (aged two to nine) and one maid. Søren Nielsen, a workman, resided in the building with his wife Birgitte Christine Nielsdatter, their one-year-old son and one maid. Rasmus Lange, a tailor), resided in the building with his wife Rebecke (née Tommerup), their five children (aged six to 21), four tailor's apprentices (aged 11 to 17), one maid and bookkeeper Christian Riissing. Ludvig Brorsen, a clockmaker, resided in the building with his wife Cathrine Ulriche Gold, their son Sigvart Christopher Brorsen and one maid.

The property was listed in the new cadastre of 1806 as No. 13 in Strand Quarter. It was at that time owned by merchant (urtekræmmer) Nicolai Jacob Grave, He was also the owner of the nearby property at No. 21 (now Læderstræde 11) and did therefore not himself live in the building. He had prior to purchasing the building in Læderstræde resided at Vandkunsten No. 261 in the city's West Quarter (now Løngangsstræde 15). His first wife Dorothea née Buch had died in 1803. He had subsequently married Anna Maria Groth. on 7 August 1804.

Oluf Christian Olufsen (1764–1827), a professor of economy, was among the residents of the building in 1819. Peter Norden Sølling (1758–1827), a naval officer and the founder of Bombebøssen, was a resident of the building from 1822 to 1825. Giuseppe Siboni (1780–1839), an opera director and choir conductor, was among the residents in 1829–30.

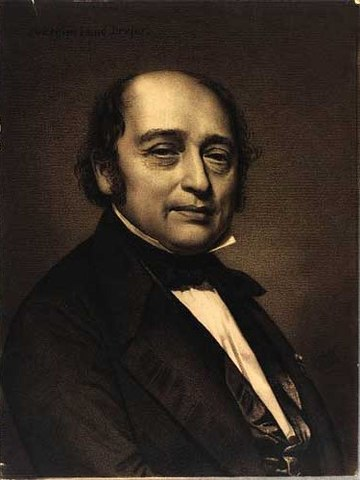
Joachim Lund Drejer

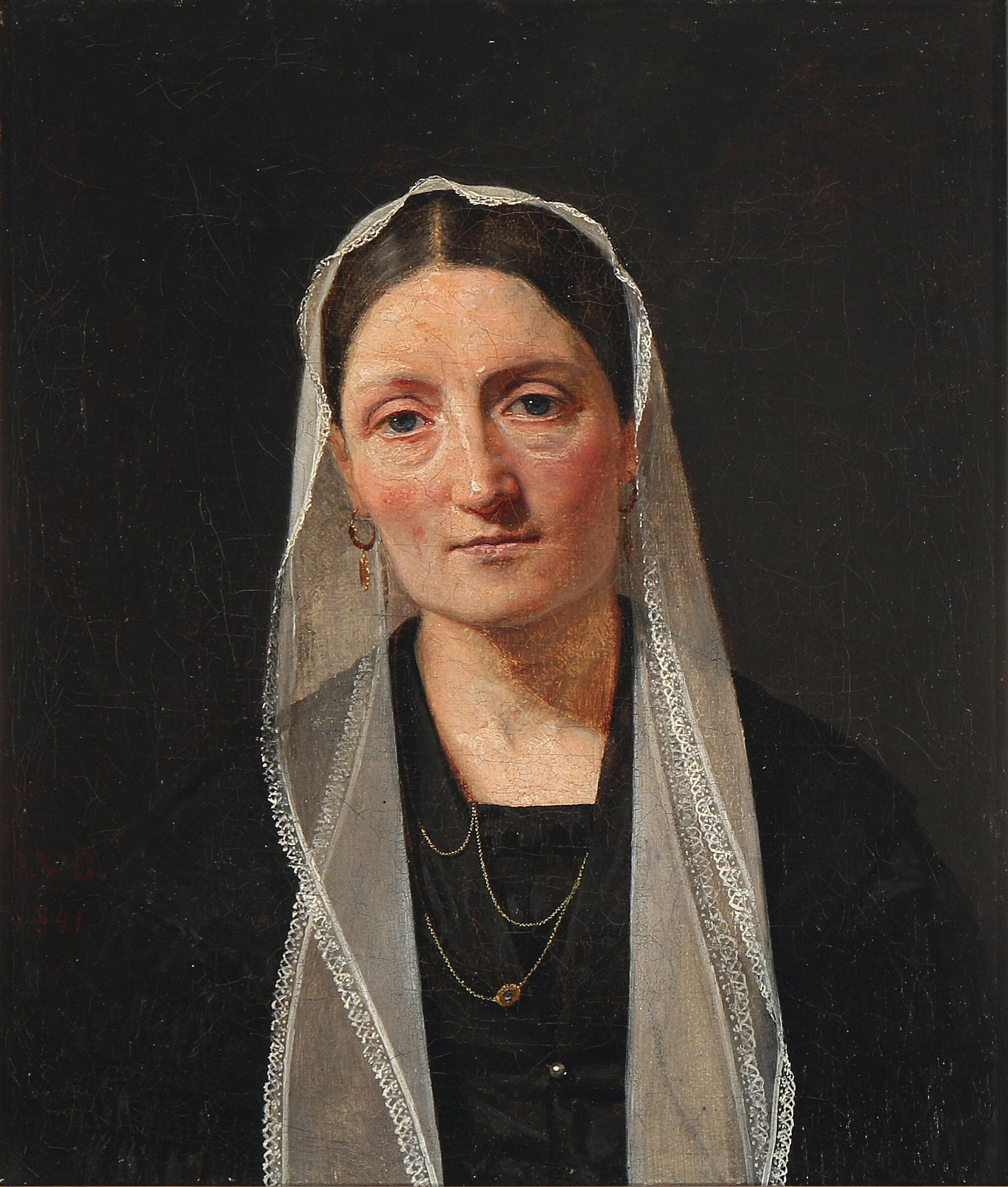
Henriette Conradine Drejer

At the time of the 1840 census, No. 13 was home to 23 residents in four households. Joachim Lund Drejer (1792–1853), a court physician and professor, resided on the ground floor with his wife Henriette C. Dreier (née Løffler, 1802–1879), their four children (aged five to 10), his 22-year-old sister Eline S. C. Dreier, three maids and one lodger (instrumentmaker). Andreas Christian Gierlew (1774–1845), a royal consul-general in Norway, was temporarily occupying the first floor apartment with the student Arthur Eugeb Nicolai Gierlew and two servants. Georg Hermann Richter, a high-ranking civil servant, resided on the second floor with his sister Anine Wilhelmine Rimestad, her four children (aged 10 to 24) and one maid. Dorothea Amalia (néeBresløvs), a flour retailer (widow), resided in the basement with her son Wilhelm Sybye, clockmaker).

August Bournonville (1805–1879), ballet master at the Royal Danish Ballet, was a resident of the building in 1841.

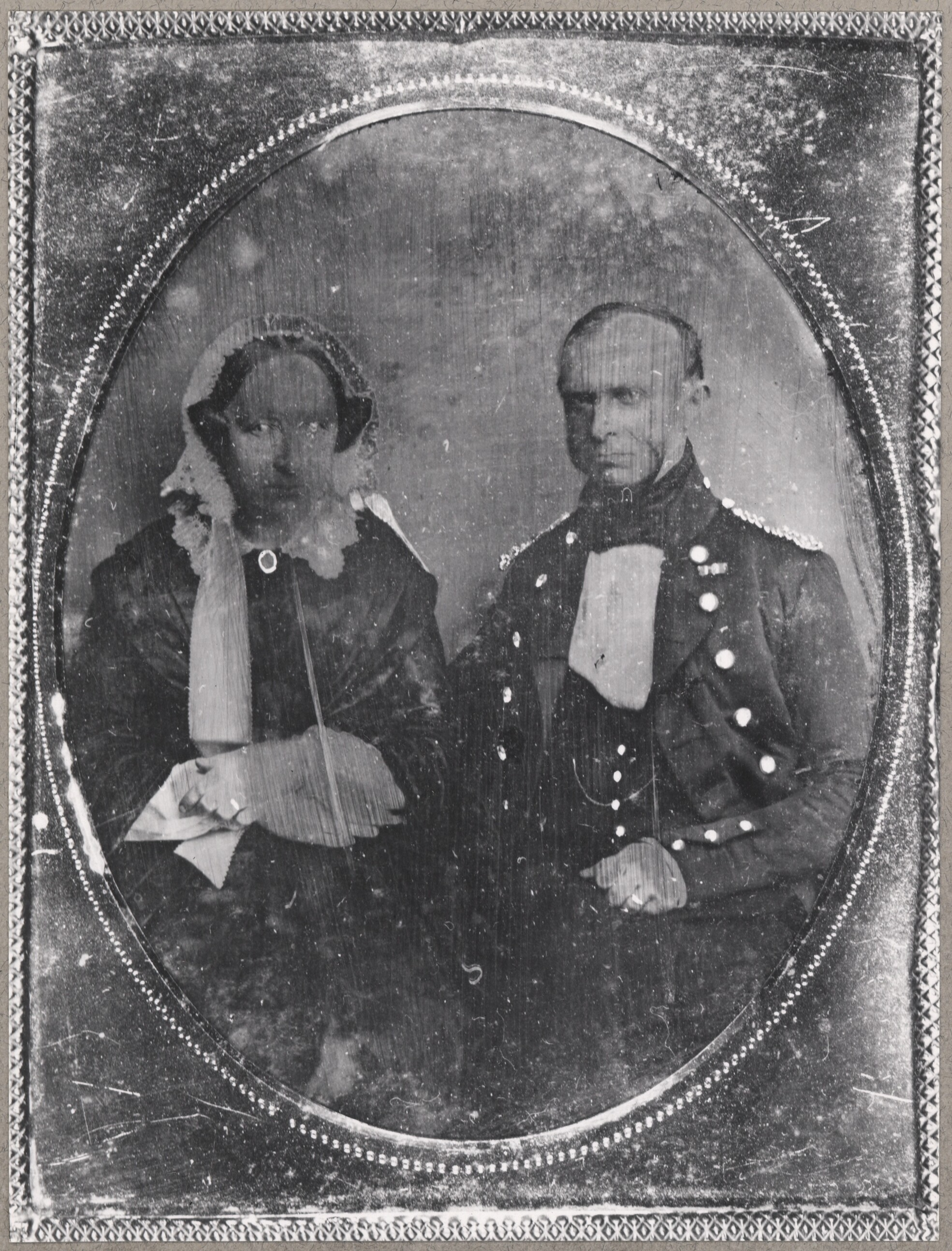
Carl and Henriette Irminger, 1857.

At the time of the 1845 census, No. 13 was home to 20 residents in four households. The Drejer family was still resident on the ground floor of the building. Carl Irminger, a captain lieutenant in the Royal Danish Navy, resided on the first floor with his wife Henriette Georgine (née Viborg), their three children (aged five to nine), one male servant and two maids. Michael Henriques (1793—1854). a businessman (vekselmægler) resided on the second floor with his wife Emilie (née von Halle, 1803–1891), their two children (aged 14 and 16), a male servant and a maid. Ludevig Ernst Born, a flour merchant, resided in the basement with his wife Marie Elise (née Orthmann), their one-year-old daughter and one maid.

At the time of the 1850 census, No. 13 was home to 31 residents in four households. Joachim and Henritte Conradine Dreier resided on the ground floor with their three children (aged 14 to 22), his sister Frederikke Hornemann Dreier, his sister-in-law Marie Sophie Løffler, a maid, and a coachman. Carl and Henriette Georgine Irminger still resided on the first floor with their five children (aged two to 15), a male servant, a wet nurse and a maid. Michael Henriquis, a vagtmægler and captain in the Infantry Brigade, resided on the second floor with his wife Emilie Henriques (née von Halle), their sons Wilhelm Morits Henriques and Ludvig Emil Henriquis and one maid. Lars Peter Lund, a flour merchant (former clothing manufacturer), resided in the basement with his wife Hansine Conradine Emilie Schougaard, their three children (aged one to seven), one male servant and one maid.

At the time of the 1860 census, No. 13 was home to 23 residents in three households in the front wing. Emma Cecilie Marie Tryde (née Strunck), a widow merchant (urtekræmmer), resided on the ground floor with her four children (aged 14 to 28), two floor clerks, a female cook and a maid. Ernst Kolthoff (1809–1890), pastor at the Church of the Holy Ghost, resided on the first floor with his wife Johanne Marie Kolthoff (née Svane, 1816–1885), their five children (aged seven to 17) and two maids. Hans Peter Rothe, a Royal Danish Navy captain and vice director of the Nautical Charts Archives, resided on the second floor with his wife Thora (née Rohte), one male servant, one maid and the lodger Sofus Magdalin Høgsbro. The latter was headmaster of Røddinge Høhskole and a member of the Folketing. Frederik August Vilhelm Leonardt Ludvig, a glass manufacturer, resided on the ground floor of the rear wing. Mari Christensen, a clothing retailer, was also residing on the ground floor of the rear wing with her nine-year-old daughter. Natalie Zahle, whose girls' school was based at Gammel Strand 48 (from 1867 to 1877), occupied the three upper floors of the rear wing. She lived there with her housekeeper Hanne Christophine Jacobsen, inspector Camilla Augusta Pedersen, teacher Hansine Gerdtzen (1838–1910), 12 students (aged 14 to 24) and three maids. Peder Luding Thrane, a wood retailer, resided in the basement of the rear wing with his wife Regine Wilhelmine Thrane (née Olsen), their three children (aged seven to 13) and one maid. Carl Joakim Brandt (1817–1889), a church historian, resided on the ground floor in the years around 1875.

The property was home to 21 residents at the 1880 census. Erasmine Caroliane Petrine Marie Elisabeth Michelsen, the owner of the property, resided on the first floor with the husjomfru Wilhelminne Nikoline Nielsen. Edvard Christian Sonne, a wholesale merchant, resided on the second floor with his wife Hansine Cæcilie Sonne, their two children (aged one and two) and two maids. Christoffer Wilhelm Frederik Bestle, a wine merchant, resided on the third floor with his wife Trine Marie Bertle, their two sons (aged 22 and 24), a wine merchant (employee), two male servants and a maid. Carl Emil Fase, a hairdresser, resided on the fourth floor with his wife Anne Sophie Fase, an 11-year-old daughter from the wife's first marriage, a maid, and a hairdresser (employee).

=== 20th century ===
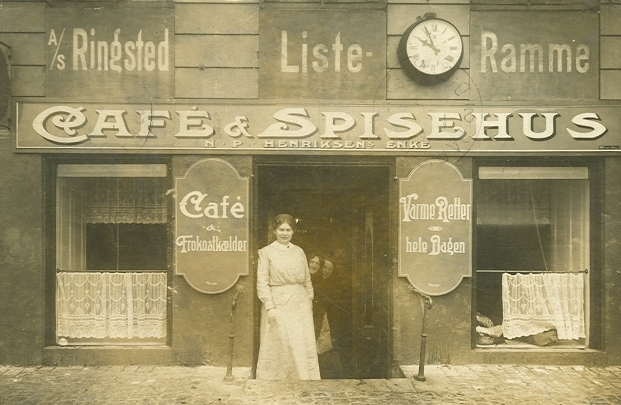
The restaurant in around 1900.

A restaurant was around the turn of the century situated on the ground floor of the building. Clara Pontoppidan (1883–1975), an actress, resided in the building from 1 November 1903 until 1 May 1904.

Berkel A/S, a subsidiary of a Dutch company, purchased the property in the first half of the century. In 1972, Berkel sold the property to the Danish Union of Journalists for DKK 800,000. The union's journal Journalisten was also based in the building. In 2016, it relocated to new premises at Gammel Strand 34.

== Architecture ==
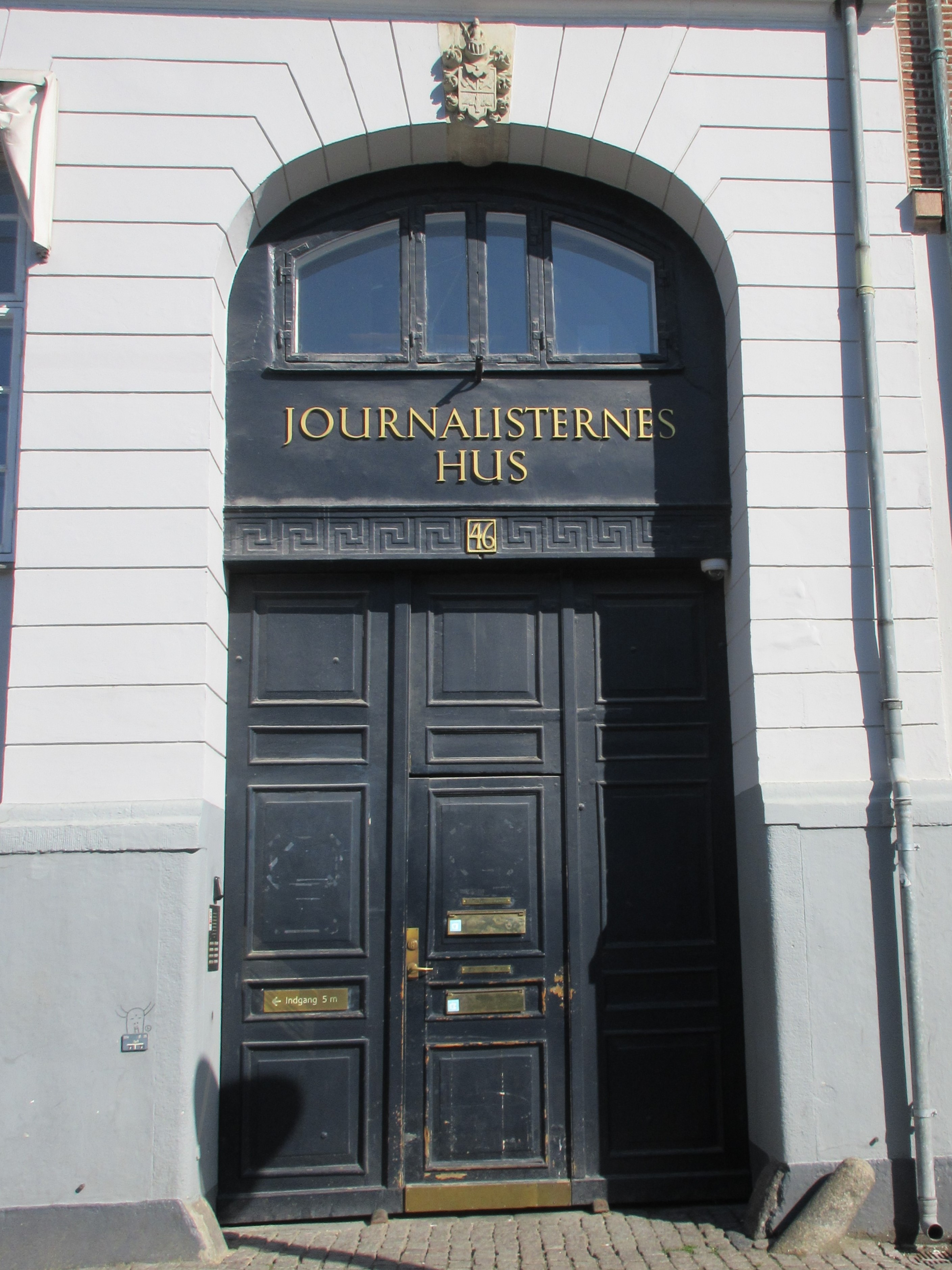
The gate.

Gammel Strand 35 is constructed with three storeys over a walk-out basement. The seven-bays-wide facade is decorated with lesenes between the windows, a belt course above the ground floor and a modillioned cornice.. The lesenes were originally fluted and there were rosettes below the windows but these decorative elements were removed in around 1850. The ground floor of the facade is finished with shadow joints.A gateway is located in the bay furthest to the right. The keystone above the gate features Jacobi's coat of arms and dates from the 1730s. The basement entrance is located in the second bay from the left. The pitched red tile roof features three dormer windows towards thestreet.

A side wing extends from the rear side of the building along the western side of a central courtyard. The side wing is at the other end attached to a five-bay former warehouse.The side wing and former warehouse are both topped by monopitched red tile roofs. The facade of the warehouse is crowned by a wall dormer but the original pulley beam has been removed. The yardside of the complex is rendered yellow.

== Today ==
The Danish Union of Journalists is based in the building. In January 2018, it was announced that the Danish Union of Journalists intended to sell the property and relocate to larger premises elsewhere in the city. The plans were given up in 2018. Some of the union's activities were instead moved to rented premises at Gammel Strand 50. The plans were later revived. In August 2025, Gammel Strand 46 was sold for DKK 60 mio. to Copenhagen Capital. The Danish Union Copenhagen's of Journalists will remain anchor tenant in the building until their new headquarters in Southern Docklands have been completed in authumn 2026.
