= Gråbrødretorv 6 =

Historical building in Copenhagen, Denmark

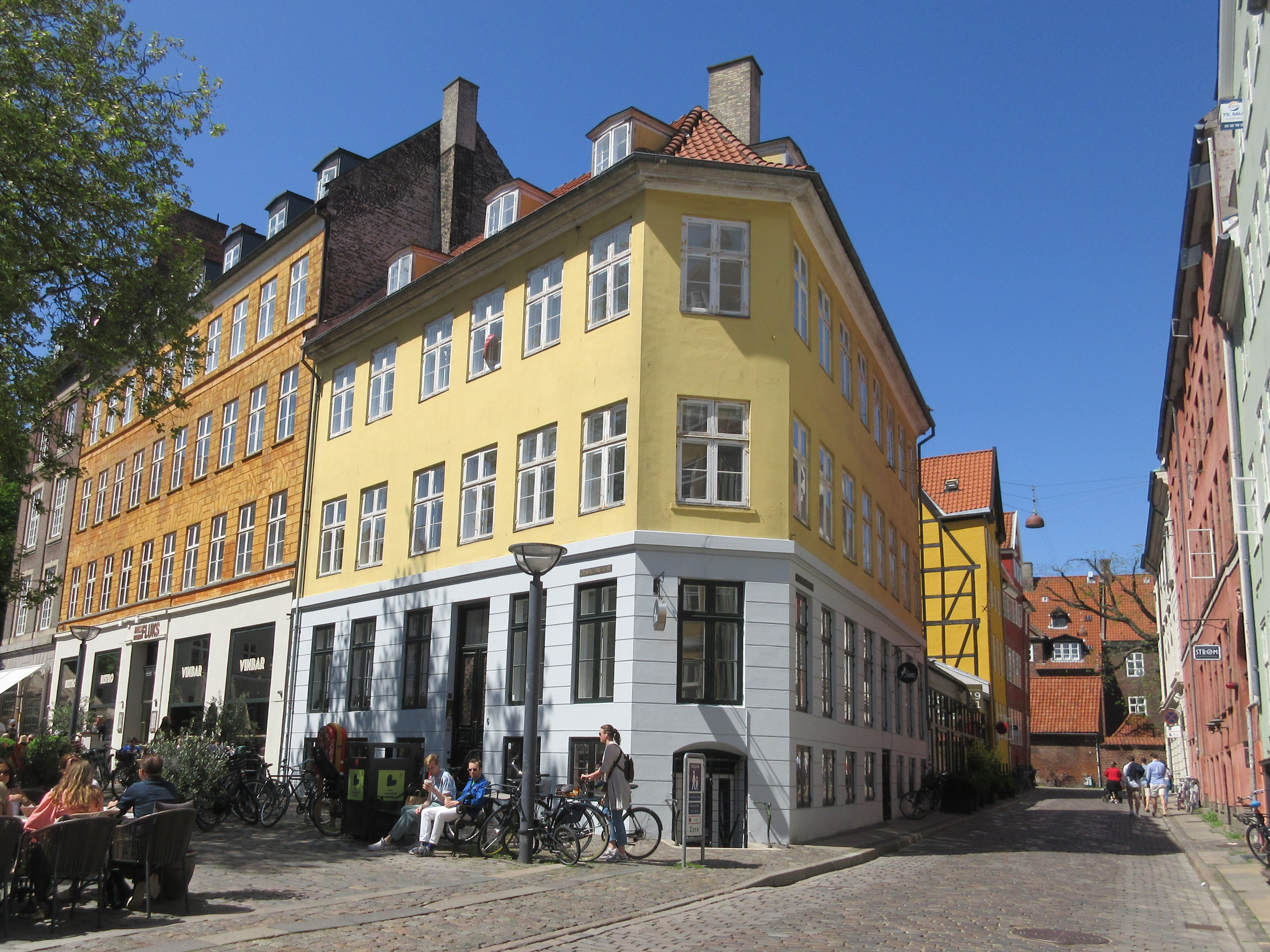
- Interactive map of the Gråbrødretorv 6 area

General information
- Location: Copenhagen, Denmark
- Coordinates: 55°40′48.36″N 12°34′33.92″E
- Completed: 1818; 208 years ago
- Renovated: 1881; 145 years ago

Gråbrødretorv 6 is a building at the corner of Gråbrødretorv and Niels Hemmingsens Gade in the Old Town of Copenhagen, Denmark. The oldest parts of the building date from the 1730s but it owes its current appearance to a reconstruction in 1818 and an adaptation undertaken by Valdemar Ingemann in 1881. It was listed in the Danish registry of protected buildings and places in 1945. Former residents include bishop Hans Lassen Martensen and businessman Jacob Heinrich Moresco.

== History ==
=== 18th century ===
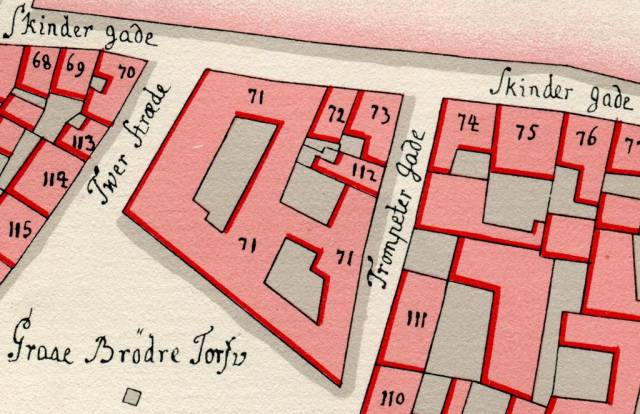
No. 71 seen on a detail from Christian Gedde's map of Frimand's Quarter, 1757.

The entire north side of the square was part of one large property in the late 17th century. In 1689, it was listed as No. 83 in Frimand's Quarter and owned by Ceremonimiester Frederik Gersdorff (1650–1691). Together with most of the other buildings in the area, the property was destroyed in the Copenhagen Fire of 1728. Counter Admiral Peter Hiort constructed a large new townhouse on the site in the early 1730s. It was later acquired by Wilhelm, Count Gyldencrone. The property was listed as No. 71 from 1756. The building comprised a 20-bay-long main wing on Ulfeldts Plads (now Gråbrødretorv) and a two-storey secondary wing on Trompetergangen (now Niels Hemmingsens Gade).

In 1782, Gyldencrone sold the corner of Ulfeldts Plads and Trompetergangen to court plattenslager Peder Jensen. Jensen's property had a four-bay-long façade towards the square and an eight-bay-long façade towards the street. The doorways and other openings between the two properties were bricked up in connection with the sale. In 1795, Jensen bought an additional three bays towards the square and five bays towards the street.

=== 19th century ===
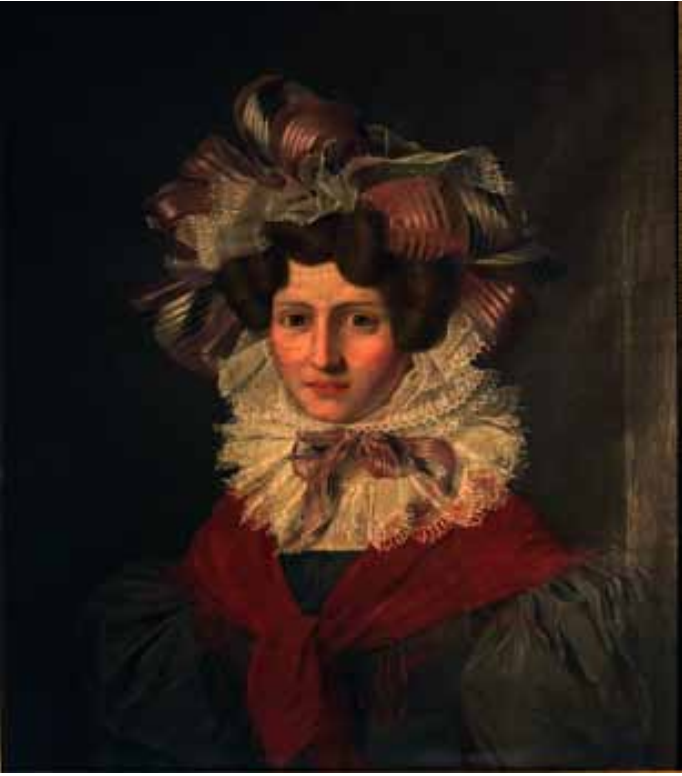
Henriette Axeline Hambro painted by Emil Bærentzen.

The property was listed as No. 114 in the new cadastre of 1806. It was still owned by Jensen at the time.

The building was later acquired by master painter Carl Simon Hambro (1782–1831), younger brother of the successful businessman Joseph Hambro. Naval officer Peter Norden Sølling was a tenant in the building in 1817. His wife died while he lived there. The property was severely damaged by fire in 1817 or 1818. It was subsequently rebuilt with a significantly modified design. In connection with the fire, the property was divided into No. 114A towards the square and No. 114B in Trompetergangen.

Carl Simon Hambro was married to Jeannette Hambro née Nathansen. Their daughter Henriette Axeline (1808–1829) married the wealthy textile merchant Anders Ancker. The couple lived in the Ancker House at Ved Stranden 14. Henriette Axeline died when their son Carl Andreas Ancker (1828–1857) was still an infant and the boy was subsequently brought up by Jeannette Hambro. Carl Andreas Ancker would later create Det Anckerske Legat, a grant for artists. Bishop Hans Lassen Martensen was among the residents of the building from 1835 to 1838.

No. 114 was home to a total of 28 people at the time of the 1840 census. The owners, Jacob Samuel Jacobie and Johanne Jacobie née Israel, a wealthy Jewish couple living on their means, resided with their seven children (aged 4 to 23), a maid and three lodgers on the second floor. Christian Lund, a civil servant, resided on the first floor with his wife Anna Elisabeth Lund née Wedege, their four children and two maids. Peter Frederik Lempfort, an army captain, resided with his wife Margrethe Louise Lempfort née Lütken, their 17-year-old daughter Marie Ottine Frederikke Jacobine Lempfort and a maid on the ground floor. Anders Nielsen, an innkeeper, resided in the basement with his wife Karen Marie Nielsen and a maid.

At the time of the 1845 census, the Jacobie family was still residing in the apartment on the second floor. The only other resident from the 1840 census still living in the building was Peter Frederik Lempfert, now registered as a major in leave (ventepenge), but with no mention of his wife and daughter. Jacobie's other tenants on the other floors were senior clerk in Generalitetet Carl von Holten, and assistant physician Corrielius Kueger with his wife Louise Kuiger née Suenson. The proprietor of the tavern in the basement was now Kresten Chrestensen Kiergegaard. He lived there with his wife Abel Frederikke Wilhelmmine née Købke and a maid.

The property was home to a total of 21 people at the time of the 1860 census. Jacob Samule Jacobsen was still residing on the second floor with his wife Hanna Jacobsen née Israel, three daughters and two maids. Anna Benedicte Stender, a 51-year-old woman, resided with her daughter Emma Hilde Stender and a maid on the first floor. Frederik Christian Frank, a former Royal Sword Master (Kongelig zabelmester), resided in the ground-floor apartment with his wife Johanne Christiane Beckling and a maid. Jens Petersen, an innkeeper, resided with his wife Christine Marie Petersen and their three children (aged two to ten). Anna Margrethe Madsen, a widowed greengrocer, was also residing in the basement with her two daughters (aged one and twelve).

Businessman Jacob Heinrich Moresco resided in the building from 1868. He had spent his childhood at Gråbrødretorv 14. In 1886, he left Gråbrødretorv for a large house in Ordrup.

=== 20th century ===
The property was owned by Bodil Chr. Nielsen, a 60-year-old unmarried woman by 1906. She resided on the second floor with lodgers Ellis Bay and Erik Nissen Wending Kruse. Laura Andrea Dam, a 45-year-old widow employed with needlework, resided on the first floor. Dagmar Chr. Lassen and Johanne M. Syhes, a 39-year-old unmarried woman and a 64-year-old widow, resided in the garret.

== Architecture ==
The building is constructed with three storeys over a walk-out basement. It has a six-bay-long façade on Gråbrødretorv, an eight-bay-long façade on Niels Hemmingsens Gade and a chamfered corner. The ground floor of the plastered façade is finished with shadow joints, painted grey and has green-painted doors and windows. The upper part of the façade, between a white belt course and the white-painted cornice, is rendered yellow with white-painted windows. The pitched roof is clad with red tile.

This design dates mostly from the reconstruction after the fire in 1818. The building was expanded at this point by one storey, the chamfered corner was created and the wing on Niels Hemmingsens Gade was shortened. A gate in the façade on Gråbrødretorv was removed in connection with an adaptation undertaken by Valdemar Ingemann in 1881.

== Today ==
The property was merged with the surrounding properties in 2007. The ground floor is now part of Restaurant Haks Gluks at No. 9. A night club is based in the basement. There is a residential apartment on each of the upper floors.
