= Prinsesse Louise Augusta (1784 DAC ship) =

1783 Danish East Indiaman ship

Prinsesse Louise Augusta (also spelled Prindsesse and Louisa, Lovusa and Lowise) was an East Indiaman of the Danish Asiatic Company, built at Petersværft in 1783. She completed five expeditions to Tranquebar between 1674 and 1684. She wrecked of the Indian in her sixth outbound voyage in 1797.

== Construction and design ==
The Prinsesse Louise August was built at the Petersværft dockyards near Vordingborg. The design and construction was overseen by master shipbuilder Christian Høyer.

== Career ==
1784–1786

The Prinsesse Louise Augusta was captained by Claus Petersen on her first expedition to Tranquebar. Peter Norden Sølling served as chief mate (overstyrmand). Her travel pass (afgangspas was issued in September 1784. She arrived at Tranquebar in June 1795. She departed from Tranquebar in October 1785.

1786–1788

The Prinsesse Louise Augusta was again captained by Claus Petersen on her second expedition to Tranquebar. Her travel pass was issued in September 1786. She arrived at Tranquebar in July 1787. She departed from Tranquebar in October 1787.

1788–1790

The Prinsesse Louise Augusta was captained by Jens Albertsen on her third expedition to Tranquebar. Her travel pass was used in September 1788. She arrived at Tranquebar in July1789. She departed from Tranquebar in November 1789.

1788–1793

The Prinsesse Louise Augusta embarked on her fourth expedition to Tranquebar in 1791. Her travel pass was issued in September 1791. She arrived at Tranquebar in May 1792. She departed from Tranquebar in November 1792.

1794–1795

The Prinsesse Louise Augusta was captained by Carl Schultz (1758–1823) on her fifth expedition to Tranquebar. Her travel pass was issued in Kiæy 1794. She arrived at Tranquebar in January 1795. She departed from Tranquebar in September 1795.

== Fate ==
The Prinsesse Louise Augusta embarked on what would become her last expedition to Tranquebar in 1796.
