= Arveprinsen af Augustenborg (1789 DAC ship) =

Ship built by Asiatic Company

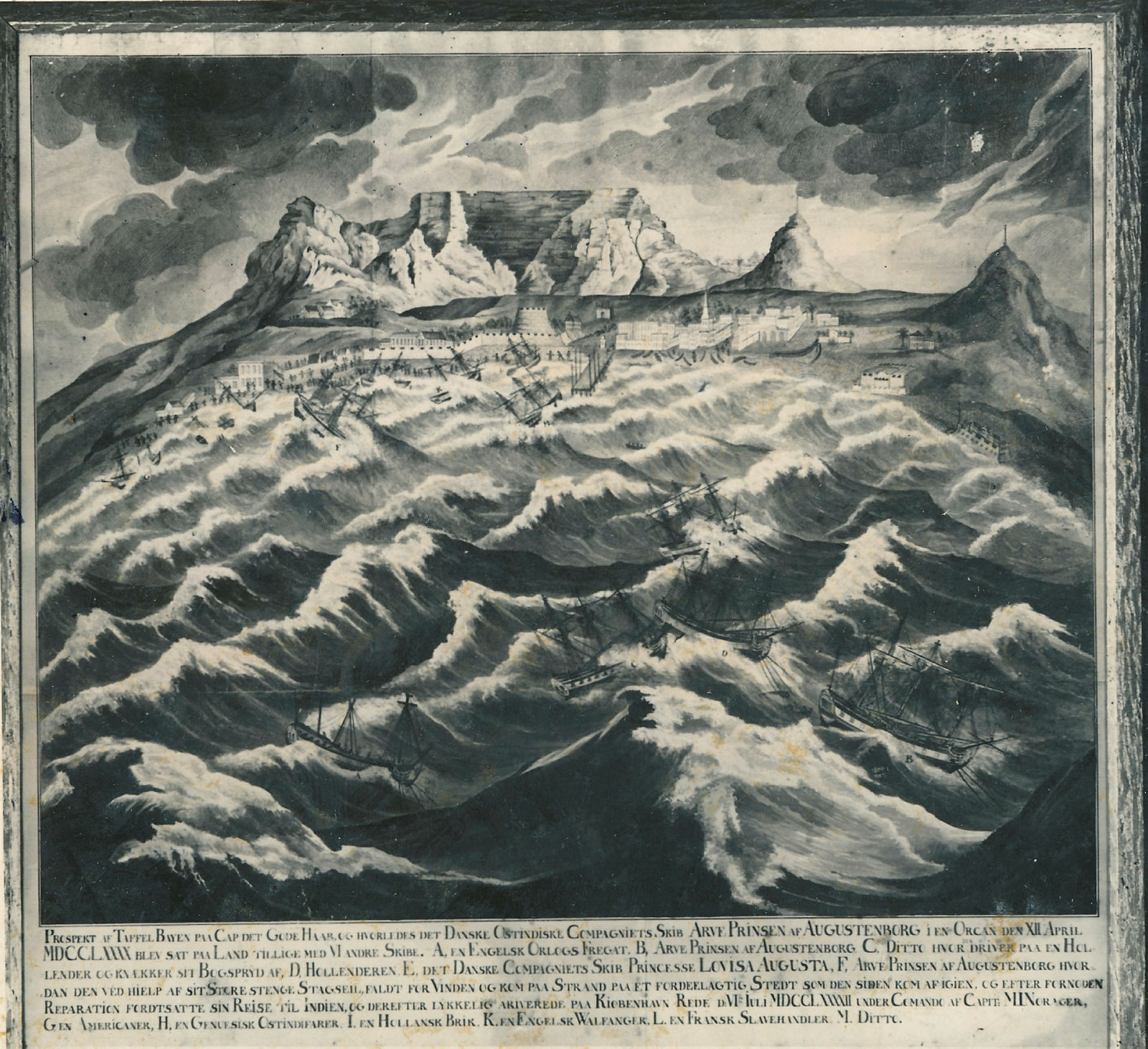
Arveprinsen af Augustenborg caught in a hurricane off the Cape of Good Hope in 1790.

Arveprinsen af Augustenborg, also referred to as Prinsen (Printzen) af Augustenborg 0r Arve-Prindsen, was an East Indiaman of the Danish Asiatic Company, constructed in Copenhagen in 1789. She sailed on eight expeditions to the Danish India between 1789 and 1807. In January 1808, she was confiscated by the British in the Bay of Bengal.

== Construction and design ==
Arveprinsen af Augustenborg was constructed in 1789 by master shipbuilder Eskild Tønsberg. The construction took place either at the DAC's own shipyard at Asiatisk Plads or at nearby Bodenhoffs Plads. Her bilbrev was issued on 21 October 1789.

She was 117 feet long with a beam of 30 feet and a draught of 20 feet.

== DAC service ==
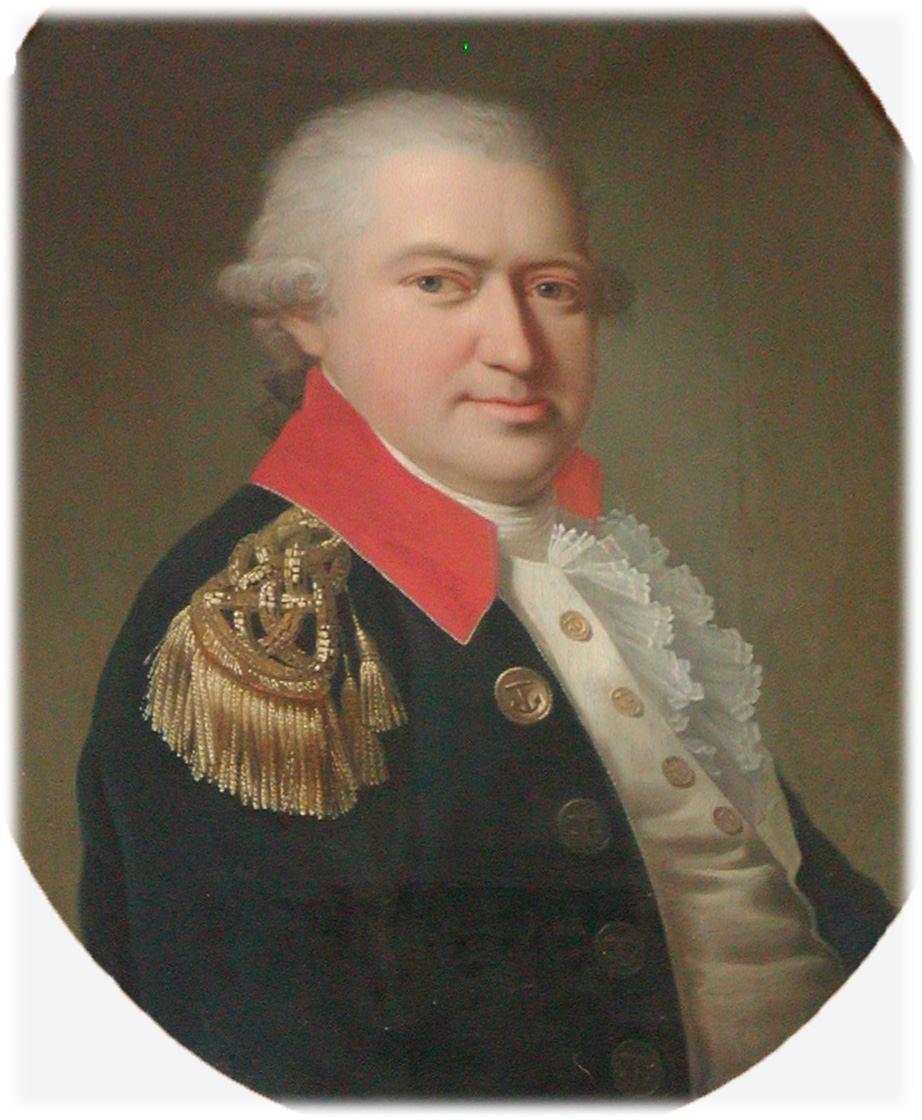
Peter Norden Sølling, captain of Arveprinsen af Augustenborg in 1793-1794.

1789-1792

Arveprinsen af Augustenborg was captained by Moens Jensen Nørager on her first expedition to Danish India in 1789-1792. Her travel pas (afgangsbrev) was issued in November 1790. She departed from Tranquebar in February 1792. The ship's log book (kept by Nørager) covers the period 5 November 1799 – 6 July 1802.

1793-1794

She was captained by Peter Norden Sølling on her second expedition to Danish India in 1793-1794. Her travel pass was issued in April 1793-1794. Jens Koefoed was among the passengers. Former governor Morten Mortensen Færoe returned to Copenhagen onboard the ship in 1724.

She set sails from Serampore in January 1794, bound for Copenhagen. The log book (kept by Sølling) covers the period 17 May 1793 – 25 July 1795.

1795-1796

She sailed on her third expedition to Danish India in 1795-1796. Her travel pass was issued in April 1795. Johan Ludvig Christian Helmich was among the passengers.

In January 1796, she sailed from Serampore to Tranquebar. She set sails from Tranquebar in February, bound for Copenhagen.

1797-1799

She was captained by Jens Holm (1760-1807) on her fourth expedition to Danish India in 1797-1799. Her travel pass was issued in May 1796. She set sails from Serampore in February 1797. The ship's log book (kept by Holm) covers the period 15 May 1797 – 12 May 1799.

1800-1801

She was captained by B. Sebbelowon her fifth expedition to Danish India in 1800-01. The log book (Sebbelowon) covers the period 10 May 1800 – 1801.

1802-1803

She sailed on her sixth expedition to Danish India in 1802-1803. Her travel pass was issued in May 1802. She sailed from Serampore in March 1803, bound for Copenhagen.The log book (28 April 1802 – 6 October 1803) covers the period Peter A. Steen.

1804-1806

She was captained by Jens Holm on her seventh expedition to Danish India in 1804-1806.The log book (30 July 1804 – 29 August 1806) was kept by C. Hauch and not by Hans From as stated on its cover.

1807-1808

She sailed on her last expedition in 1807-1808. Her travel pass was issued in March 1807. The log book (9 March 1807 – 8 June 1808) was kept by A. Løwe.

== Other ships by the same name ==
=== Arveprinsen af Augustenborg (1804–1805) ===
She was followed by two other ships by the same name. The first of these ships subject to major repairs undertaken by Børge Gabriel Lind at Copenhagen in 1804. She embarked on an expedition to either Canton or the East Indies under the command of captain Hans From in 1804. She was severely damaged in a storm on the way back. She was subsequently sold by From on Mauritius (then Isle de France) and replaced by another ship by the same name.

=== Arveprinsen af Augustenborg (1805–1810) ===
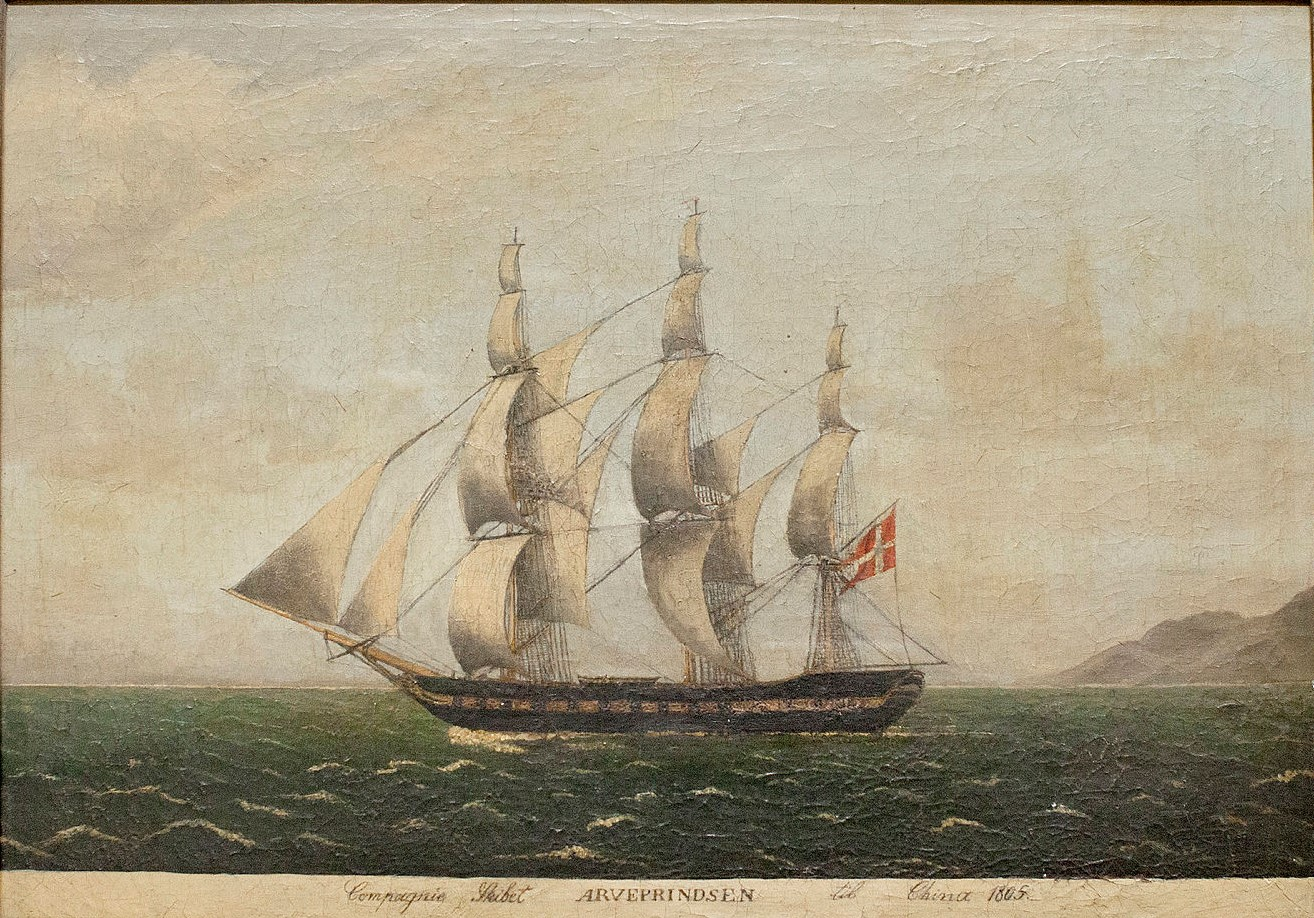
Arveprinsen af Augustenborg in 1805

The new ship was the French prize Hames Sibbold. She was later captured by the British but released with the assistance of Jens Wolff.

From February 1808, she was loaned out to the Royal Dano-Norwegian Navy. Her armament was 22 × 18-pounder guns and 16 × 8-pounder guns. She was captured by the British in 1719 and offered for sale in The Times on 23 April 1823 She was rebuilt and armed in 1825 at Curling, Young & Co shipyard at Limehouse. She was reclassed into corvette in 1828
