= Peter Norden Sølling =

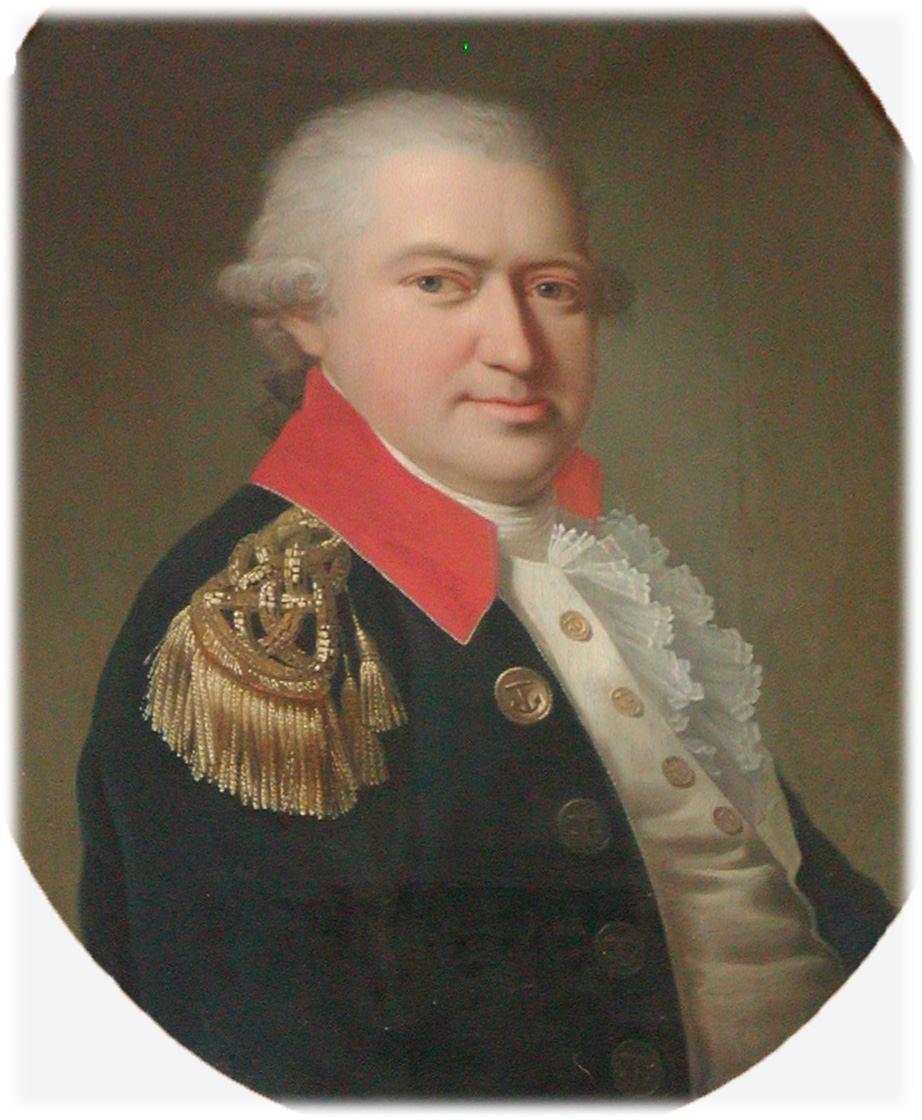
- Born: 13 September 1758; Kristiansand, Norway
- Died: 7 February 1827 (aged 68); Copenhagen, Denmark
- Burial place: Holmens Cemetery, Copenhagen
- Military career
- Allegiance: Denmark–Norway
- Branch: Royal Danish Navy
- Service years: 1771–1827
- Rank: Commodore

Commodore Peter Norden Sølling (13 September 1758 – 7 February 1827) was a Norwegian naval officer and sea captain. He designed and personally led the construction of a type of pilot boats, "Sølling's pilot boats", which gained widespread popularity along the coasts of Norway. He is also remembered for founding Bombebøssen a charity for old seamen in Copenhagen. One of its former buildings. situated at Overgaden Oven Vandet 48 in Christianshavn, features a memorial with a portrait relief of Sølling by Otto Evens.

== Early life ==
Sølling was born on 13 September 1758 in Kristiansand, the son of captain lieutenant Peter Norden Sølling (1718 in Copenhagen – 66) and Anna Cathrine Hortulan (1731 in Nykøbing Sjælland – 85). He was only one year old when his father was sacked as enrollment officer in Kristiansand and the parents moved back to Denmark. In 1764, his mother left the father, settling in Nyborg with the children.

== Career ==
=== Naval career and DAC service ===
Sølling was just 11 years old when he became a cadet in 1771. He was promoted to junior lieutenant in 1876, senior lieutenant in 1783, captain lieutenant in 1789, captain in 1796, commander captain (kommandørkaptajn) in 1804 and finally commodore in 1812. Except for a single naval commission, as second-in-command on the brig Bornholm, he did however spend most of his early career, between 1774 and 1795, in the service of the Danish Asiatic Company. In 1774–76, he was in India and China with a DAC Chinaman. In 1777, he returned to China as helmsman of another DAC Chinaman. In 1781–83, he was in China with the Chinaman Prins Frederik. In 1784 he was in Tranquebar with the frigate Prinsesse Louise Augusta.

On 5 September 1790, he left Copenhagen as captain of the Chinaman Kastellet Dansborg. Sølling sailed from Copenhagen as captain of Arveprinsen af Augustenborg, on 30 May 1793, bound for the Bengal and Tranquebar. He returned to Copenhagen in 1795 and that was his last long voyage.

=== Years in Norway ===
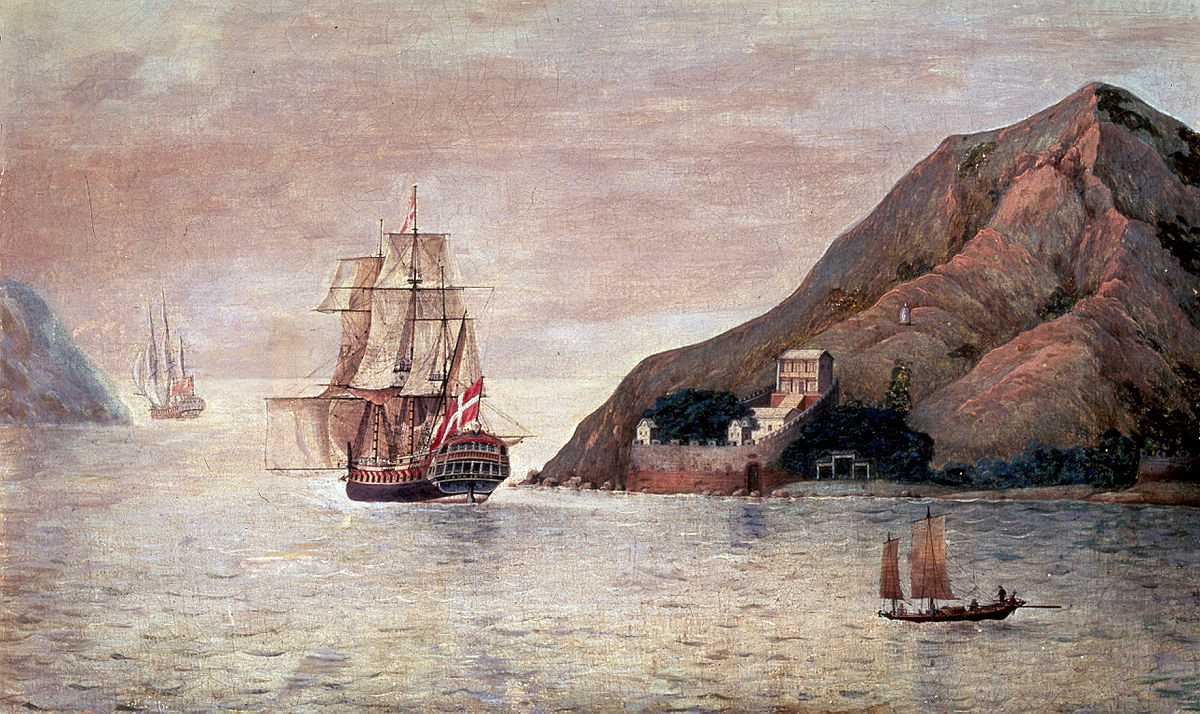
The frigate Henriette passing Bocca Tigris en route to Canton

In 1796, Sølling was sent to France by De Coninck & Co. to buy a frigate, Henriette. which he was supposed later to captain on a voyage to Canton. In the British Channel Henriette was so badly damaged in an incident that he had to call into the River Thames for repairs. While in England, due to illness, he ended up having to stay in the country to recuperate, while someone else took Henriette to Canton. It was a great disappointment, but resulted in an unexpected outcome. Sølling noticed some very navigable "deck boats" (dækbåde) on the Thames, which he found would be very well suited for pilot service along the coasts of Norway, where pilots had so far only used open boats. He bought one of the boats, took it back home with him and put a lot of effort into improving it and adapting it to Norwegian conditions. With assistance from Crown Prince Frederick (VI) and chief pilot Poul Vendelbo Løvenørn he obtained funding for the construction of three boats. By this time, he had introduced so many changes, that the design was essentially his own. He personally sailed one of them up along the Norwegian west coast, calling in all the ports with pilot services.

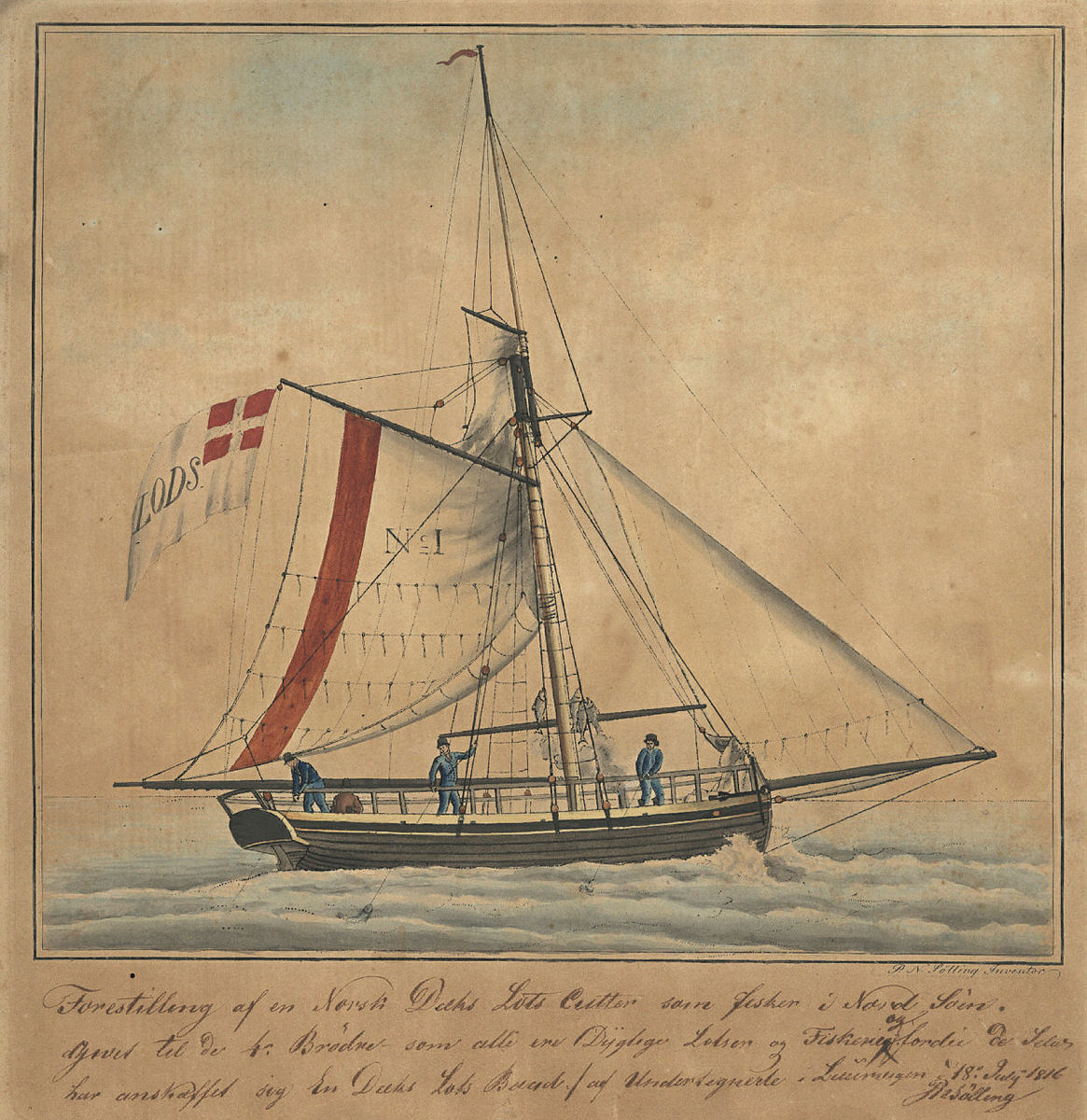
P. N. Sølling: Norwegian pilot boat fishing reef cod, 1901..h

In spite of initial hardships, he ultimately succeeded in winning the acceptance of the local pilots and fishermen. In 1801, he moved to Norway to personally oversee the construction, settling in Larvik where he constructed a house with a garden as well as a small dockyard. During the 14 years he spent in Larvik, between 1801 and 1815, he constructed a total of 29 pilot boats. In 1801, he was also charged with buying nine brigs for the Norwegian navy as well as with seeing to their armourment.

In 1806, he was appointed as enrollment officer and chief pilot in the district of Frederikshald. In 1808–14, he headed the coastal defense from Østerrisør to Kristiania.

=== Return to Denmark ===
In February 1814, Sølling returned to Denmark in search of new career opportunities. In the meantime, he made an attempt at sea fishing in the North Sea with two of his pilot boats. The result was not very successful, but the endeavor is none the less historically significant as the first attempt at fishing done in Denmark with larger sea-going vessels.

In 1817. Sølling was appointed as Waterschout in Copenhagen.

== Bombebøssen ==
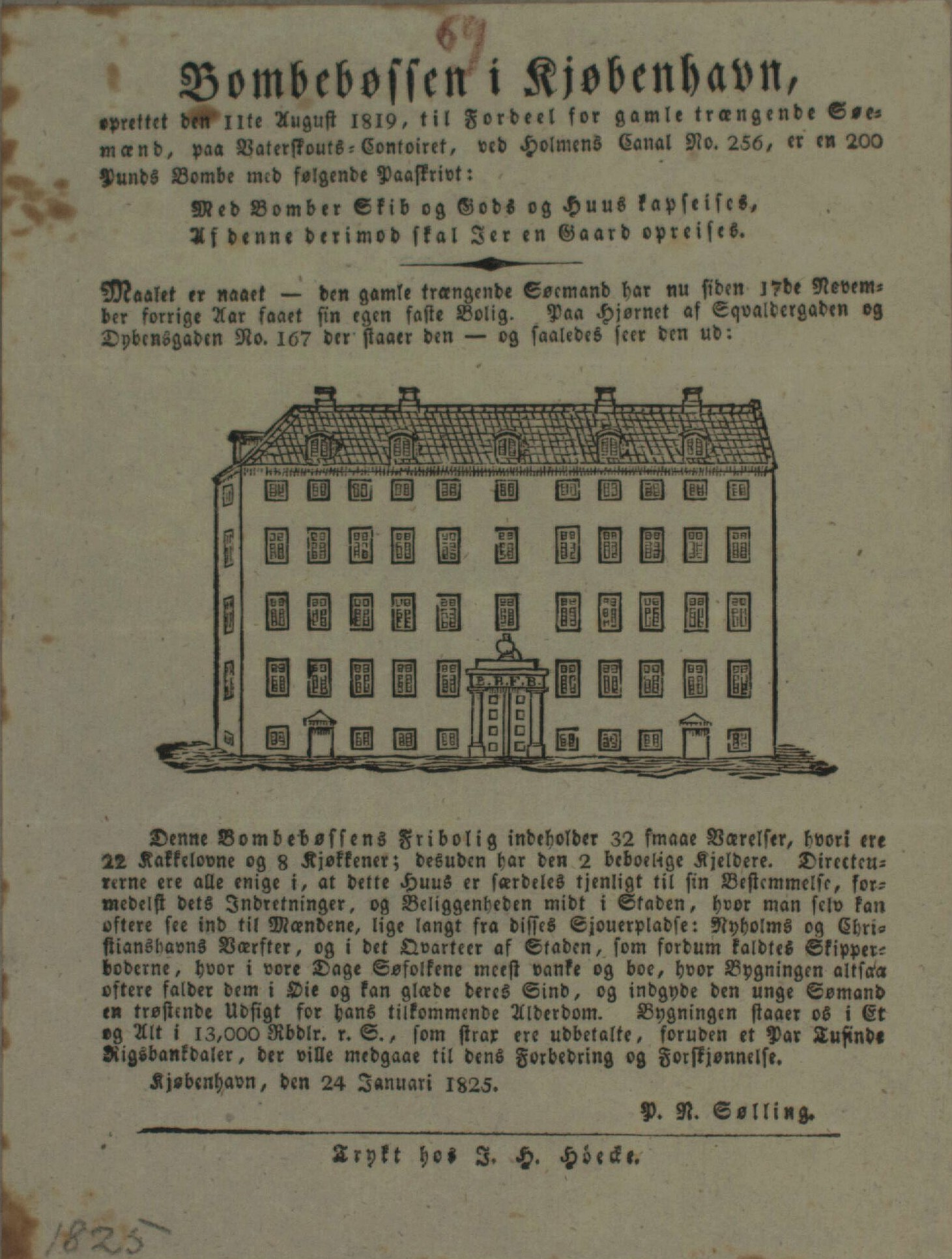
Bombebøssen in Dybensgade.

In his capacity of vaterskout in Copenhagen, Sølling was confronted with the miserable living conditions for old seamen after the war. In November 1819, he received royal permission to collect money for the establishment of a home for indigent seamen. He converted a British 200-pound bomb from the 1807 bombardment which had been found in Dybensgade into a collection box, installing it in the Skippers' Guild Hall in Ny Kongensgade. The institution first opened in two rented rooms at Wilders Plads in 1821.

In 1825, Sølling acquired a property on the corner ofDybensgade and Skvaldergade, close to St Nicolas' Church, which provided housing for 50 residents.

== Personal life and legacy ==
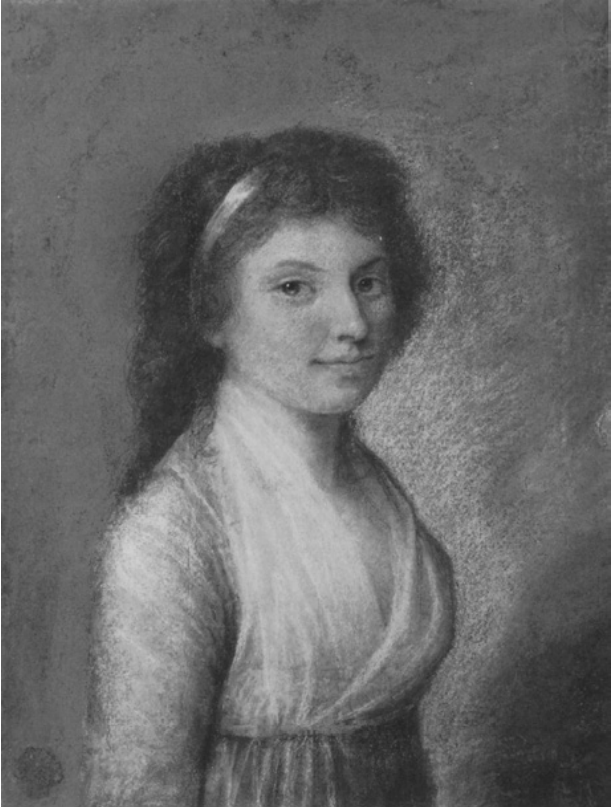
Amalia Abigael Norden Sølling, née Eskildsen

Sølling married on 15 October 1792 in Copenhagen Amalia Abigael Eskildsen (23 June 1772 - 28 August 1817), daughter of ship builder Erich Eskildsen (1738–93) and Maren Kirstine Drachmann (1747–1785). He They had seven children, five daughters and two sons, of whom only a few lived to adulthood. The son Erik Norden Sølling became a royal bookkeeper and customs officer in Rungsted. The daughter Emilie Norden Sølling married Peter Diderich Ibsen, owner of Mørup at Sorø and later vicar of Kongens Lyngby.

He lived with his family at Gråbrødretorv 6 at the time of the wife's death. In 1818, he moved to another apartment at Holmens Kanal 20. In 1821, he moved to a new apartment at Fortunstræde 3. In 1822, he moved to Gammel Strand 46. In 1826, he moved to Knabrostræde 3, and finally, in early 1827, to Amagertorv 4.

In 1809, Sølling was created a Knight in the Order of the Dannebrog. He died on 7 February 1827 and was buried in Holmen Cemetery.

Adam Oehlenschläger has written a poem about him and also mentions him in his memoirs.

Depictions include a portrait painting by C. A. Lorentzen (c. 1792, Frederiksborg Museum), an engraving by G.-L. Chrétien, a woodcutting based on the engraving by H. P. Hansen (1884, painting in Bombebøssen). miniature lithograph based on drawing by Christian Horneman, another portrait lithograph en profile by Hornemann, a portrait drawing by Christoffer Wilhelm Rckersberg and a number of other lithographs and woodcuttings. A portrait bust by F. E. Ring is in the collection of Ribe Art Museum.

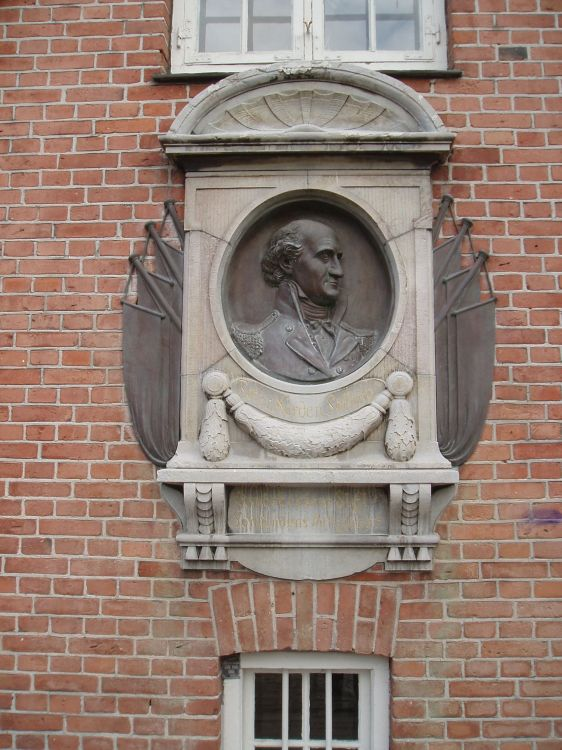
Bombebøssen in Dybensgade.h

In 1840, Bombebøssen moved to a new building in Brogade (No. 8) where the Ministry of Foreign Affairs stands today. In 1896, Bombebøssen relocated to a new building at Overgaden oven Vandet No. 48m overlooking Christianshavn Canal. The building was constructed at the initiative of Sølling's grandson Ivar Norden Sølling from a design by the prominent architect and designer Thorvald Bindesbøll. The facade features a memorial with a portrait relief of Sølling created by the sculptor Otto Evens. In 1954, Bombebøssen moved to a new building in Dronningensgade. The building in Dronningensgade was designed by the architect Peter Norden Sølling, a great-great-grandson of the founder. The building is home to 20 single seamen and 7 couples.
