= Knabrostræde 3 =

Building in Copenhagen Municipality, Denmark

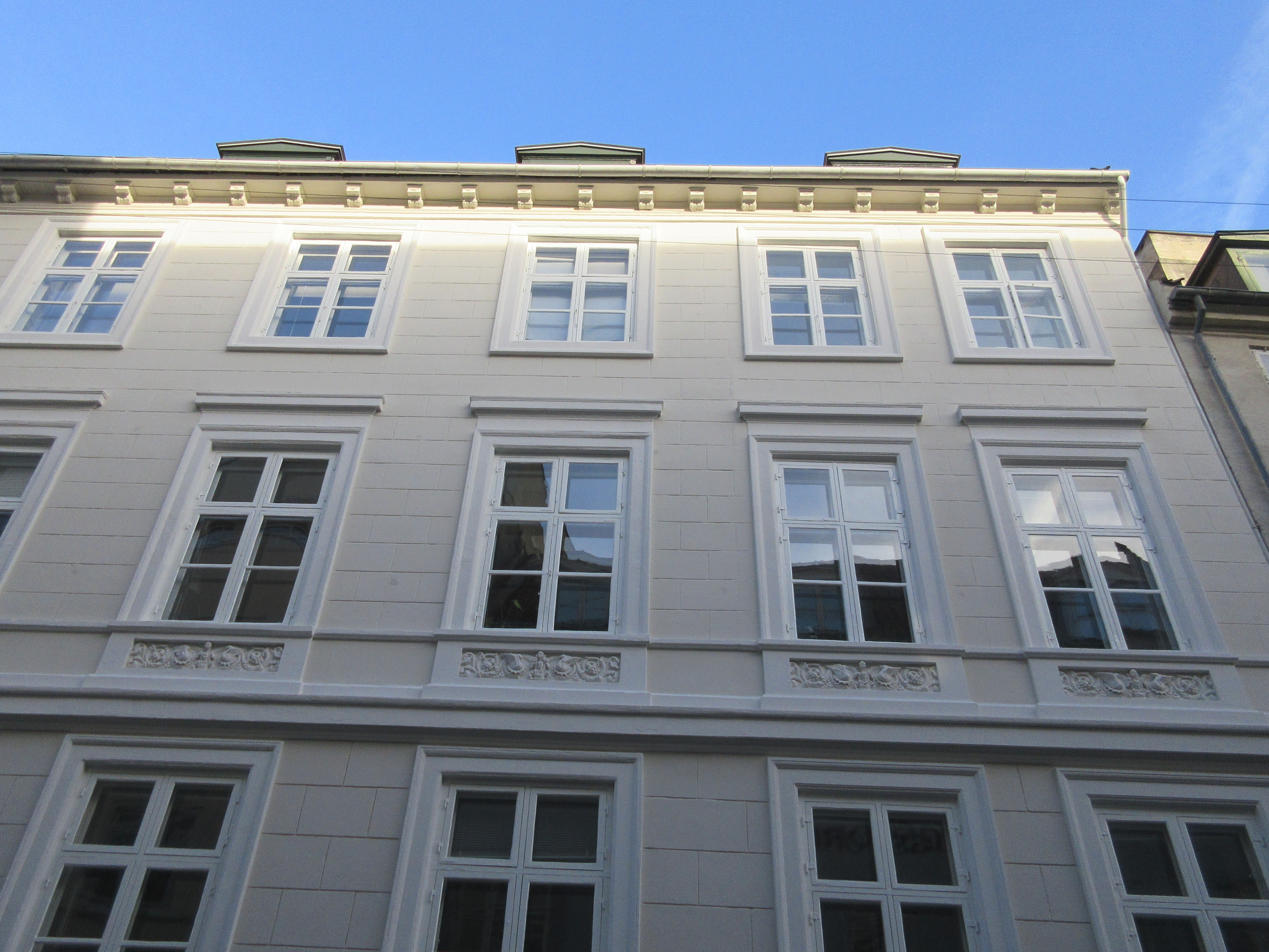
- Interactive map of the Knabrostræde 3 area

General information
- Location: Copenhagen, Denmark
- Coordinates: 55°40′40.84″N 12°34′27.98″E
- Completed: 1797
- Renovated: 1826, 1856 and 1870

Knabrostræde 3 is a Neoclassical property located off the major shopping street Strøget in central Copenhagen, Denmark. The building was like many of the buildings in the street constructed in the years after the Copenhagen Fire of 1795 but owes its current appearance to a comprehensive renovation in 1826 and an adaptation of the facade in 1859. On its rear is a small, partly cobbled courtyard with a former warehouse (No. 3 A) and a rear wing (No. 3 B). No. 3 was listed on the Danish registry of protected buildings and places in 1950. Chateau Motel, one of Copenhagen's largest dance and night clubs, has been based in the rear wing since 2017.

== History ==
The buildings at the site were destroyed in the Copenhagen Fire of 1795. The current building was in 1797 constructed for a sugar refinery simply known as Sukkerrafinaderiet (The Sugar Refinery). It was built on a property which continued all the way to Vimmelskaftet (now Knabrostræde 1). This large property was in the new cadastre of 1806 listed as Snaren's Quarter, No. 134.

The sugar refinery's building was in 1825 sold off and separately listed as No. 134B. It was subsequently subject to a comprehensive renovation the following year. The naval officer Peter Norden Sølling (1758-1827), remembered for founding the charity Bombebøssen in Christianshavn, was among the residents in 1826. At the time of the 1840 census, No. 134B was home to a total of 27 people. These included the Supreme Court lawyer Carl Christian Birch Liebenberg. The other residents included first lieutenant and kammerjunker Frederik Christian Wichfeld, the widow of pharmacist in Frederikssund Carl Ludvig Becker and a grocer (urtekræmmer). The military officer Christian Carl Lundbye (1812-1873) resided in the building from 1851 to 1856. He would later serve as Minister of Defense from 1856 to 1859 and again from 1863 to 1864.

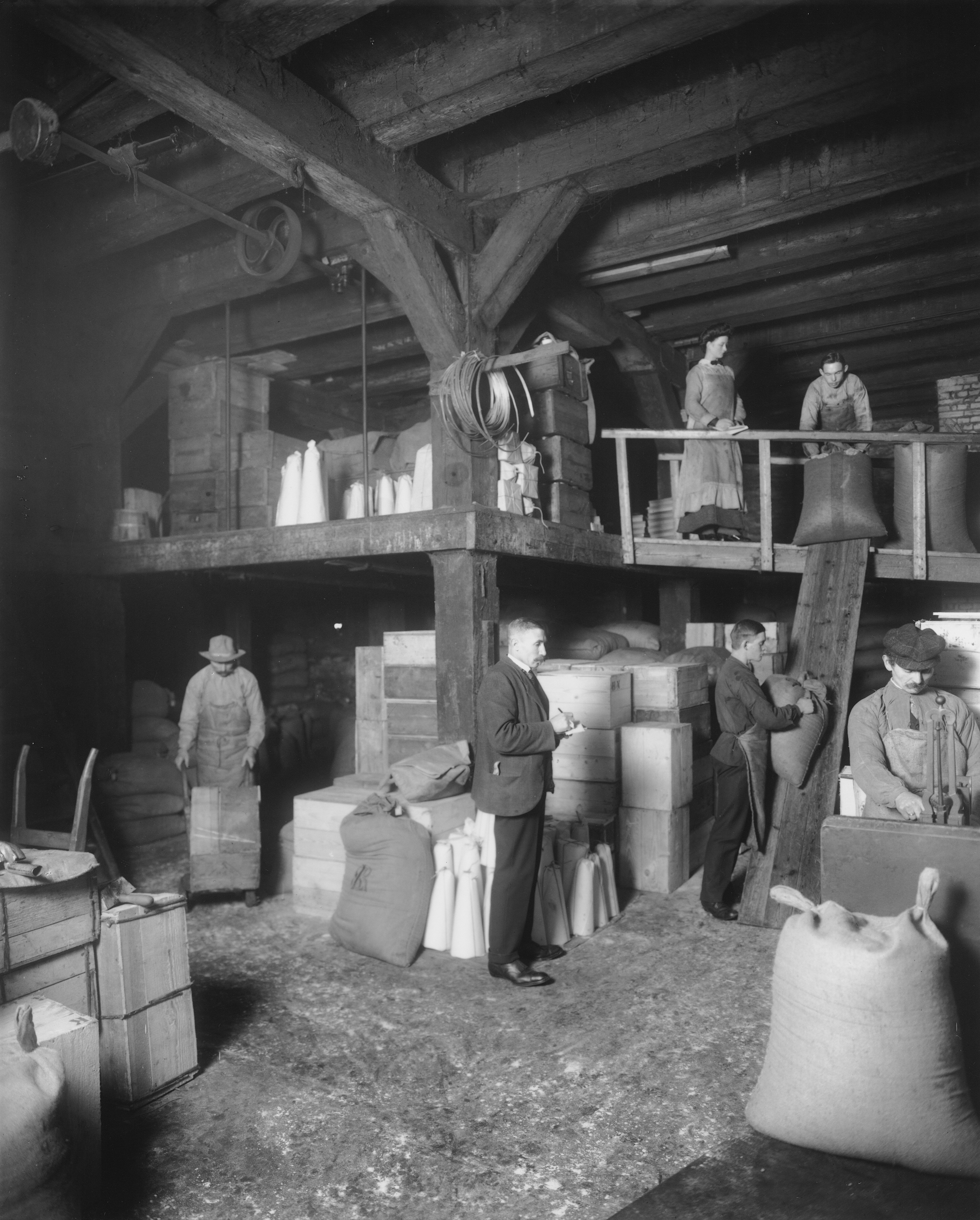
Mørck & Co. photographed by Peter Elfelt in 1912

With the introduction of House numbering in Copenhagen 1859, Snaren's Quarter No. 134 B became Knabrostræde 3. The painter L.A. Ring lived in the building in 1886–87.

On 19 July 1888, F. C. Hvilsom (1830-1903) opened a Stationery shop and bag manufactory in the building. The activities were later expanded with a book printing facility at Rolighedsvej 18. The enterprise was upon his death continued by his widow Rosalie Hvilsom and their sons E. E. Hvilsom (1881-1927) and F. V. Hvilsom (1880-1936). In 1906, F. C. Hvilsoms Sønner was moved to Gothersgade 76. Mørcl & C., a coffee roastery, was after the turn of the century for a while based in the rear wing.

Pan Club Copenhagen, an LGBY night club, opened in the rear wing in 1980. It closed on 14 April 2007. It was later on and off continued as an LGBT night club under other names until 2016.<ref">"Genåbning af Pan Club Knabrostræde (1996)" (in Danish). Out & About.</ref>

== Architecture ==
No. 3 consists of three storeys over a raised cellar and is ten bays long. The sugar refinery's building was already in 1826 subject to extensive alterations and was prior to this just five bays long. The current facade design dates mainly from another adaptation in 1856. The building has rusticated finishing on the ground floor, stucco decorations with lion heads under the windows on the first Storey and a cornice supported by corbels under the roof. The building was also subject to alterations in 1870. The gateway opens to a small, partly cobbled courtyard. A short perpendicular side wing extends from the rear side of the building.

A former warehouse (No. 3A) and a rear wing (No. 3B) are located in the courtyard. The former warehouse is five bays wide with large central openings with shutters and a wall dormer with the remains of a pulley.

== Today ==
Knabrostæde 3 was by 2008 owned by E/F Knabrostræde 3. It has later been sold to Jorcks Ejendomsselskab. The tenants include Jorcks Ejendomsselskab, a developer of video games.

Chateau Motel, a dance and night club, opened in Pan Club's former premises in 1996.

== Gallery ==
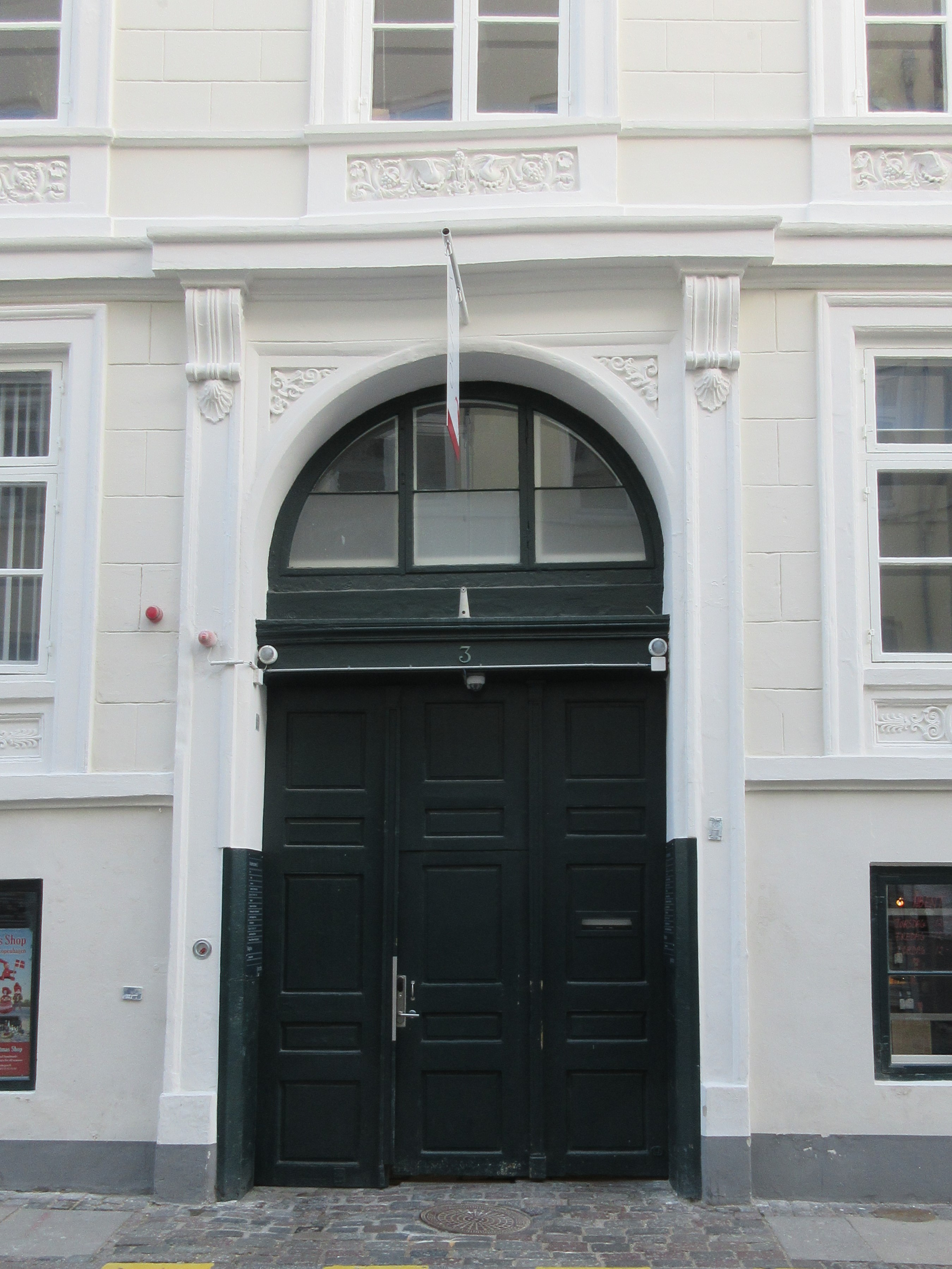
Gate

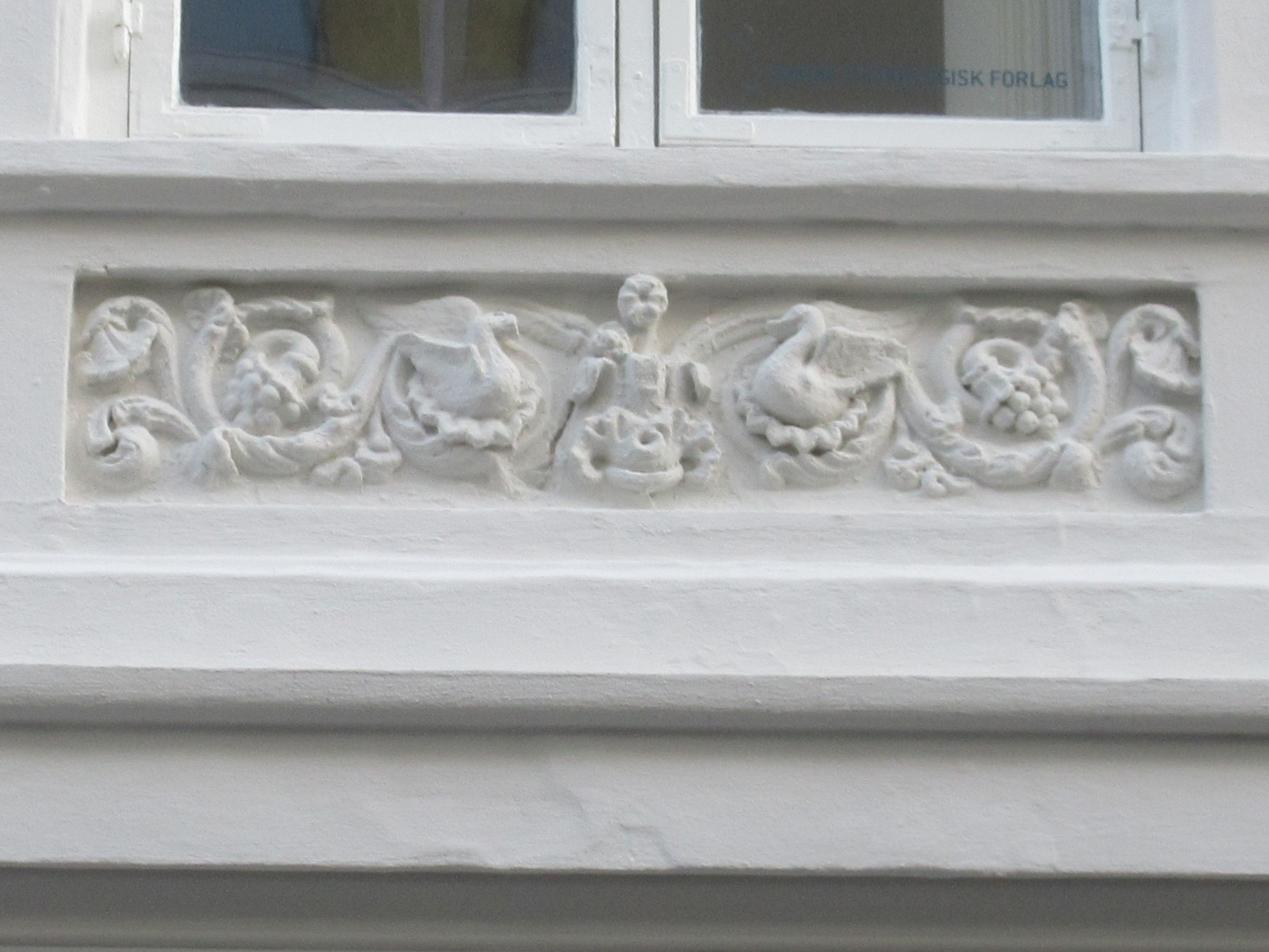
Stucco decoration below one of the windows
