= Gråbrødretorv 14 =

Neoclassical property in Copenhagen, Denmark

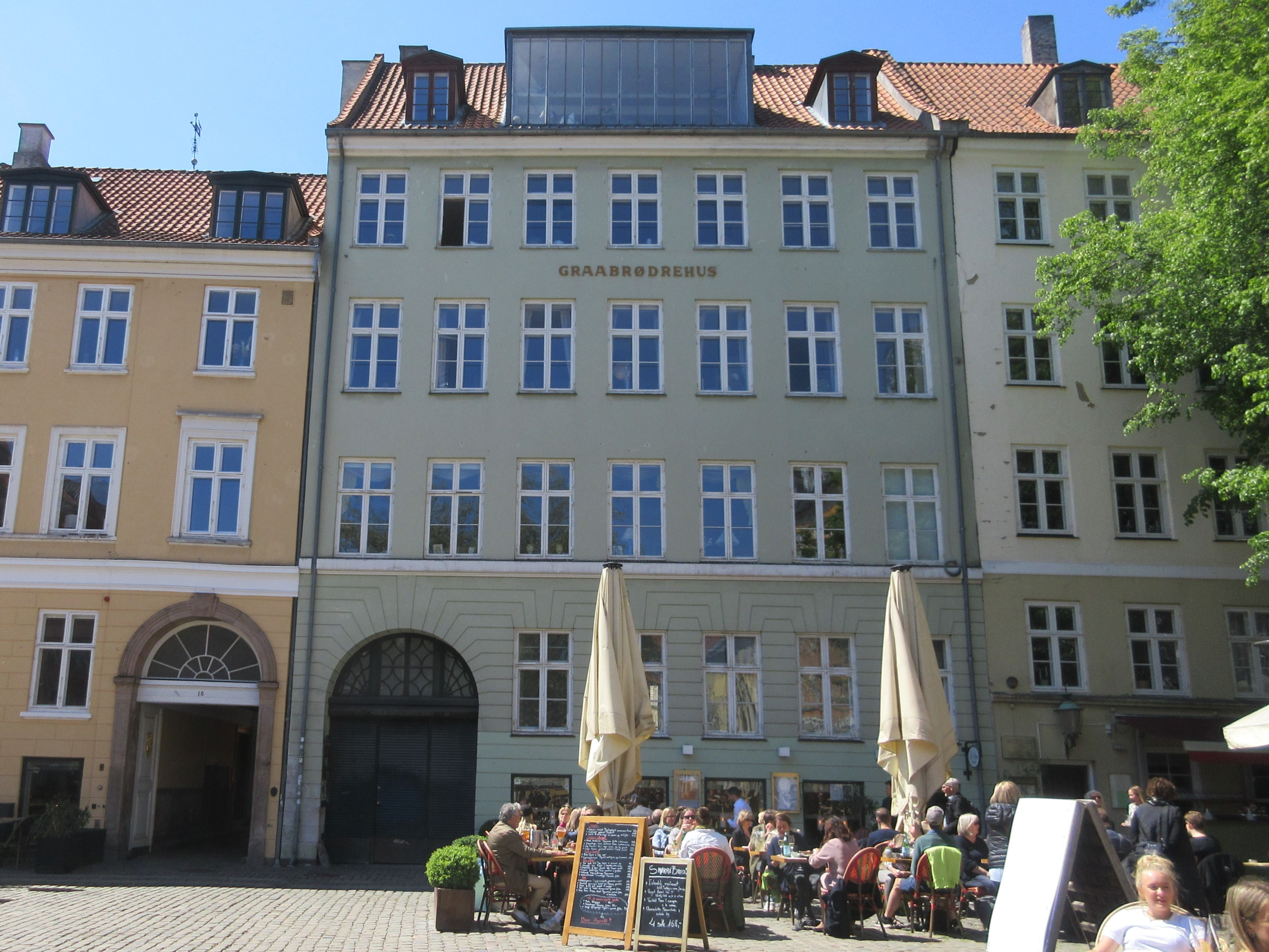
- Interactive map of the Gråbrødretorv 14 area

General information
- Architectural style: Neoclassical
- Location: Copenhagen, Denmark
- Coordinates: 55°40′47.24″N 12°34′31.33″E
- Completed: 1828

Gråbrødretorv 14, also known as Gråbrødrehus, is a Neoclassical property situated on the west side of Gråbrødretorv in the Old Town of Copenhagen, Denmark. It was listed in the Danish registry of protected buildings and places in 1945. There is a large atelier window in the garret where the artist Edvard Lehmann lived and worked in the building in the 1860s and 1870s.

== History ==
=== 18th century ===
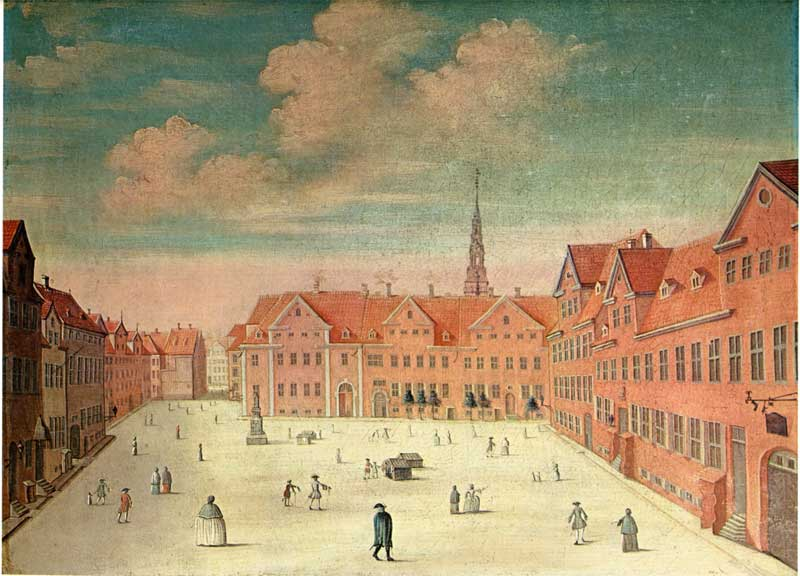
The west side of the square in 1748, painting by Johannes Rach

The site was in 1689 part of a larger property. In 1689, it was as No. 125 in Frimand's Quarter owned by Krigsråd Mejer's widow and consisted of four tenancies. After the Copenhagen Fire of 1728 the property was divided into a number of smaller properties. The building constructed on the site was a two-storey building with a facade crowned by a large, three-bay gabled wall dormer. It was built to one of Johan Cornelius Krieger's standard designs created in connection with the rebuilding of the city after the fire.

The property now known as No. 14 was by 1756 as No. 115 in Frimand's Quarter owned by painter Mathias Godtlieb Krebs.

=== 19th century ===
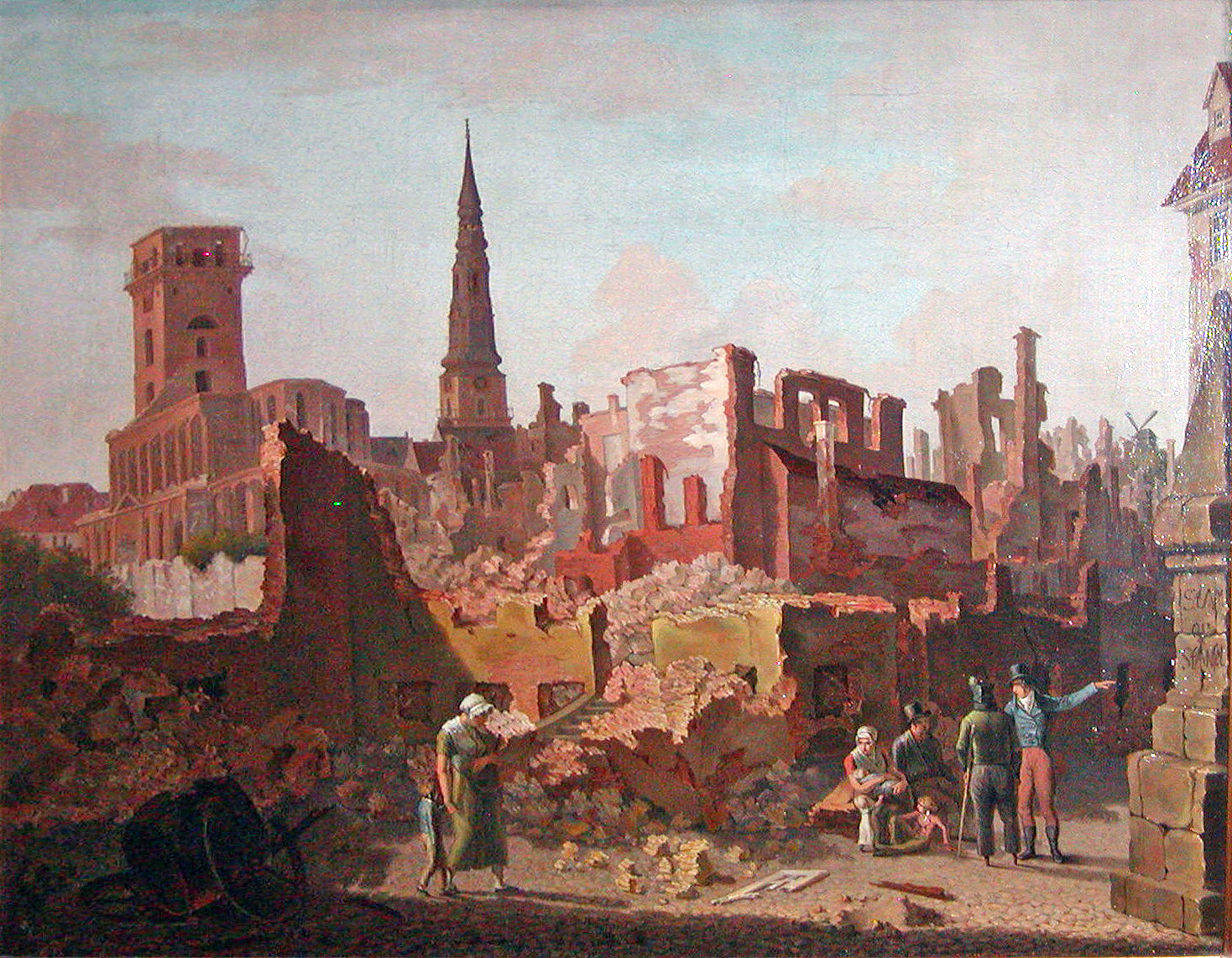
The west side of the square after the Battle of Copenhagen in 1807

The property was home to four households at the 1801 census. One of the households consisted of the 60-year-old widow Charlotte Nyborg, two young apprentices, a maid and the 52-year-old, unmarried Supreme Court attorney Hans Haagen. Hans Haagen was a relative of the Chief of Police of the same name. The second household consisted of the innkeeper Hans Hansen Rønnemus, his wife Mette Maria Nielsen, a maid and three lodgers. Two of the lodgers were musketeers in the King's Regiment and the third one a soldier in the Zealand Regiment. The third household consisted of master glovemaker Johan Schiønstrøm, his wife Helene Binbierg and their five children. The fourth household consisted of the widowed commissioner Jacob Eghardt, his two sons and a housekeeper.

The property was in the new cadastre of 1806 listed as No. 98. It was by then owned by clerk at Politiretten Andreas Berg. The building was the following year together with the other buildings on the west side of the square destroyed in the British bombardment of Copenhagen.

The current building was constructed in 1828 for master joiner F. E Schrøder. He initially operated a furniture workshop from the premises. The actor Carl Winsløw (1796–1834) resided in the building from 1831 until his death three years later.

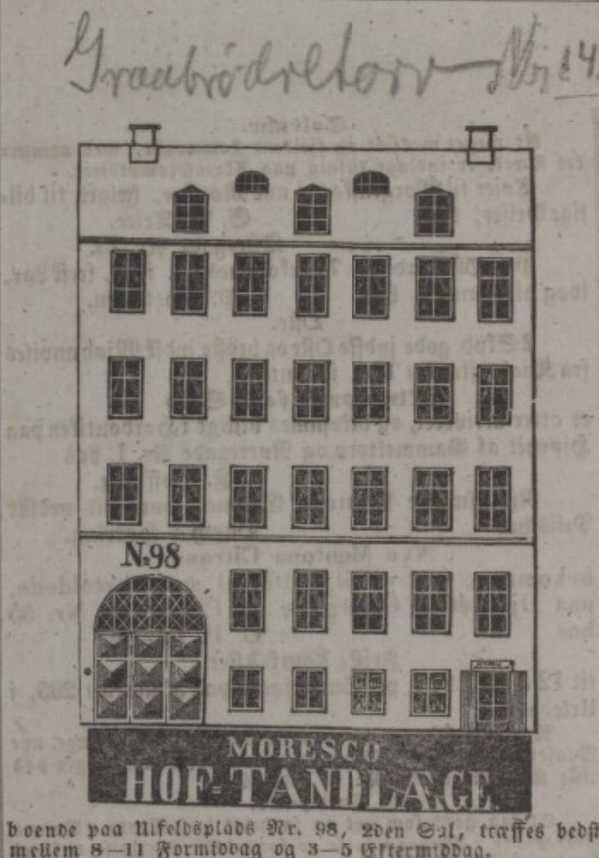
Advert for "Court Dentist Moresco" at Gråbrødretorv

The property was at the time of the 1840 census home to a total of 28 people. Master joiner Johan Jouchim Schrøder resided with his wife Susanne Elisabeth Schrøder née Kofod and their six children in the rear wing. Royal history painter Christian Fædder Høyer (1775–1855) resided with his three unmarried sisters in the apartment on the first floor towards the street. Christine Rothe, widow of krigsassessor Frode Fredegode Rothe (1783–1824), resided with her daughter Thora and a maid on the ground floor. Thora Rothe would later marry the naval officer and director of the Royal Danish Nautical Charts Archives Hans Peter Rothe. Erasmus Kiernholm and Frederik Christian Kiernholm were residing with a maid and a servant on the second floor. The apartment of the third floor was occupied by 41-year-old Christian Poul Dricherm, his mother, another widow and a maid. Holger Rosenstand, a grocer (urtekræmmer), resided with an apprentice in the basement.

Court dentist Maximillian Moresco (1791–1846) was later based in the building, He had come to Denmark from The Hague in around 1820. He was the father of the later fashion retailer Jacob Heinrich Moresco. Jacob Moresco resided in the building from 1868 to 1886. The painter and lithegrapher Edvard Lehmann (1815–1892) resided on the third floor from 1864 to 1875.

=== 20th century ===
The bookbinding firm Carl Raff's Efterfølger was based in the building in 1910. It belonged to Marius Raff at that time.

== Architecture ==
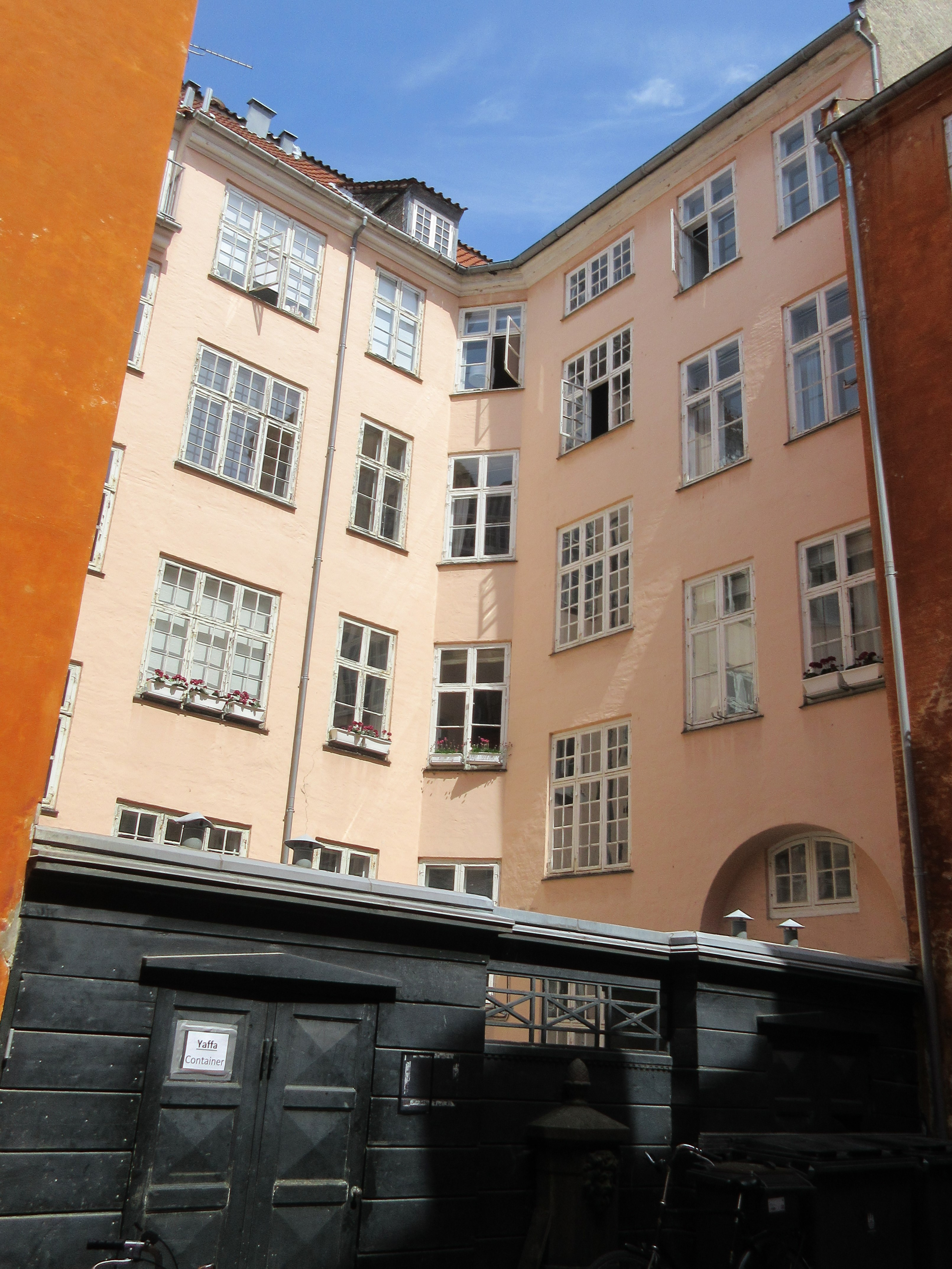
The front wing (right) and the perpendicular wing (left) seen from the courtyard of No. 16.

Gråbrødrehus is a three-winged complex, surrounding three sides of a small courtyard, constructed in brick with four storeys over a walk-out basement. The facade, which is plastered and painted in a pale green colour, with shadow joints on its lower part, is finished with a white-painted sill course below the windows on the first floor and a substantial cornice.

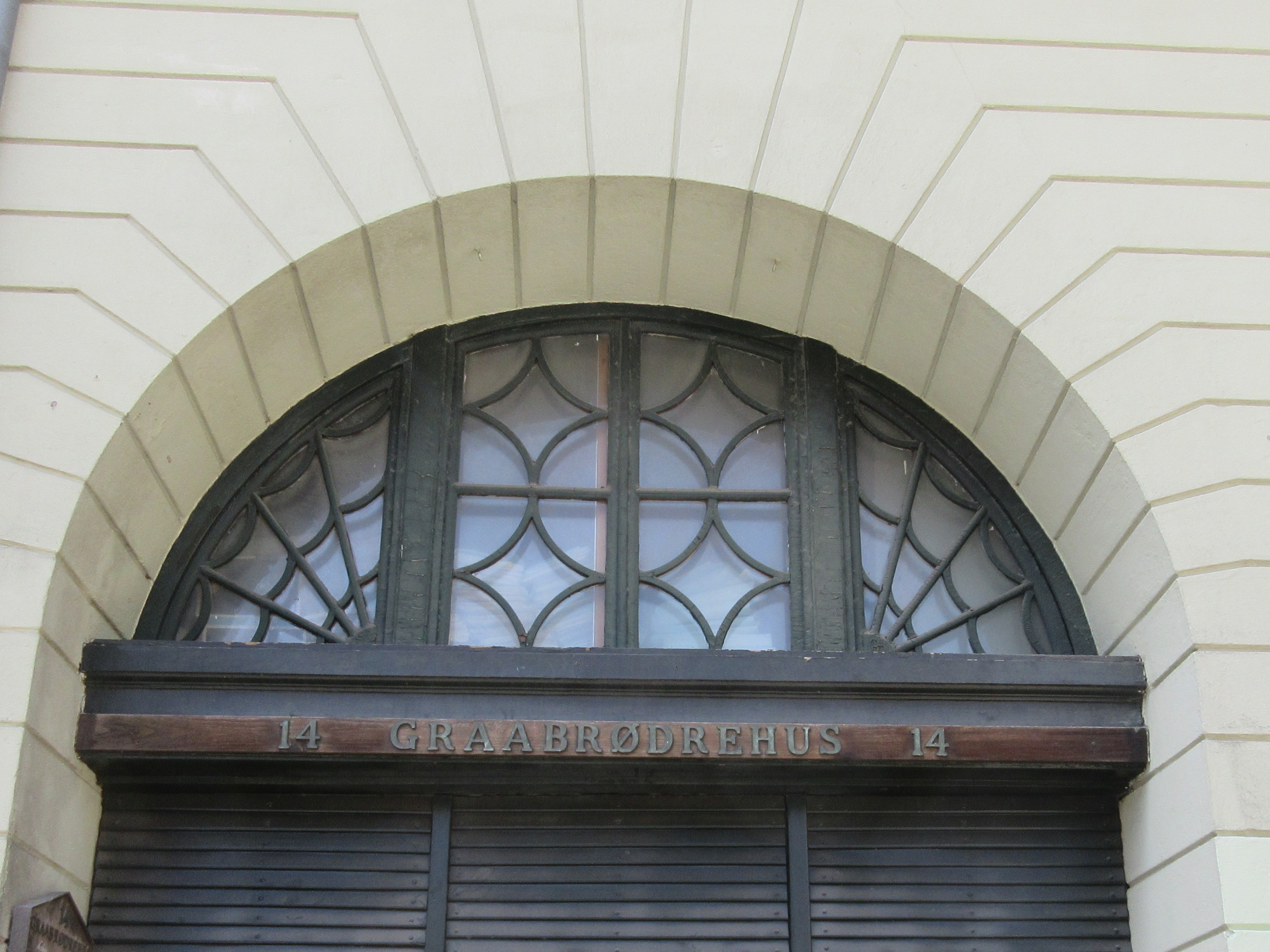
The fanlight.

A two-bay green-painted gate, topped by a fanlight and with the name of the building written on the transom, opens to the small courtyard. A door in the north wall of the gateway provides access to the main staircase of the building. The basement entrance is located in the bay furthest to the north (right). The red tile roof is pierced by two chimneys. A large atelier window flanked by two smaller dormer windows faces the square.

Therear side of the front wing and the perpendicular wing meet in a diagonal cornerbay. The facades towards the yard are plastered and rendered in a pale yellow colour. The courtyard is to the south separated from that of No. 16 by a low wall.

== Today ==
The building contains one condominium on each floor in the front wing. It is owned by Ejerforeningen Gråbrødrehus, Restaurant Le Pavé has been based in the basement since 1994.
