= Bombebøssen =

Residential building in Copenhagen, Denmark

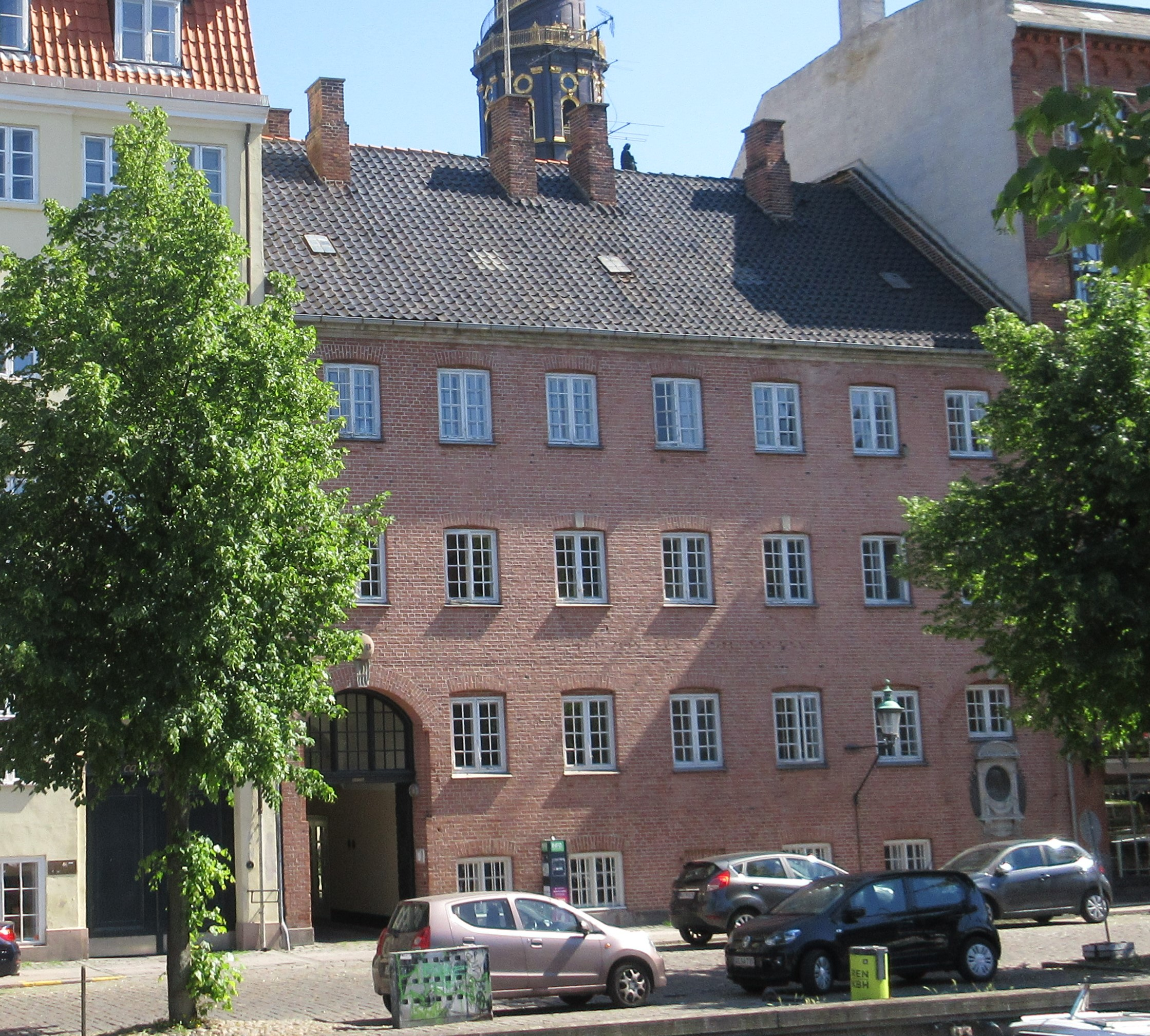
The building viewed from across the canal

Bombebøssen is a listed property from 1896 overlooking Christianshavn Canal in the Christianshavn neighbourhood of central Copenhagen, Denmark. It was built by the charity Sømandsstiftelsen Bombebøssen to provide housing for indigent seamen.

== History ==
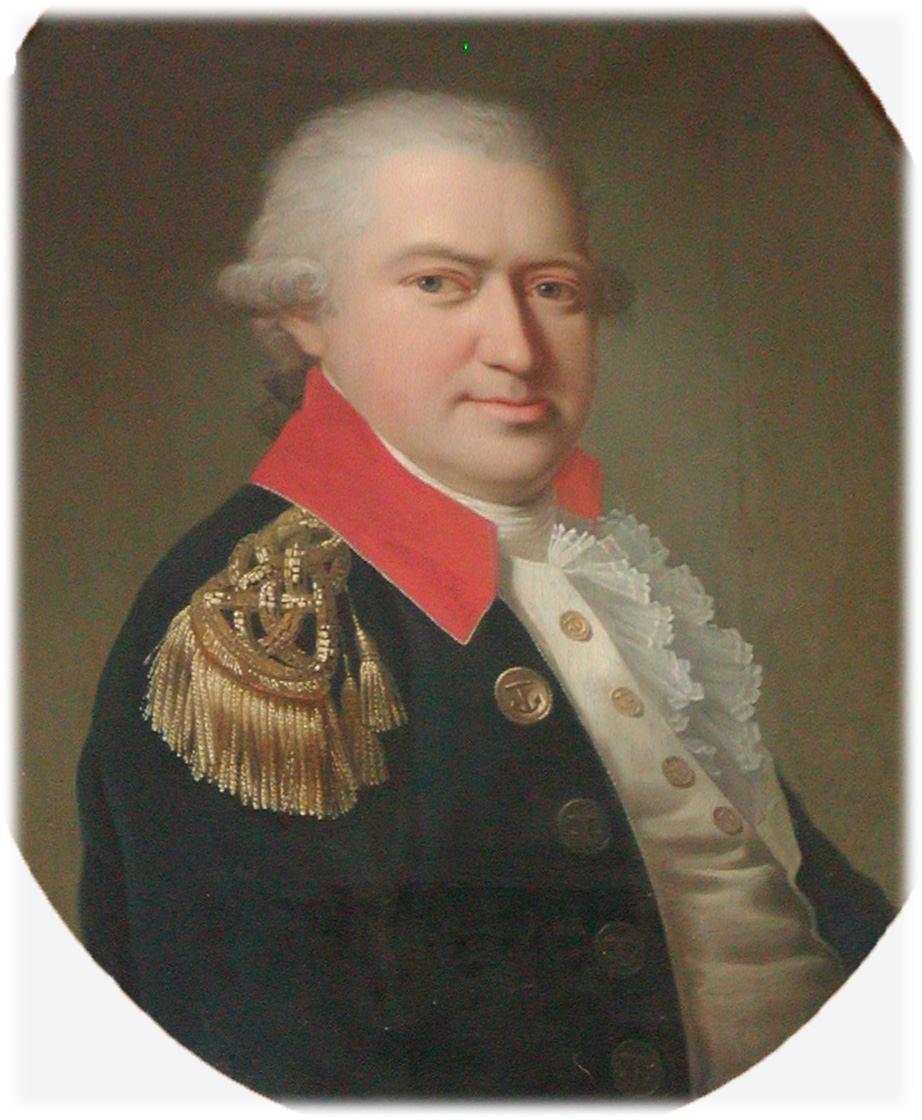
Peter Norden Sølling

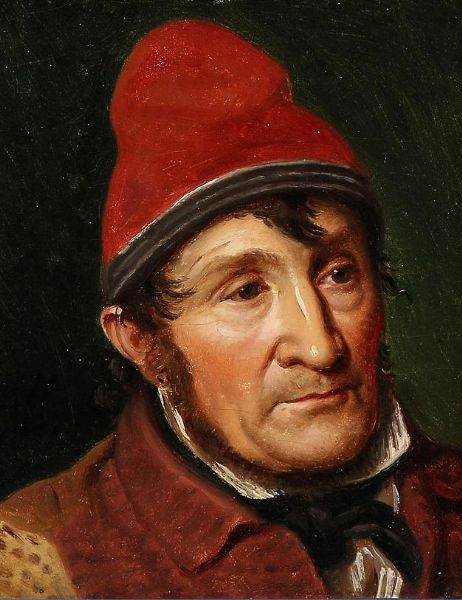
Constantin Hansen: Portrait of Jean Holm, a pauper Bombebøssen

Sømandsstiftelsen Bombebøssen was founded on 2 November 1819 by kommandør Peter Norden Sølling. Sølling was born in 1758 in Kristianssand in Norway to Danish parents and enrolled at the Naval Academy in Copenhagen at age 12. He later worked for several of the large trading companies and served as captain on voyages to China.

After the English Wars, he became a Waterscout in Copenhagen. The loss of the Danish fleet in 1807 and the national bankruptcy in 1813 led to difficult times for the Danish maritime sector and severe unemployment for the many Danish seamen. Sølling witnessed the hardships of the seamen through his work and decided to take action, asking the king for permission to collect money for the establishment of a home for indigent seamen. He converted a 200-pound bomb from the 1807 bombardment, which had been found in Dybensgade, into a mite box. The institution first opened in two rented rooms at Wilders Plads in 1921.

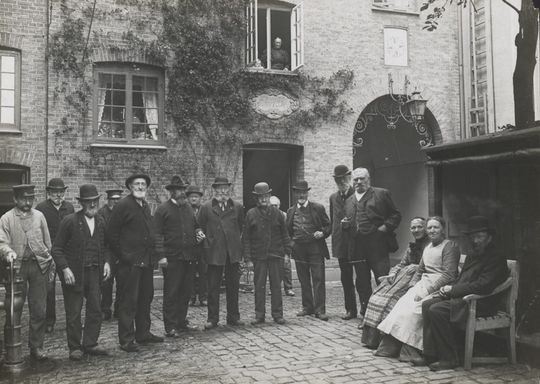
Bombebøssen's yard in 1908: A ceremony marking the 150-year anniversary of Sølling

In 1825, Sølling acquired a property on the corner ofDybensgade and Skvaldergade (now Nikolajgade 20/Dybensgade 20), close to St Nicolas' Church, which provided housing for 50 residents. In 1840 the institution moved to a new building in Brogade (No. 8) where the Ministry of Foreign Affairs stands today. The current building on Overgaden oven Vandet No. 48 was built in 1894. In 1954, Bombebøssen moved to a new building in Dronningensgade.

== Buildings ==
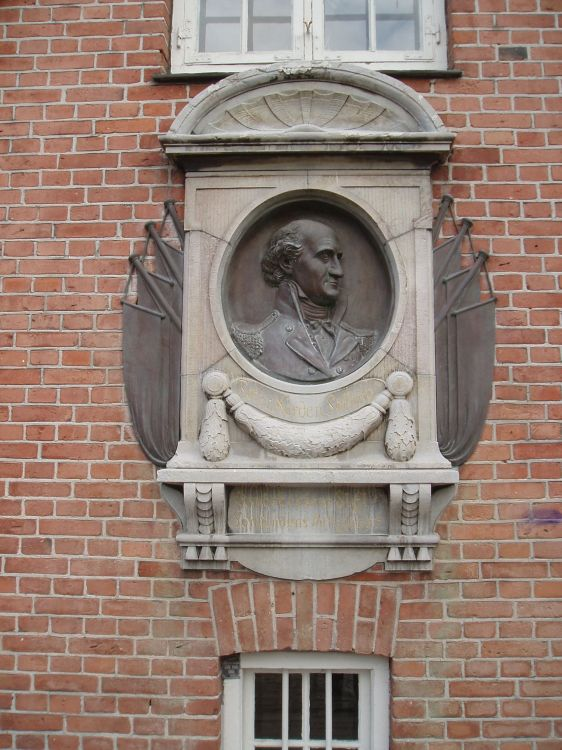
The relief of Bombebøssen-founder Sølling on the façade of the building at Christianshavn Canal

=== Overgaden oven Vandet 48 ===
The building on Overgaden was designed by Thorvald Bindesbøll and is listed. It is built in red brick and consists of three storeys and a cellar. The façade features an embedded bomb above the gate and a bas-relief of the founder created by the sculptor Otto Evens.

=== Dronningensgade 69 ===
The building in Dronningensgade was designed by the architect Peter Norden Sølling, a great-great-grandson of the founder. The building is home to 20 single seamen and 7 couples.
