= 1848 in Denmark =

- Decades: 1820s; 1830s; 1840s; 1850s; 1860s
- See also: Other events of 1848; List of years in Denmark

Events from the year 1848 in Denmark.

== Incumbents ==
- Monarch – Christian VIII (until January 20), then Frederick VII
- Prime minister – Poul Christian Stemann (until 22 March), Adam Wilhelm Moltke

== Events ==
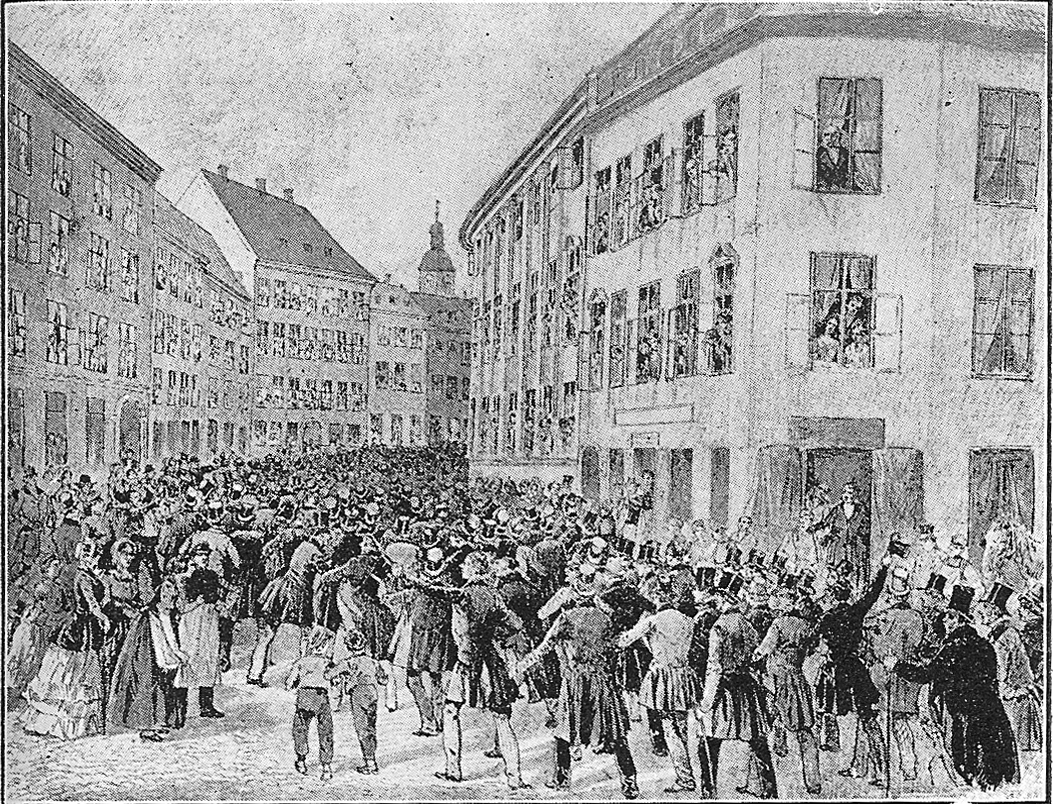
Demonstration for democratic reforms on 21 March in Copenhagen

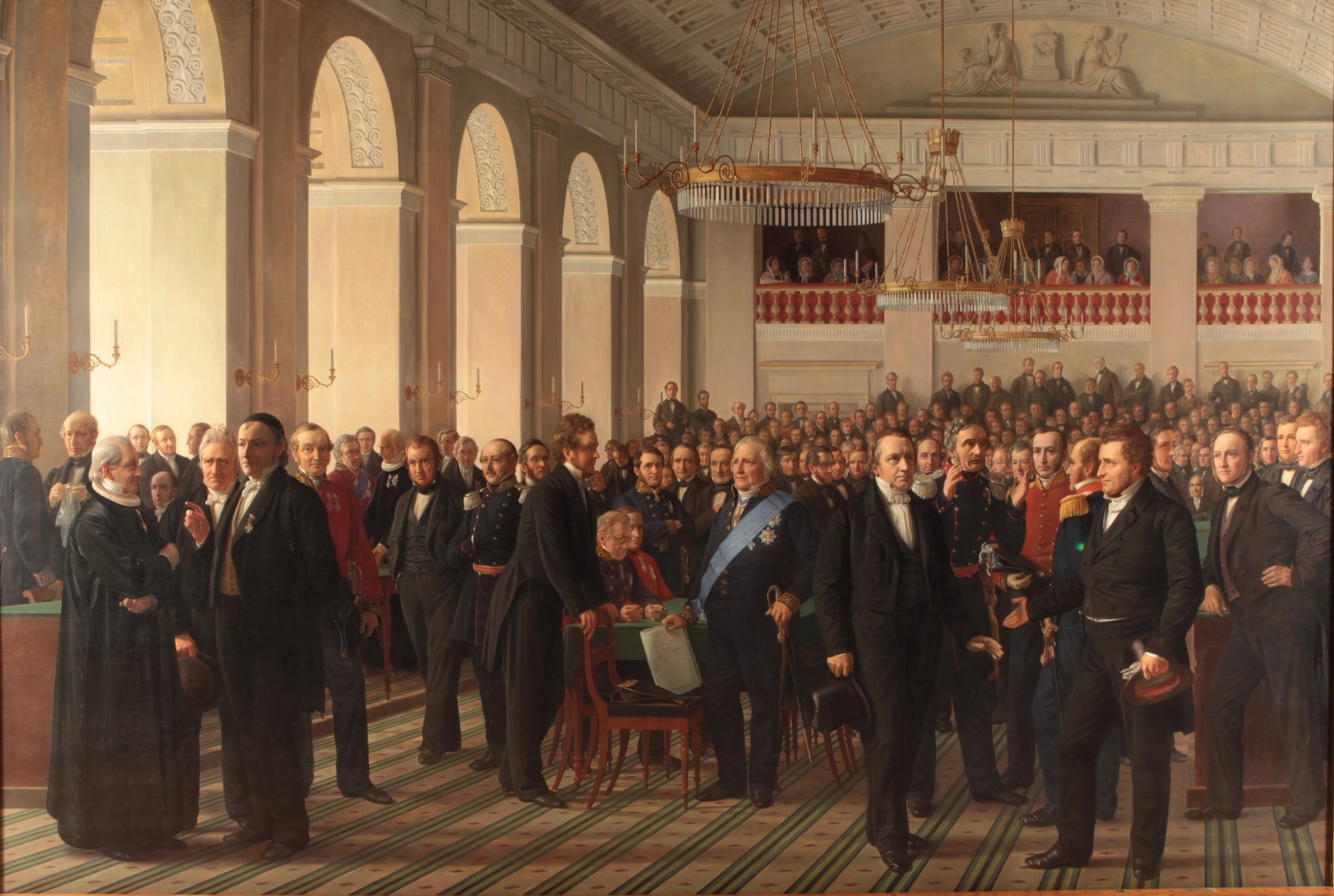
The Constitutional Assembly at Christiansborg Palace in 1848, painted by Constantin Hansen between 1861 and 1865

=== March ===
- 21 March – A large demonstration goes to Christiansborg Palace. Absolutism is abolished.
- The outbreak of the First Schleswig War

=== April ===
- 9 April – The Battle of Bov, the first battle of the war, is won by Denmark.
- 29 April – The Battle at Schleswig: Prussia has now entered the war and the German side has almost three times as many soldiers as Denmark, which has to withdraw to Funen. Jutland is left open to the German troops.

=== July ===
- 3 July – Slavery is definitively abolished in the Danish West Indies. It is officially confirmed on 22 September.

=== October ===
- 15 October – The 1848 Danish Constituent Assembly election is held. 113 of the 158 are elected of the Danish Constituent Assembly are elected. The remaining 44 members are appointed by the king.
- 23 October – The Constitutional Assembly meets at Christiansborg Palace
- The Conventicle Act was repealed

== Births ==
- 20 March – Johan Lange, botanist (died 1898)
- 2 June – Poul Sveistrup, politician and social statician (died 1911)
- 16 September – Kristiane Konstantin-Hansen, weaver, textile artist, retailer and feminist (died 1925)
- 28 December – Sophus Christopher Hauberg, industrialist (died 1920)

== Deaths ==
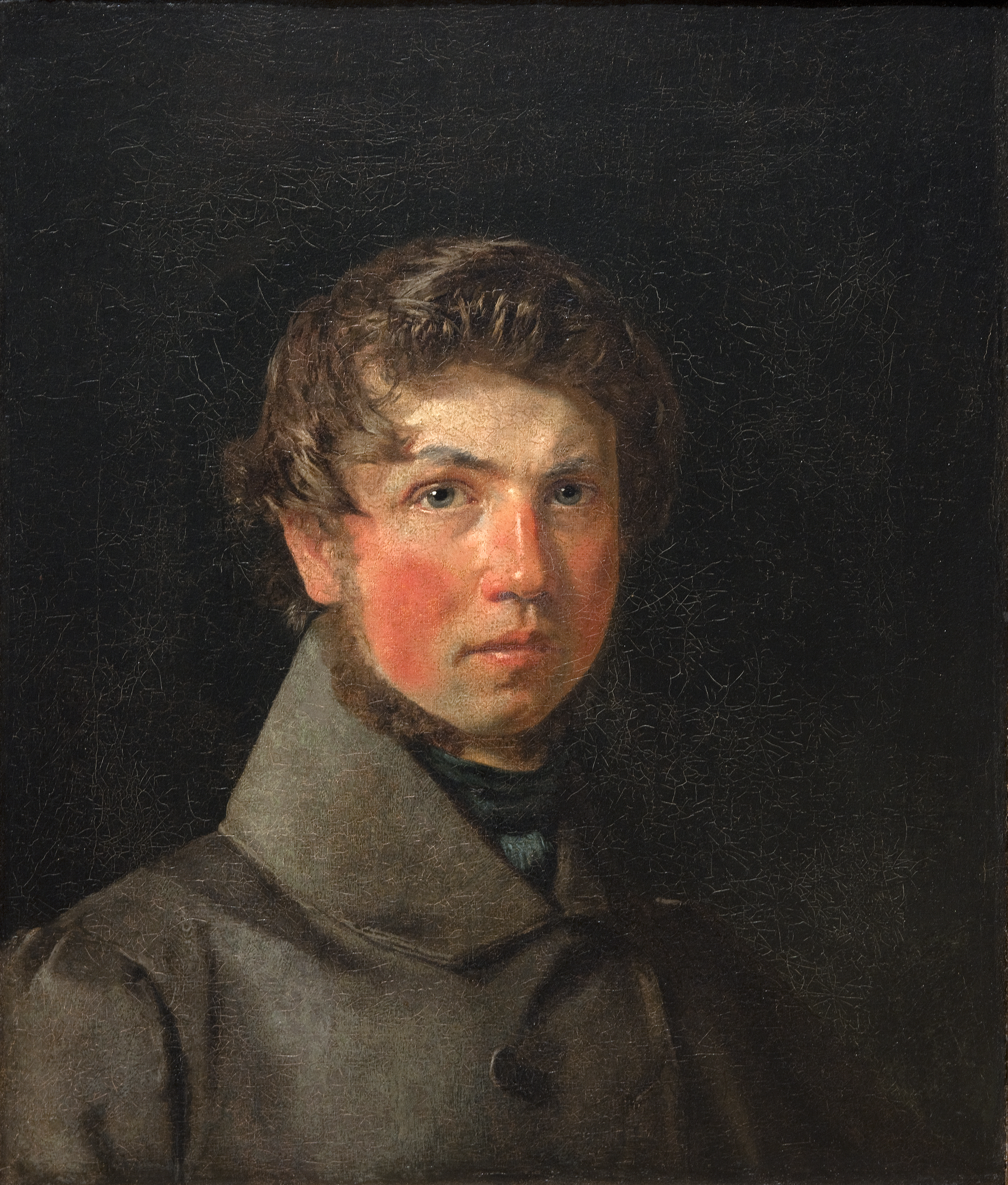
Christen Købke.

=== January–March ===
- 20 January – Christian VIII, King of Denmark (born 1786)
- 29 January – Peter Thonning, physician and botanist (born 1775)
- 7 February – Christen Købke, painter (born 1810)
- 26 March – Steen Steensen Blicher, author (born 1782)

=== April–June ===
- 26 April – Johan Lundbye, painter (born 1818)
- 27 May – Hermann Christian Müffelmann, businessman (born 1775)

=== July–September ===
- 29 August – Martinus Rørbye, painter (born 1803)

=== October–December ===
- 8 December – Moses DelBanco, lawyer (born 1794)
