= Sveistrup =

Sveistrup is a Danish surname. Notable people with the surname include:

- Hans Sveistrup (1815–1893), Danish priest
- Poul Sveistrup (1848–1911), Danish social statistician
- Søren Sveistrup (born 1968), Danish screenwriter
- Jody Sveistrup (born 1969), Canadian curler
- Jakob Sveistrup (born 1972), Danish singer

== See also ==
- Søren Svejstrup (born 1937), Danish diver
- Svejstrup, Danish village
