= Dybensgade 22 =

Neoclassical

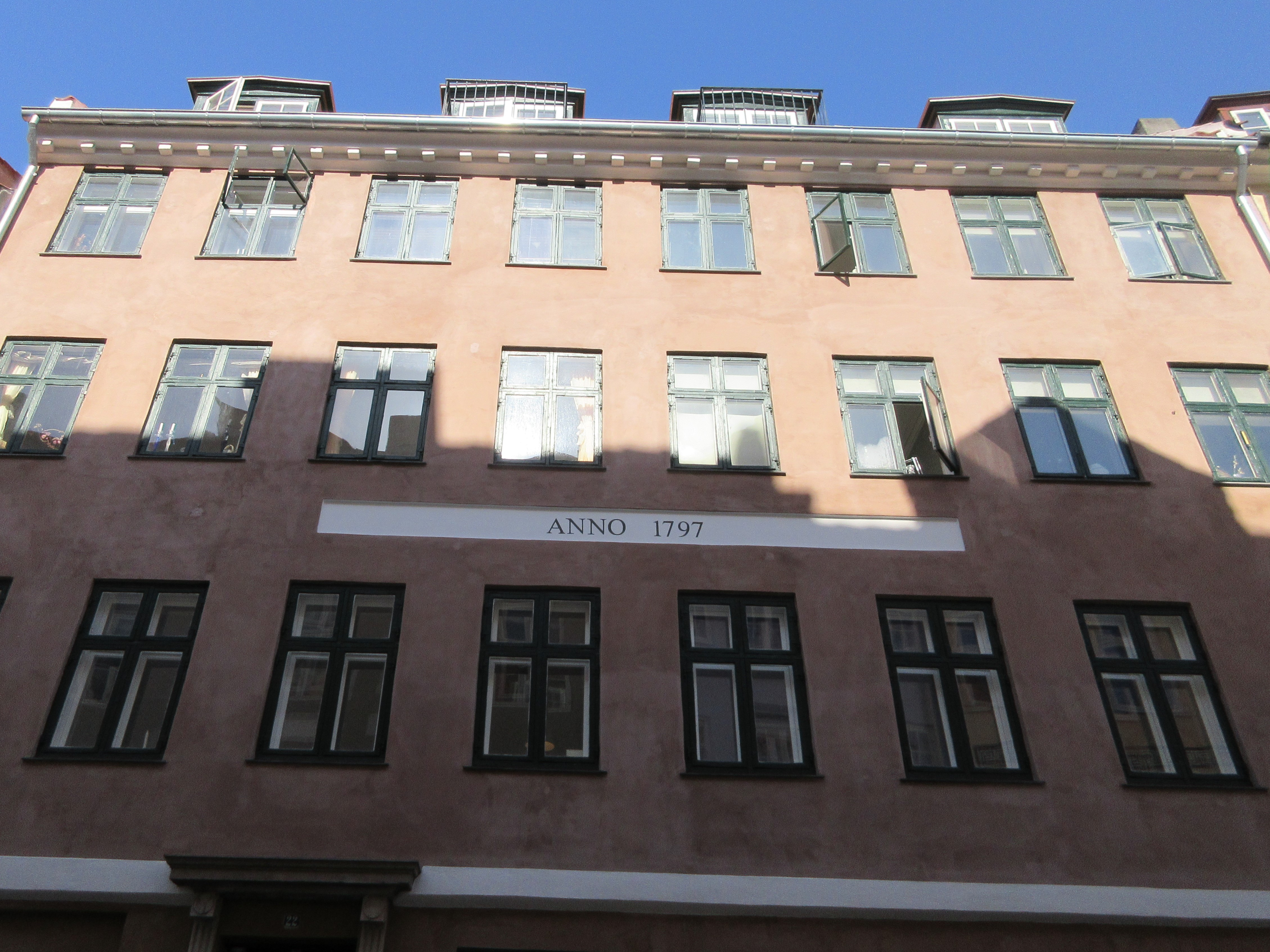
- Interactive map of the Dybensgade 22 area

General information
- Architectural style: Neoclassical
- Location: Copenhagen, Denmark
- Coordinates: 55°40′40.58″N 12°34′56.57″E
- Completed: 1797

Dybensgade 22 is a Neoclassical property situated close to Nikolaj Plads in central Copenhagen, Denmark. The building dates from the rebuilding of the city following the Copenhagen Fire of 1795. It was listed in the Danish registry of protected buildings and places in 1945.

== History ==
=== 18th century ===
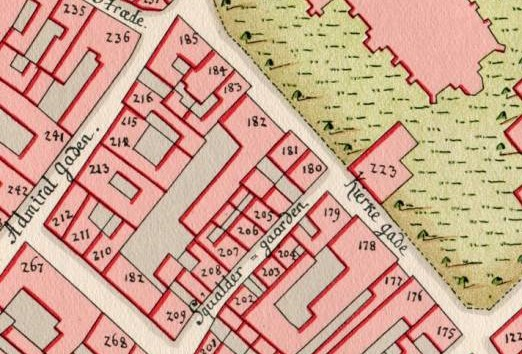
No. 182 seen on a detail from Christian Gedde's map of the East Quarter, 1757.

What is now Dubensgade 22 and Nikolaj Plads 25 on the other side of the block was for centuries the site of the clergy house of St. Nicolas' Church. The property was in 1689 as No. 95 in the East Quarter occupied by Magister Henriksen. In 1756, it was listed as No. 182 in the East Quarter occupied by Nikolaj Brodersen. He had been appointed as minister of St. Nicolas' Church in 1738.

The property was at the time of the 1787 census occupied by pastor of St. Nicolas' Church Hans Sørensen Lemming and his two daughters. The eldest daughter Regina Lemming was a widow and lived there with her son Hans Lemming who was a second lieutenant in the navy. The younger daughter and Eleonora Lyngbye were still unmarried. They lived there with one servant and two maids.

The building was together with the church and most of the other buildings in the area destroyed in the Copenhagen Fire of 1795. The fire site was subsequently divided into No. 182 A (now Nikolaj Plads 25) and No. 182 B. No. 182 B was acquired by candlemaker Jens Almind. The current building on the site was constructed for him by the master builder and architect Jens Dahl (1776–1840) in 1797. Almind was in 1796–97 also responsible for the construction of the new building around the corner at Admiralgade 213 (later Admiralgade 163, now Admiralgade 19). Dahl was also responsible for the construction of the adjacent building at Dybensgade 24.

=== 19th century ===
Jens Almind's daughter Anna Almind was at the time of the 1801 census residing in one of the apartments with her husband Jens Strarup, their two daughters and a maid. Jens Strarup (1773–) was studying theology and would later be appointed as pastor of Højrup Church.

The property was in the new cadastre of 1806 listed as No. 166. It had by then been acquired by a man named Skousgaard.

At the time of the 1840 census, the property was home to a total of 25 people. Hendrik Olsen, a master tailor, resided with his wife and three lodgers on the ground floor. Lars Hansen, concierge at Christiansborg Palace, resided with his wife, their son and two lodgers on the first floor. Bergite Mølbye bée Lassen, a widow who made a living from teaching, resided with her two daughters and two lodgers on the second floor. The two daughters and one of the lodgers were occupied with needlework while the other lodger was a bookprinter. Daniel Peter Danielsen, a master shoemaker, resided with his wife, their four children and four lodgers in the basement.

== Architecture ==
Dybensgade 22 is an eight bays long building constructed in brick with four storeys over a walk-out basement. The facade is towards the street rendered in a pale orange colour, with white decorative details, contrasted by the dark green windows, door and gate. The facade is finished by a belt course above the ground floor and a modillioned cornice. The inset white band between the four central windows of the two upper floors was until 1835 the site of a stucco frieze similar to the one still seen on many of the surrounding buildings but which now features the inscription "Anna 1797". The main entrance is raised four steps from the street level and is topped by a hood mould supported by fluted corbels. A similar hood mould is located above the ground floor window furthest to the east. It was originally placed above a second doorway which was removed in 1858. The gate furthest to the left (west) opens to a small courtyard. The rear side of the building is finished with finished with yellow lime mortar.

== Today ==
Dybensgade 22 contains two condominiums on the first to third floor and one condominium on the first floor and in the garret. The property is jointly owned by the owners via E/F Dybensgade 22,

== Gallery ==
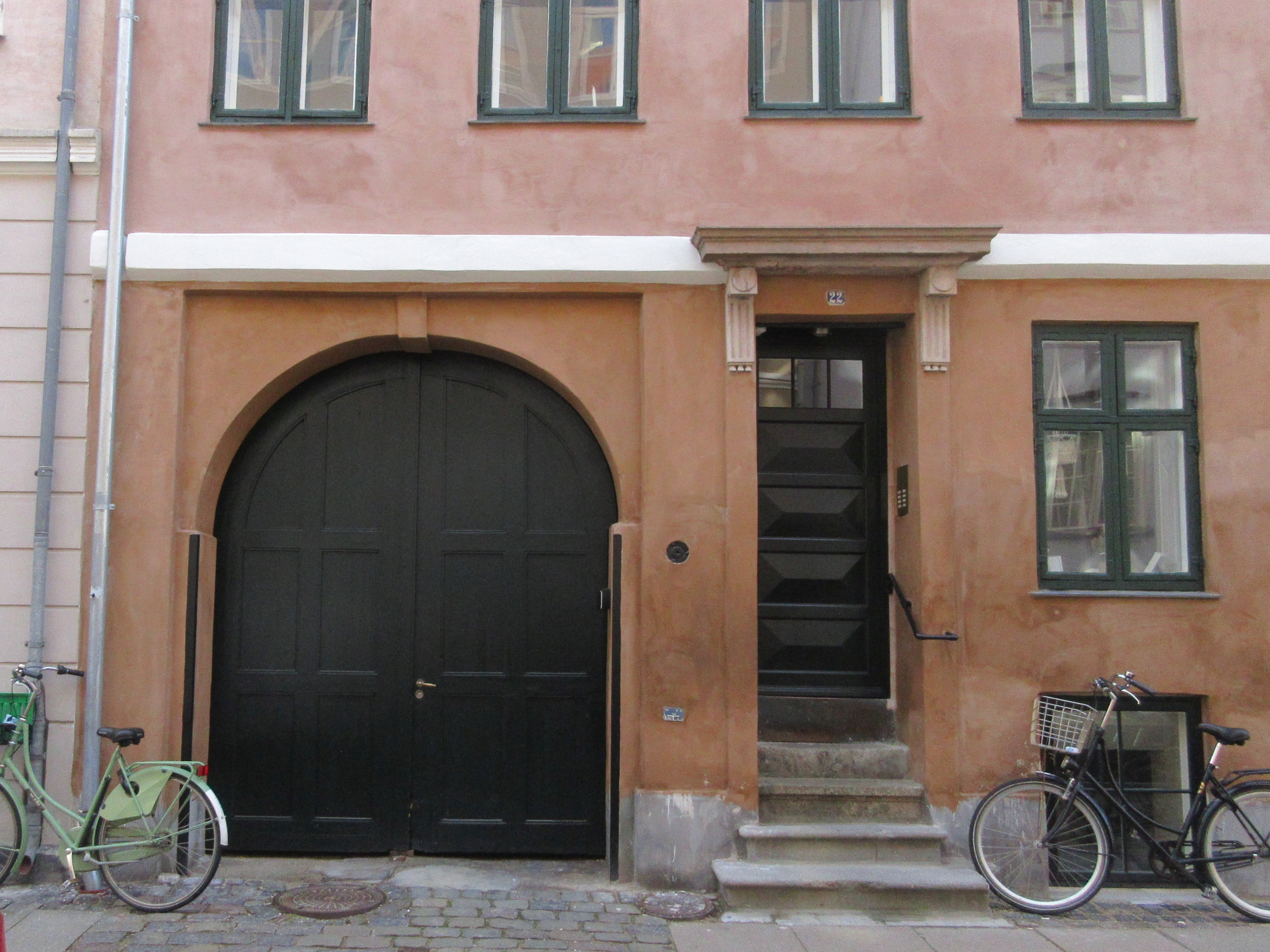
Gate and door in the three westernmost bays

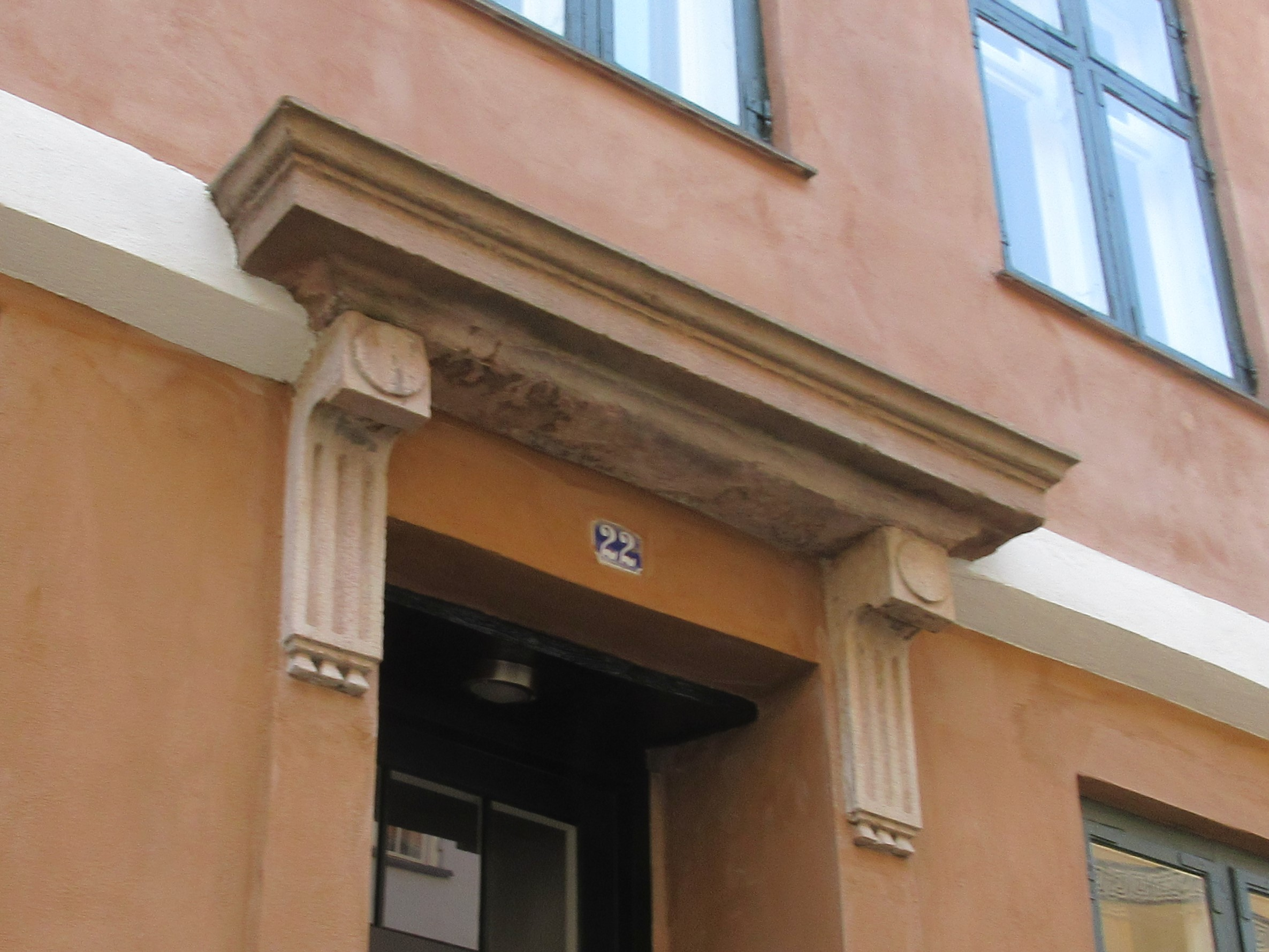
Close-up of the hood mould above the main entrance
