= Das deutsche Schrifttum über den Völkerbund =

- Author: Fritz Juntke, Hans Sveistrup
- Subject: League of Nations history
- Published: 1927 (Struppe & Winckler)

Das deutsche Schrifttum über den Völkerbund, 1917–1925 (The German Literature on the League of Nations), is a book edited by Prussian librarians Fritz Junkke and Hans Sveistrup in 1927; the work is a bibliographic collection of German-language publications on the activities of the League of Nations, that contains, both, monographs and journal articles - as well as some newspaper notes.
