= Kronprinsessegade 18 =

Building in Copenhagen

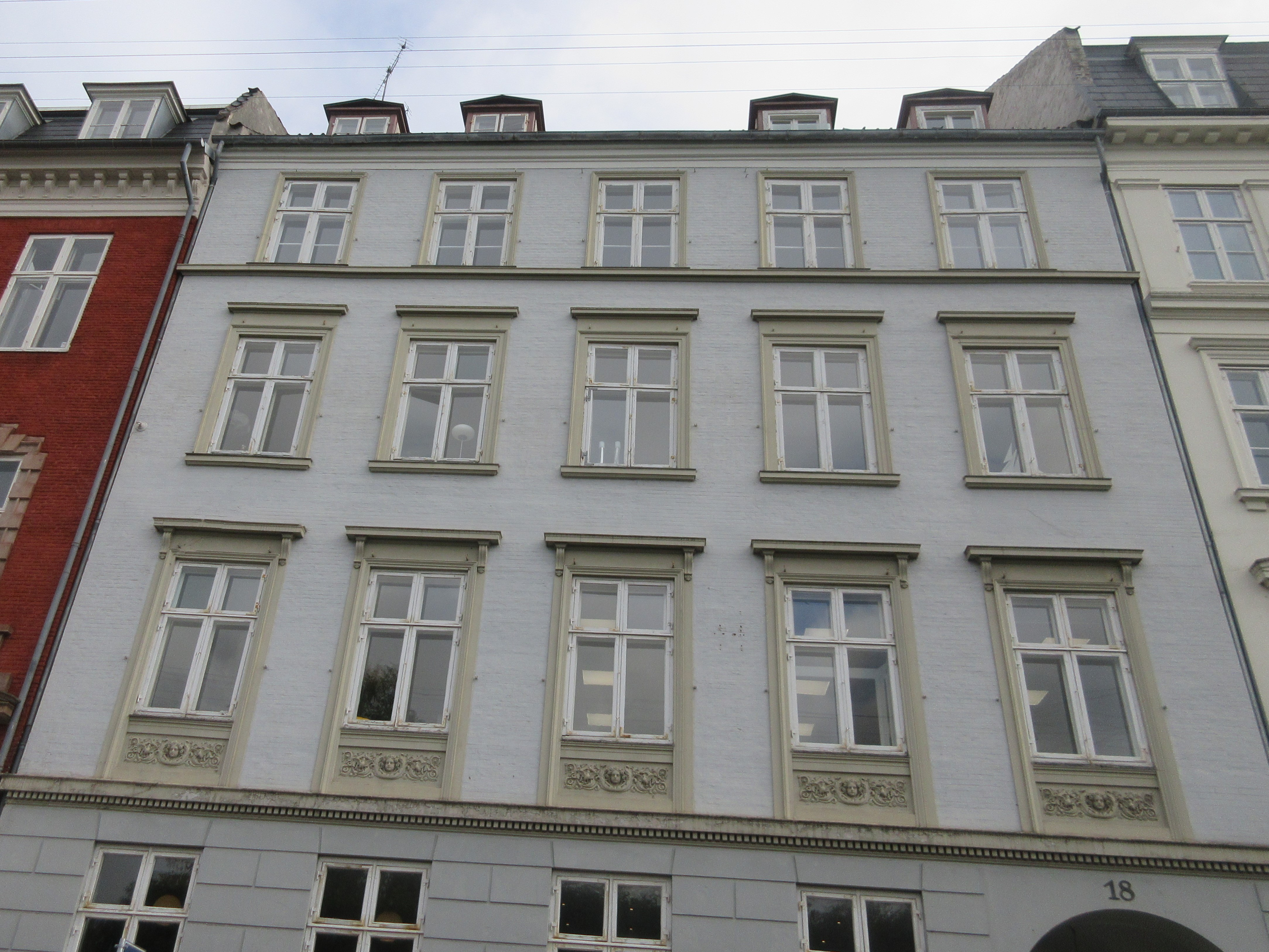
- Interactive map of the Kronprinsessegade 18 area

General information
- Architectural style: Neoclassical
- Location: Copenhagen, Denmark
- Coordinates: 55°41′1″N 12°34′54.16″E
- Construction started: 1807
- Completed: 1813

Kronprinsessegade 18 is a Neoclassical property overlooking Rosenborg Castle Garden in central Copenhagen, Denmark. The building was together with the adjacent buildings at No. 6–18 constructed by the master builder Johan Martin Quist. It was listed in the Danish registry of protected buildings and places in 1945.

== History ==
=== Construction ===
Kronprinsessegade was created in 1802 on a strip of land that had until then been part of Rosenborg Castle Garden. The land had been presented to the City of Copenhagen by the Crown as partial compensation for a regulation of the city's street network following the Copenhagen Fire of 1795. A large plot of land was acquired by the master builder Johan Martin Quist (now No. 6–18).The site now known as Kronprinsessegade 18 was initially referred to as lots No. 1 and No. 2A. The still undeveloped property was listed in the new cadastre of 1806 as No. 391 in St. Ann's West Quarter. The present building on the site was finally constructed by Qvist in 1807–13 as the last of his seven Kronprinsessegade buildings.

=== 1834 census ===
Niels Weborg, an Admiralty commissioner, resided on the third floor at the 1834 census. He lived there with his wife Hansine Henriette Weborg, their one-year-old daughter, 17-year-old Hansine Christine Bagger, a wet nurse, one male servant and one maid.

=== 1840 census ===
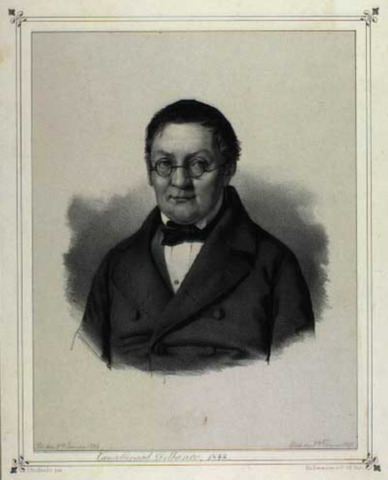
Moses Delbanco.

The lawyer Moses DelBanco (1784–1848) resided on the first floor at the 1840 census. He lived there with his Beata Delbanco (née Kalkar, 1785–1758), their three children (aged 20 to 25), his sister-in-law Fredericke Lakkar (1798–1852) and two maids. Alexandre Philippe de Jonquieres, a bookkeeper in Frederick de Coninck's trading firm, resided on the second floor with his widowed sister-in law Anne Hedwig de Høyer, her sons Jean Francois de Jonquières (1815–1890), Henry Alexandre Antoine de Jonquieres (1816–1879) and Godefroy Chretien de Jonquieres (1818–1883) and sister Christiane Sophie Høyer, a female cook and a maid. Frederik Henrik August Clausevitz, a government official (Geh. Legationsraad) and Notarius Publicus, resided on the third floor with his wife Ida Hedevig Christine Clausevitz, their three-year-old daughter, one male servant, two maids and the lodger Peter Henrich Hammeleff (student at the Military High School). Abraham Magnus resided on the ground floor at the 1840 census. He lived there with his wife Rebekka Magnus, three yunmarried daughters (aged 21 to 27), a 41-year-old relative, a husjomfru and a maid. Johan Andersen, a barkeeper, resided in the basement with his wife Lovise Caroline Andersen, their five children (aged one to 15) and one maid.

Johan Christian Mølsted, a ropemaker, resided on the first floor of the side wing with his wife Andrea Bache, their son Christian Edvard Mølsted and his mother-in-law Christine Bache.

=== 1845 census ===
The property was home to three households at the 1845 census. Moses and Beate DelBanco still resided on the first floor with three of their children (aged 25 and 29), a female cook and a maid. Alexandre Philippe de Jonquieres still resided on the second floor with three of his children (aged 25 to 29), his sister-in-law Anna Hedevig de Jonquieres, her sister Christiane Sophie Høyer and two maids. Frederik Heinrich August Clausewitz /1790-1852(, who served as notarius publicus, resided on the third floor with his wife Ida Hedevig Christine (née Dahl), their eight-year-old daughter, a male servant, a female cook and a maid. Abraham Magnus resided on the ground floor with his wife Rebekke Magnus, their two children, his sister-in-law, a maid and two other women. Niels Svendsen, a new barkeeper, resided in the basement with his wife Hanne Cristine Lindhartdine Svendsen and their two daughters (aged 11 and 12).

=== 1646–1900 ===
The military officer P. F. Steinmann (1812–1894) resided in one of the apartments from 1847 to 1852. The civil servant and politician C. E. Bardenfleth (1807–1857) was among the residents in 1857. The actress and ballet dancer Betty Hennings (née Schnell; 1850–1939) resided in the ground-floor apartment from 1886 to 1890.

The writer Einar Christiansen (1861–1939) resided in the apartment on the third floor from 1891 until his death. He was editor of Illustreret Tidende from 1892 and artistic director of the Royal Danish Theatre from 1899.

=== 20th century ===
Johanne Eleonora Bojesen, a widow, resided on the first floor at the 1906 census. She lived there with her daughter Lovise Bojesen, a maid and a female cook. Otto Severin Bendtsen, a concierge, resided in the basement with his wife Laura Bendtsen and their 12-year-old son.

== Architecture ==
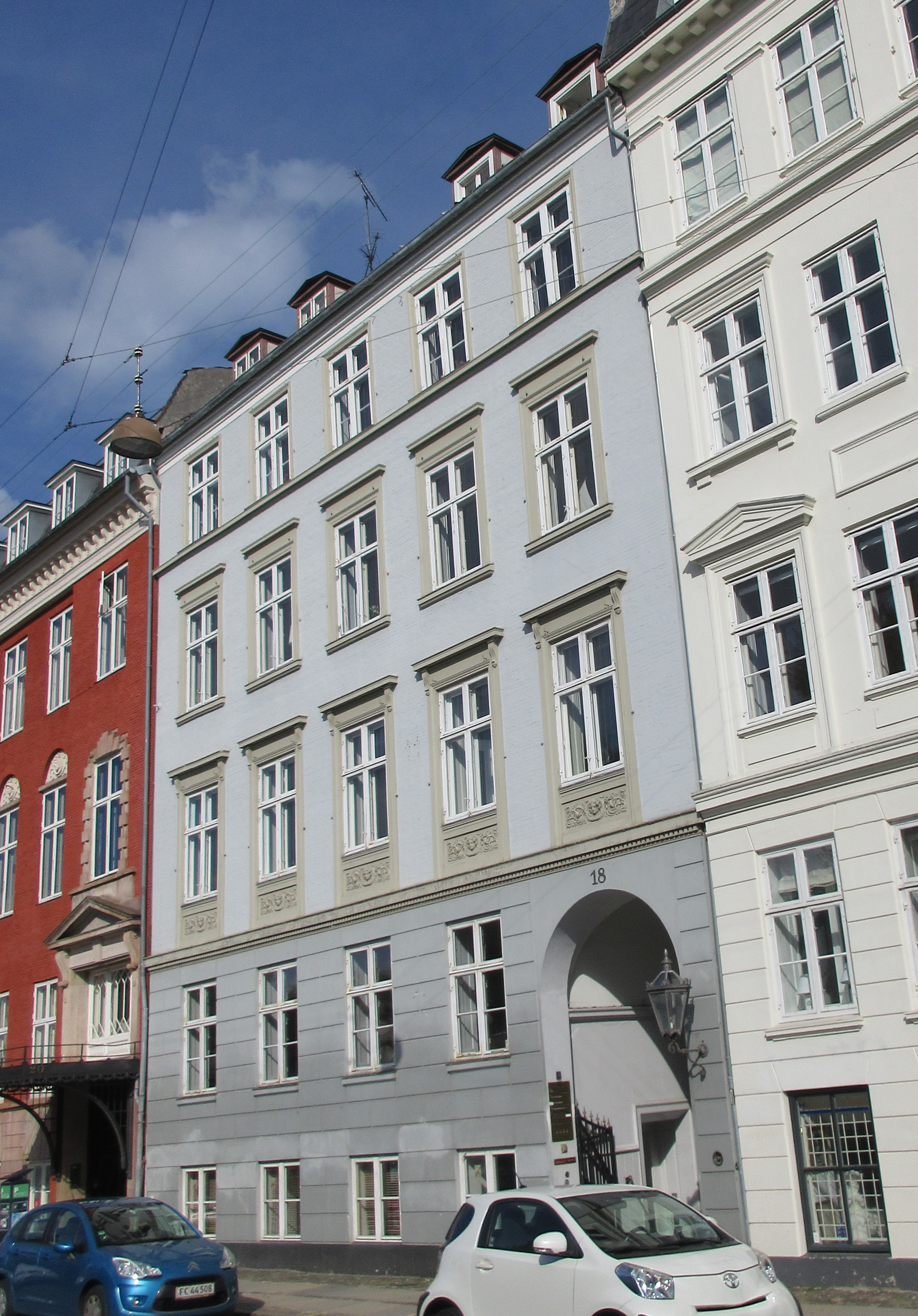
The facade of the building.

Kronprinsessegade 18 is constructed in four storeys over a raised cellar. The facade is horizontally divided by cornice bands below the first and fourth storey. There are relief decorations below the windows on the first floorstorey.

A perpendicular side wing extends from the rear side of the building and is again attached to a parallel cross wing at the bottom of the first courtyard. A gateway in the cross wing opens to the second courtyard. At the bottom of the second courtyard is a former wagon house.

The front wi ng, side wing and cross wing were kointly listed in the Danish registry of protected buildings and places in 1945. The wagon house is not part of the heritage listing.

== Today ==
The building is today owned by Ejd. Kronprinsessegade 18.

== Gallery ==
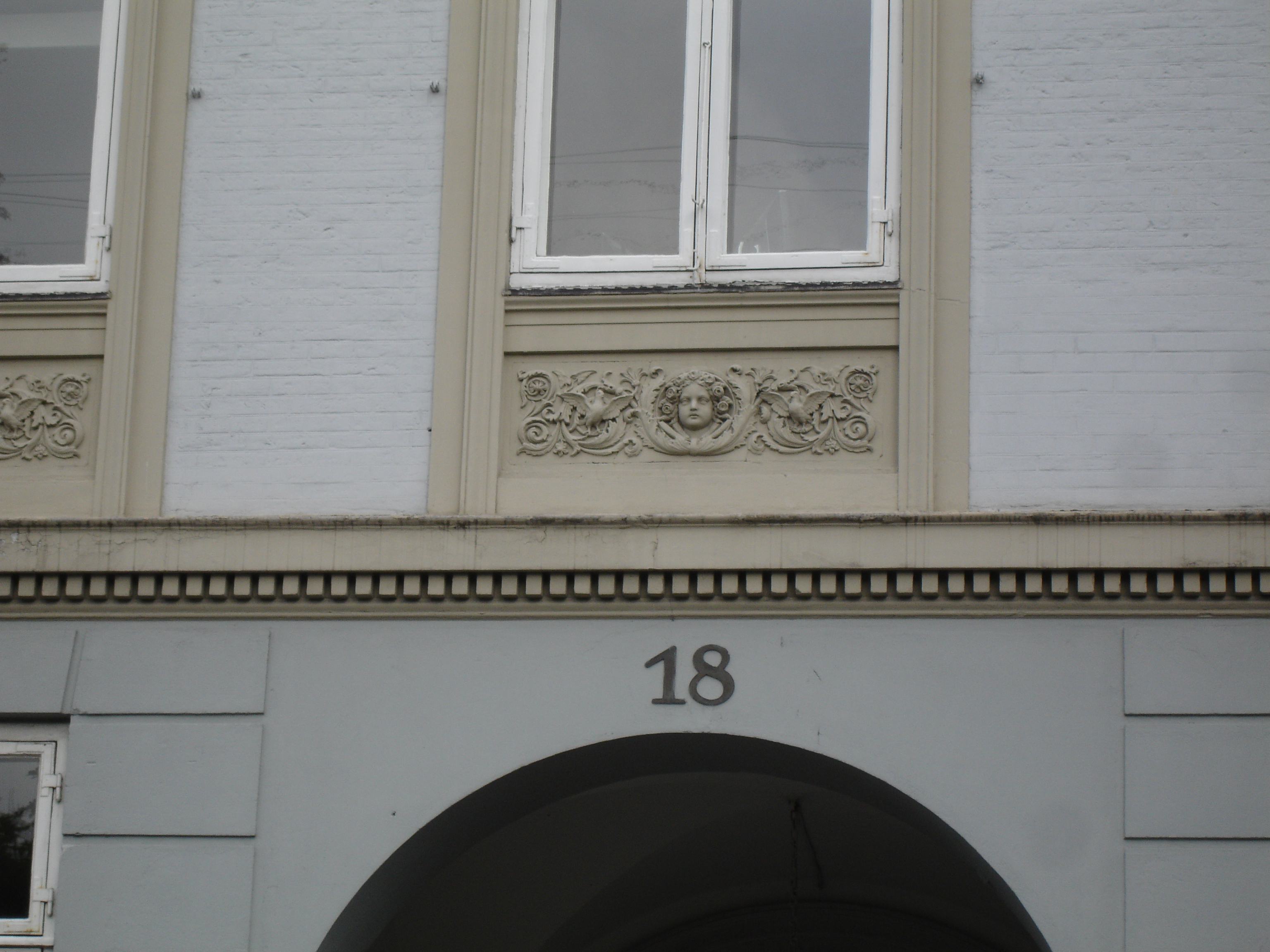
Detail from the facade.

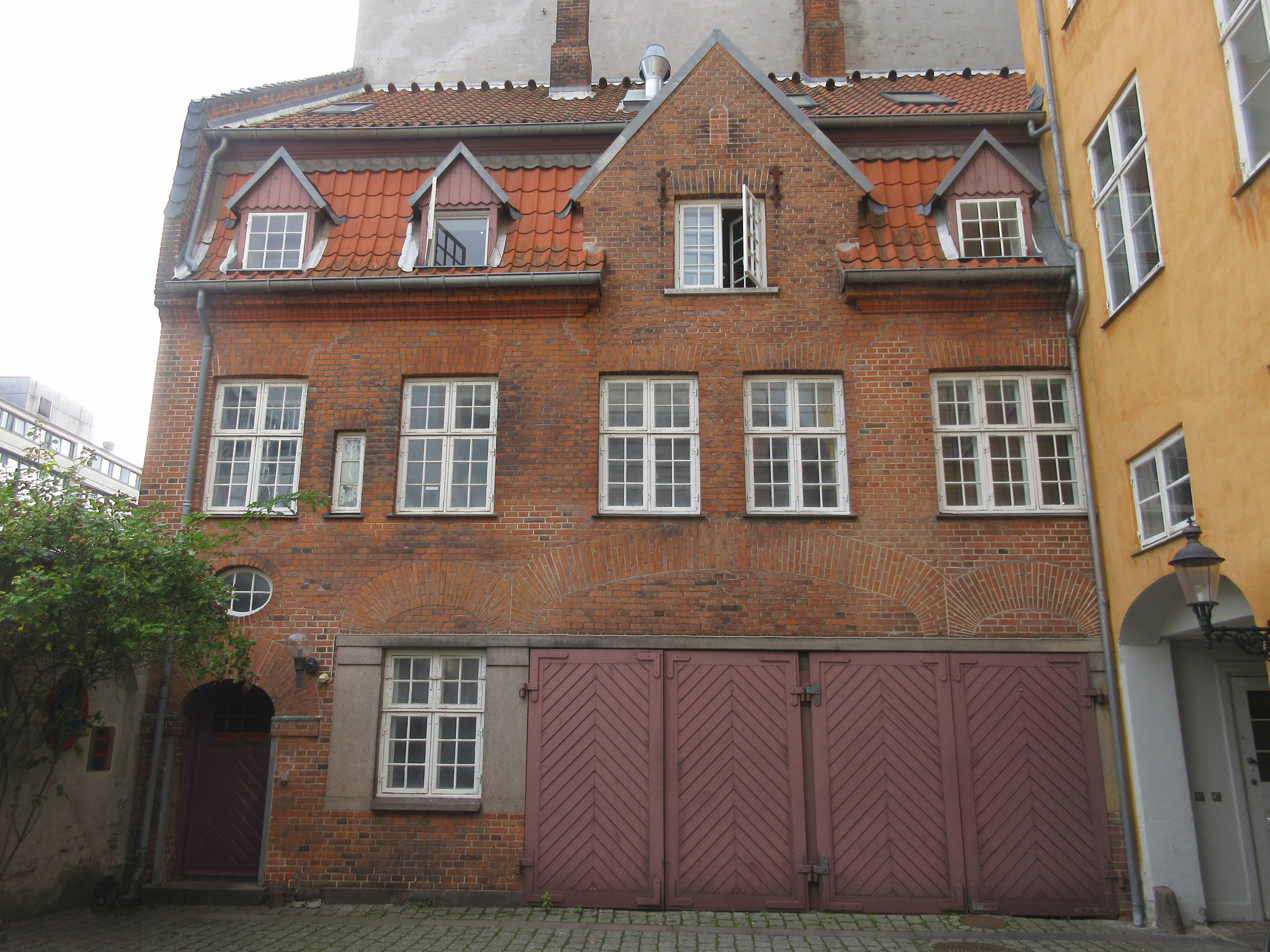
Building in the second courtyard.
