= Inger Marie Plum =

Danish businesswoman (1889–1965)

Inger Marie Plum (1889–1965) was a pioneering Danish businesswoman. She is remembered for assisting her older brother, Paul Munk Plum, in running his branch of the family's butter export business, P.M. Plum Export-Kompagni. When he died in 1934, she took the firm over at a time when it was unusual for women to run industrial companies. After the Second World War, she successfully headed the firm's extension into canning, including tinned meats. Shortly before her retirement in 1961, she arranged for the company to become a subsidiary of the canning firm Hafnia.

== Early life ==
Born on 9 April 1889 in Copenhagen, Inger Marie Plum was the daughter of the wholesaler Sophus Munk Plum (1847–1904) and his wife Antonie Christine Elisabeth Marie née Christiansen (1859–1910). She was the sixth of the family's 15 children. After completing her school education, when she was 21 she received a history teacher's diploma from N. Zahle's Seminary. Shortly afterwards, following the death of her father and then of her mother, she was left to care for her younger siblings for a number of years.

== Career ==
In the mid-1920s, she began to help her brother Paul who been active in his father's butter business until he sold it and started his own butter firm as PM Plum Eksport-Kompagni. After rapidly acquiring the necessary expertise, she became a member of the board in 1931. When her brother died in 1934, she took over the management of the company. Her qualifications were recognized and she was able to sit on the Stock Exchange's Butter Committee (Børsens Smørbedømmelsesudvalg) and the Butter Listing Committee (Smørnoteringsudvalget). After the Second World War, the company focused increasingly on canned meat. In 1960, she arranged for the company to become a subsidiary of the Hafnia canning concern. She withdrew from her business operations in 1962.

Plum went on to document her family history and their contribution to the Danish butter trade, especially in the Erhvervshistorisk Årbog (1964).

Inger Marie Plum died on 2 September 1965 in Copenhagen and is buried in Tibirke Cemetery.
