= March Revolution (Denmark) =

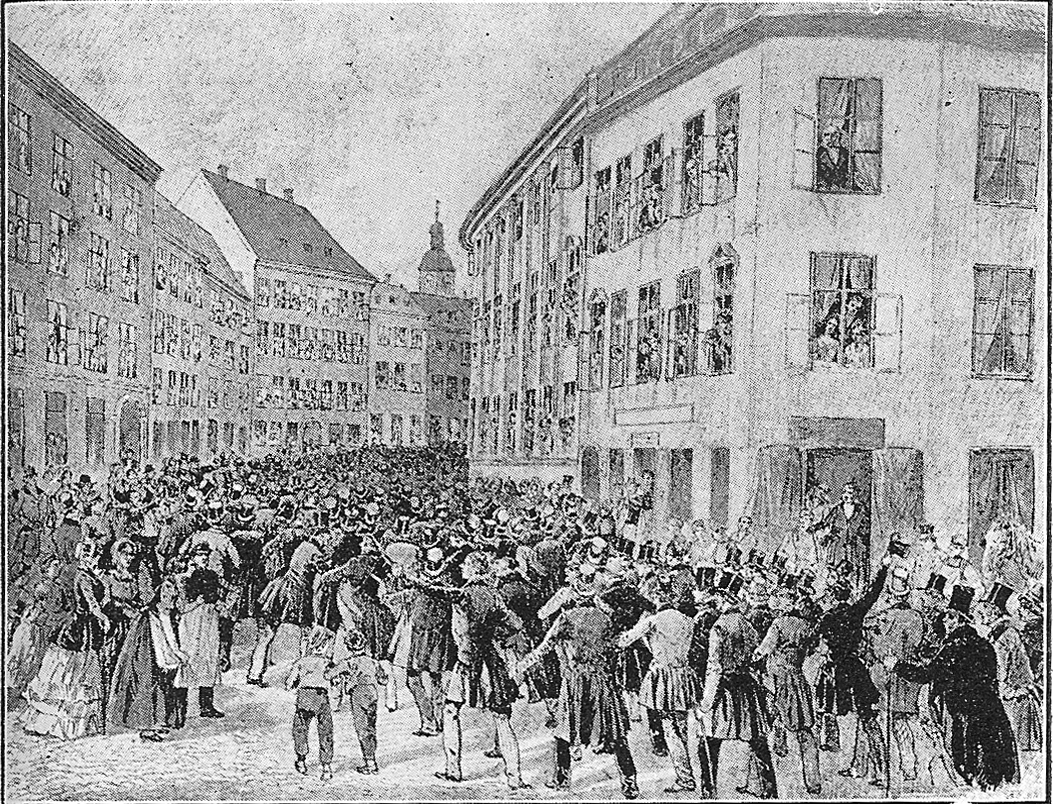
The march to Christiansborg on 21 March 1848. N.F.S. Grundtvig is depicted in the uppermost corner window to the right of the image.

The March Revolution in Denmark are the events of 1848 that ultimately led to the introduction of Danish constitutional monarchy and the Constitution of Denmark.

== Background ==
The February and March Revolutions of 1848 were a series of violent events that took place in several European countries (including France and Germany) and marked the emergence of steadily increasing support for democratic reform among the civic population in those countries. Denmark, which had long had a movement for constitutional reform, was affected by the fallout of these revolutions.

King Frederick VII (reigned 1848–63) was 39 years old at his coronation of 20 January 1848. As a prince he had had a somewhat unstable existence including two failed marriages, had no notable skills, and had engaged very little with state-related duties. This, and his lack of desire to shoulder the heavy work and responsibilities of an absolute monarch, meant that he was already open to the thought of a constitutional state.

After his ascension to the throne, he kept the previous ministers and made two new appointments to the Council of State: personally his childhood friend Carl Emil Bardenfleth, and, at his father Christian VIII's wish, Carl Moltke. A few days after the change of monarchs, the Gehejmestatsråd (loosely, "privy council") accepted the fundamentals of the draft constitution that had been under development during Christian VIII's last days. On 28 January 1848, a public announcement of a joint constitutional framework for the entirety of the Kingdom of Denmark was made. The plan was for public representation to consist of equal numbers of members from both the Kingdom proper (that is excluding the Duchies) and jointly the Duchies of Schleswig and Holstein, with meetings alternately taking place in these locations.

The National Liberal Party, which had through several methods demanded a constitution for the Kingdom and Schleswig immediately following the change of monarch, was very disappointed by the announcement. Specifically, they felt that giving the Kingdom's population of 1,300,000 and the Duchies' smaller population of 800,000 equal representation was a violation of the Danish people's rights. A larger movement grew in the Kingdom demanding a constitution for, geographically, Denmark up to the Eider river. The people of the Duchies were also displeased since the population thought it unthinkable that the Kingdom and the Duchies should be bound by a joint constitution.

== The Casino meeting ==
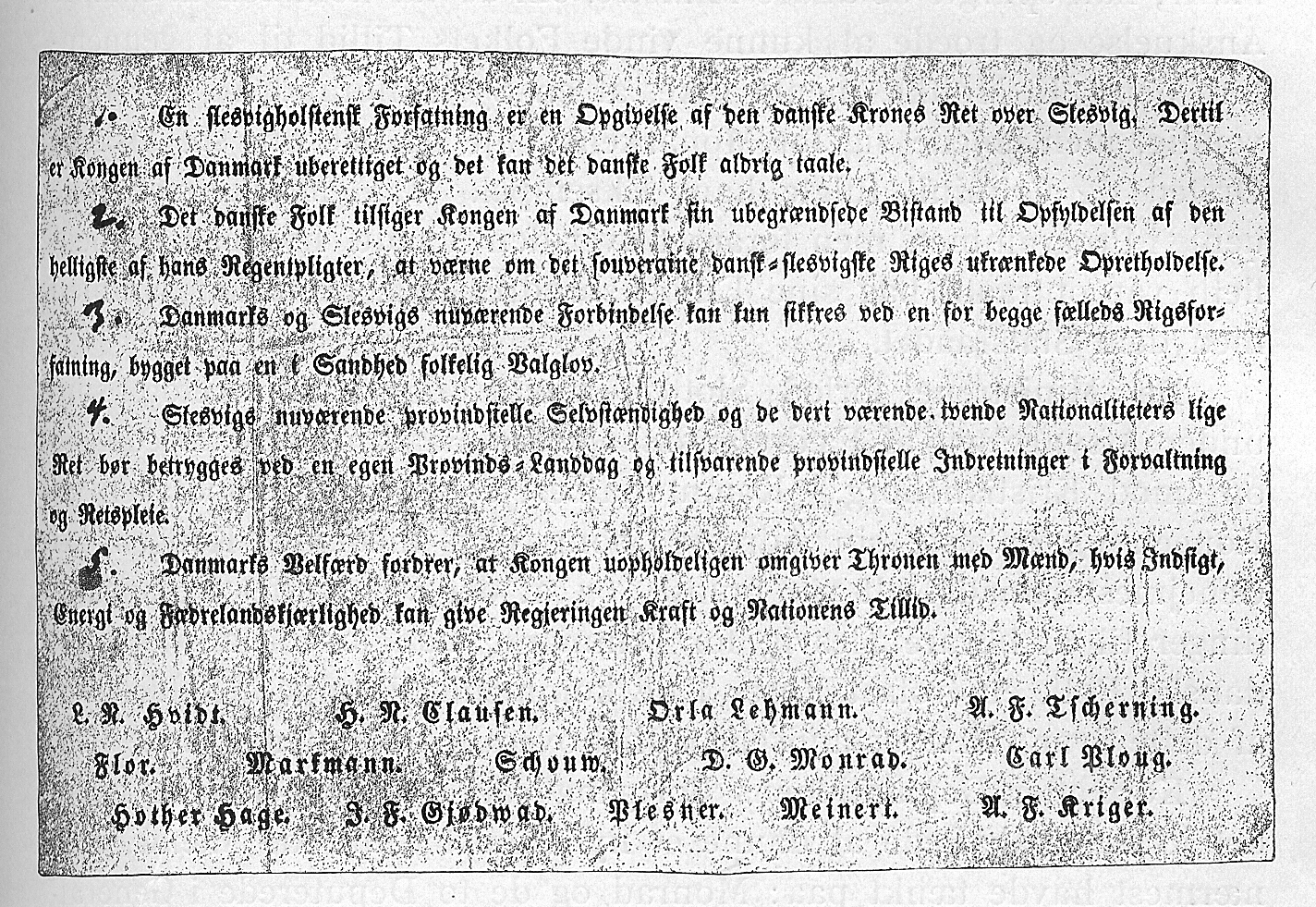
Carl Ploug's copy of the Casino Meeting's declaration.

On the morning of 20 March 1848, a message reached Copenhagen telling of a meeting held between representatives of Schleswig and Holstein two days earlier in Rendsburg. The representatives decided to dispatch a deputation to Frederick VII with demands including a free constitution, the unification of Schleswig with Holstein, and then Schleswig's joining of the German Confederation.

Off the back of these communications, the leading National Liberal politician Orla Lehmann announced and maintained that the Duchies were in open rebellion. Lehmann, along with party colleagues including Anton Frederik Tscherning, Henrik Nicolai Clausen, and Lauritz Nicolai Hvidt, announced a public meeting at the Casino Theatre at 2000 that same night (20 March). Additionally, Hvidt was tasked with calling the Borgerrepræsentation (English: People's Representation) to a meeting at 1800, to formally approve a declaration to the king with demands for system reform and a change of government. Lehmann wrote the introduction to the message, which read:

Ever merciful king!

Your advisors, which Your Majesty has inherited from your predecessor, are not in possession of the people's confidence, neither in Denmark proper nor in Schleswig and Holstein; the evermore prominent and sad fruits of their governmental system have undermined all hope that they should carry the wisdom and power to free the land. The decisive moment is approaching with a giant's steps. The state will dissolve itself if Your Majesty does not continuously surround your throne with men who are strong enough to meet the challenge and who can provide the government with energetic purpose and the nation with advice - men that could save Denmark's pride and lay the foundation for the land's freedom. We urge Your Majesty not to drive the nation into a spiral of sorrow.

The Representation accepted the declaration after a lengthy debate and decided to deliver it to the king the following day at 1100. Hvidt and Lehmann were consequently late to the Casino meeting, finally arriving at 2030 to the cheers of the 2,500-3,000 attendees. They presented the declaration and it was agreed to meet at Gammeltorv the next morning and accompany the Representation to the king.

== The march to Christiansborg ==
The next day (21 March), 15,000-20,000 people gathered at Gammeltorv (Copenhagen's main market square) around midday, from where they walked to Christiansborg to demand a new government. They arrived to find that earlier that morning Frederick VII had already, at the advice of his newly appointed minister Bardenfleth, dismissed his previous ministers. In order to attempt to keep Schleswig for Denmark, Bardenfleth had convinced the king to dismiss the unification-supporting government (which wished to keep both the Duchies).

== Formation of the government and lead-up to war ==
The following days were taken up by efforts to form a new government. Both Bardenfleth's attempts and several other suggestions, which involved a cabinet consisting mainly of representatives from the old political school mixed with a few liberal politicians, failed; eventually, on the morning of 22 March (and immediately before the arrival of the deputation from the Duchies), the former finance minister Adam Wilhelm Moltke managed to form a coalition now known as the Moltke I Cabinet or March Ministry. This consisted of very few old school figures, with the opposition gaining seats for Ditlev Gothard Monrad, Tscherning, Hvidt, and Lehmann. The National Liberals were in fact displeased with the cabinet but accepted the government based on the king's promise that he was now a constitutional monarch and would yield responsibility to the ministers.

The deputation from the Duchies then received an answer on March 24 (which also served as an announcement of the government's proposed program), which stated that the king refused to allow Schleswig to join the German Confederation. However, it did give Schleswig increased provincial independence and its own national day of celebration, with the king remarking that he wished to "strengthen [Schleswig's] unbreakable bond with Denmark through a joint, free constitution". As for Holstein, it was to have a separate, free constitution as an "independent German Confederate state". Before news of the answer could reach the Duchies, open rebellion had broken out in Holstein on March 23, and the conflicts became the Three Years' War of 1848–1850.

== See also ==
- Constitution of Denmark
