= Else Kai Sass =

Danish art historian (1912–1987)

Else Kai Sass née Brasen Bjernede (1912–1987) was a Danish art historian. After a period as a custodian at Thorvaldsens Museum, with her appointment as history of art professor at Aarhus University in 1954, she became the third woman in Denmark to hold a professorship. Over the following 25 years she was a key figure in the development of the history of art as a modern academic discipline, becoming a professor at the University of Copenhagen in 1967. Her books include Thorvaldsens portrætbuster, published in three volumes (1963–65) and still considered to be the standard work on the many portrait busts created by Bertel Thorvaldsen.

== Early life and family ==
Born in Copenhagen on 6 January 1912, Else Kai Brasen was the daughter of the clerk Valdemar Bjernede (born 1885) and Karen Margrethe Brasen (1878–1921). In March 1934, she married the painter Kai Louis Sass (1898–1957) with whom she had three children: Lotte (1934), Pernille (1938) and Karsten (1941). After matriculating from Rysensteen Gymnasium in 1930, she began studying art history at the University of Copenhagen. As a result of interruptions caused by stays in Paris and Rome and her marriage in 1934, she did not earn her master's degree until 1944.

== Career ==
While studying in the late 1930s, Sass embarked on a long-lasting relationship with Thorvaldsens Museum. From 1939 to 1942, she was employed as an art critic by the newspaper Nationaltidende where she reported on the art scene in Paris. In 1940, she wrote an expertise on the paintings of Abraham Wuchters, part of which was published in 1942 as Bidrag til en Karakteristik af Abraham Wuchters Alderdomsværk in Kunstmuseets aarsskrift (Contribution to a characterization of Abraham Wuchter's later work).

In 1945, Sass became a custodian at Thorvaldsens Museum until 1954 when she was appointed professor of art history at Aarhus University. Not only was she the first woman to become a professor of art history but she was the third woman in Denmark to have a professorship of any kind. The first two were Astrid Friis (appointed professor of history at the University of Copenhagen in 1945) and Dora Sigurdsson (appointed professor of singing at the Music Conservatory in 1952). While in Aarhus, she took a special interest in the art section of Aarhus Museum. With her earlier experience of custodianship and her interest in the history of art, she soon raised its status to one of Denmark's most important art museums.

In 1967, Sass accepted an offer of the history of art professorship at the University of Copenhagen where she remained until her retirement in 1978. During her 25 years of professorship in Aarhus and Copenhagen, she developed history of art as a modern academic discipline backed by the highly qualified staff she brought in. In 1970, she took the initiative to launch the journal HAFNIA: Copenhagen Papers in the History of Art which was published by the university until 1987. She was also active internationally as the Danish representative of Comité International d'Histoire de l'Art, organizing the 1978 colloquium in Copenhagen.

Among Sass's publications are the three-volume Thorvaldsens Portrætbuster (1963–65) and a new edition of Kunstforståelse - maleri (Understanding Art - Painting), published in 1967.

Else Kai Sass died in Copenhagen on 16 December 1987 and was buried in the cemetery at Tibirke Cemetery near Tisvilde.
