= Bredgade 38 =

Neoclassical property in Copenhagen, Denmark

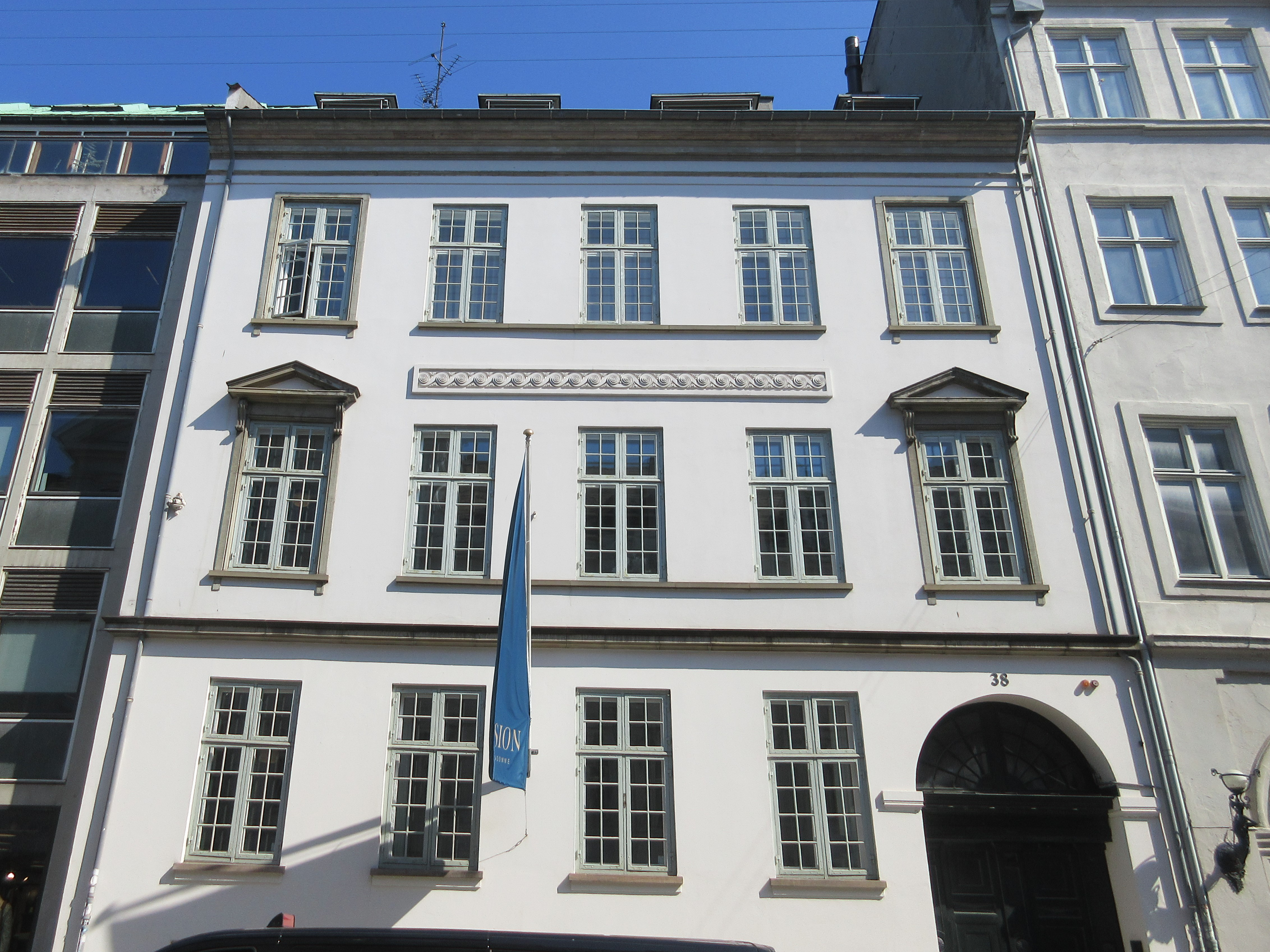
- Interactive map of the Bredgade 38 area

General information
- Architectural style: Neoclassical
- Location: Copenhagen, Denmark
- Coordinates: 55°41′2.11″N 12°35′24.47″E
- Completed: 1792

Design and construction
- Architect: Andreas Hallander

Bredgade 38 is a Neoclassical property in the Frederiksstaden neighborhood of central Copenhagen, Denmark. The building was listed in the Danish registry of protected buildings and places in 1951. Notable former residents include the naval officer Carl Wilhelm Jessen and businessman Emil Vett.

== History ==
=== 18th century ===
The site was originally part of the gardens of Sophie Amalienborg. It was later part of the garden of the Bernstorff Mansion. Bernstorff's property was listed in the new cadastre of 1756 as No. 71. It was marked as No. 287 on Christian Gedde's map of St. Ann's East Quarter. The property now known as Bredgade was later referred to as No. 71 OO 4.

=== Arctander and the new building ===
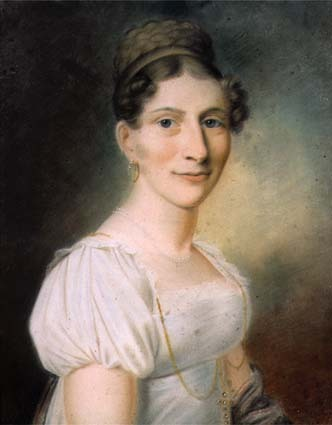
Alette Christine Arctander

The present building on the site was built in 1801–02 by carpenter and master builder Andreas Hallander. In the new cadastre of 1806, the property was listed as No. 175 in St. Ann's East Quarter. It was owned by Hans Nicolai Arctander (1757-1837) at that time. He lived in the building with his wife Agneta Birgitte Brammer and nine children. The eldest daughter Anna Alette Christine Arctander would later marry Andreas Erich Heinrich Ernst, Count von Bernstorff (1791-1834).

One of Arctander's tenants, Carl Wilhelm Jessen, a captain in the Royal Danish Navy, was among the residents of the building from 1804 to 1808. He would later serve as governor of the Danish West Indies. Hans Wilhelm v. Warnstedt, who had previously served as director of the Royal Danish Theatre, resided in the building in 1812-1817.

The businessman Hermann Christian Müffelmann was also among the residents of the building. He was married to Augusta Tutein. In 1809, he also bought a country house at Prinsessestien in Kongens Lyngby. From May 1825 to 1830, Christian Winther served as tutor for some of their eix children.

=== 1840–1870s ===
The naval officer Christian Zahrtmann (da) resided in the building from 1839 to 1853.

At the 1840 census, No, 175 was home to 33 residents in five households. Ferdinand Christian Fürchtegott Bauditz, a colonel, chamberlain and marshall for Prince Ferdinand, resided on the ground floor with his wife Caroline v. Bauditz, four of their children (aged 13 to 31) and two maids. Christian Christopher Zahrtmann resided on the first floor with his wife Sophie Elisabeth Zahrtmann (née Donner), their two daughters (aged 10 and 12), a governess, a male servant and three maids. Adolph Frederik Tutein, a businessman (grosserer) and French vice consul, resided on the second floor with his wife Elise Vilhelmine Tutein (née Voss), their two sons (aged two and six), three maids and two lodgers. The lodgers were the widow Susanne Fenwich and her 26-year-old daughter Merry Fenwich. Andreas Felumb, a shoemaker who also served as the building's concierge, resided in the basement with his wife Christiane Margrethe Felumb and their one-year-old son. Niels Pedersen Harpsøe, a beer seller (øltapper), resided in the basement with his wife Ane Christine Harpsøe, a 35-year-old unmarried daughter and one maid.

At the 1845 census, No. 175 was home to 34 residents in four households. Ferdinand Bauditz (1778-1849), who had now been promoted to major-general, resided on the ground floor with his wife, four unmarried children (aged 17 to 30), two male servants and two maids. Christian Christopher and Sophie Elisabeth Zahrtmann resided on the first floor with their three daughters (aged one to 16), a male servant, a coachman, two maids and a female cook. Carl Ewald (1789-1866), the king's Adjutant general, resided on the second floor with his wife Frederikke Amalie Ewald (née Rosenstand Gorsti), three unmarried daughters (aged 19 to 32), one male servant and two maids. Andreas Felumb (1806-), a master shoemaker, resided in the basement with his wife and four children.

The painter Frederik Christian Lund resided in the building in the mid-1850s. The lawyer and politician Carl Christian Vilhelm Liebe resided there in 1861-63.

The businessman Elias B. Muus lived in the building from 1857. His company B. Muus & Co. was established on the site.

The teacher Ludvig Trier (1837-1911) lived in an apartment on the ground floor until 1874. He prepared Denmark's first female medical doctor Nielsine Nielsen for her later studies. In her diary, she describes her first meeting with him in the apartment on 22 June 1874 at 5 A.M.:"

"This meeting became of crucial significance to my study and my life—his mother had just passed away but he still occupied the comfortable apartment they had shared in Bredgade. It was in his small study facing the courtyard that he resided. A small room full of books with school desk and wax-cloth sofa, small-barred windows and greenish glass with dusty cacti—and an anteroom full of book shelves."

=== Seligmann ===
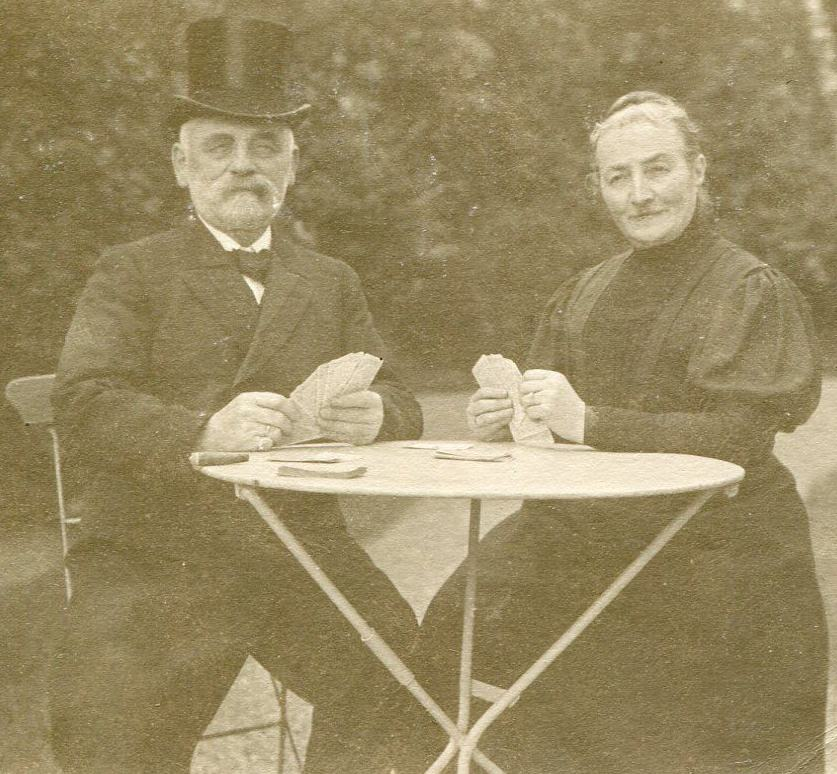
Adolph and Viga Seligmann

The businessman (grosserer) Adolf Seligmann (1839-1912) purchased the property in around 1874. His property was home to 37 residents in six households at the 1885 census. Seligmann resided on the first floor with his wife Viga Seligmann, their six children (aged seven to 16), two male servants, a bonne and two maids. Emil Vett, another businessman, resided on the second floor with his wife Caroline Vett, their five children (aged five to 13) and three maids. Henriette Holm, a widow, resided on the ground floor with her 51-year-old daughter Constance Holm and three maids. Charlotte Bergstrøm and Louise Bunken, two unmarried women in their 50s, resided in the garret with two maids. Christian Posgren Pedersen, a master shoemaker, resided in the basement with his wife Caroline Pedersen and the shoemaker Johan Pehrson (employee). Hans Carl Hansen, a building painter (malersvend), resided in the basement with his wife Marie Hansen.

Seligmann's former company A. Seligmann & Co. was still based in the building in 1910.

=== Bruun ===
In 1928, Bredgade 38 was acquired by supreme court attorney H.H. Bruun who from then on ran his law firm from the premises. It was from 1944 continued by his son Jonas Bruun under his own name. It moved after merging with Hjejle Gersted Mogensen under the name Bruun & Hjejle in 2009.

== Architecture ==
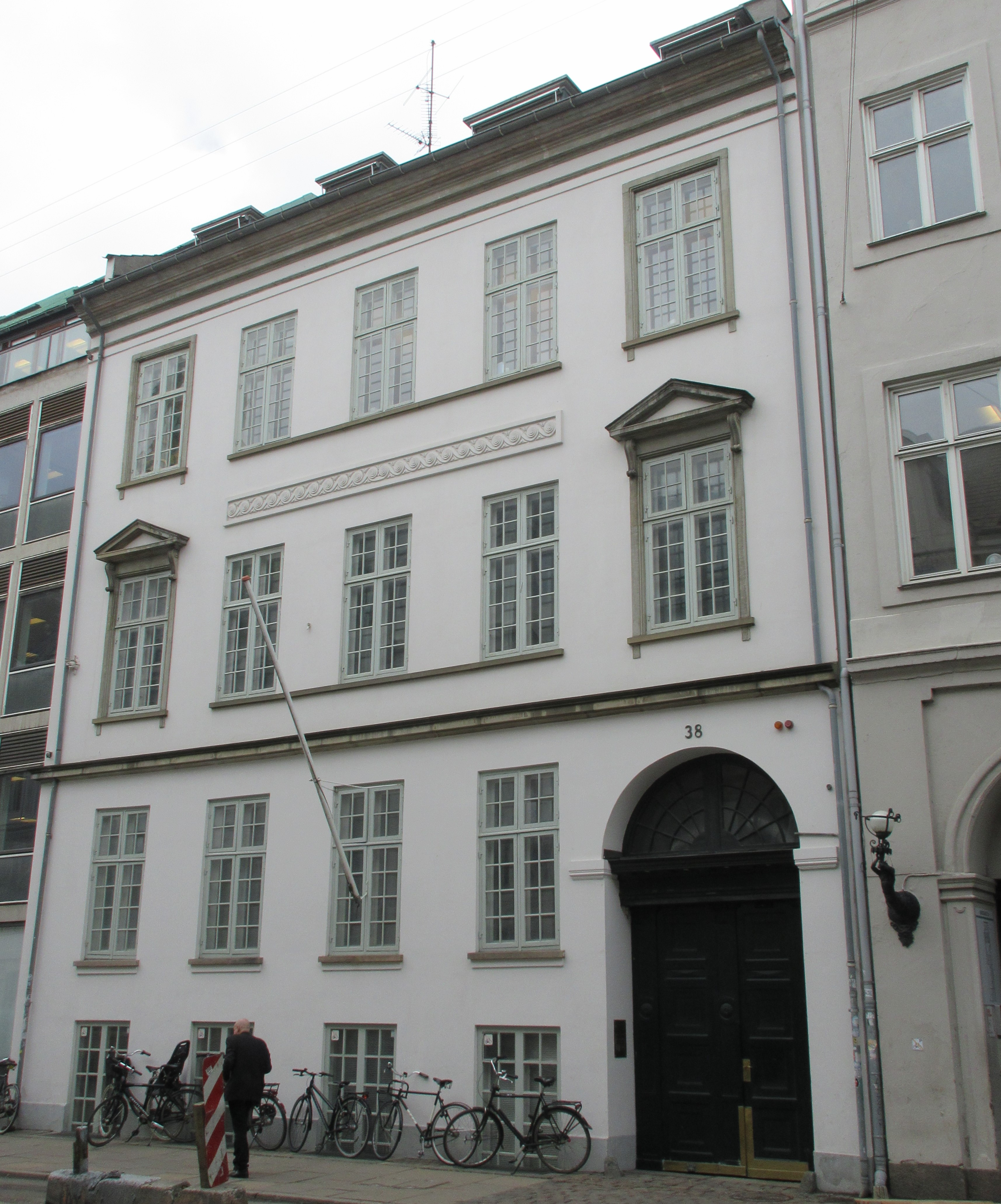
Bredgade 38

Bredgade 38 consists of a three-storey building towards the street, a six-bay perpendicular side wing which extends from the rear side of the building and a three-bay rear wing. The building towards the street is five bays wide. The outer windows on the first and second floor are accented by sandstone frames and the ones on the first floor are topped by triangular pediments. There is a frieze between the three central windows on the first and second floor.

== Today ==
In 2017, COPU acquired the building. It was later converted into high-end apartments.
