= Jonas Bruun =

Danish supreme court attorney

Jonas Bruun (3 July 1911 – 25 November 1977) was a Danish supreme court attorney. Bruun was made a partner in his father's law firm in 1940 and continued it alone under his own name from 1944. The law firm Jonas Bruun was based at Bredgade 38 in Copenhagen. It merged with Hjejle Gersted Mogensen under the name Bruun & Hjejle in 2009.

== Early life and education ==
Bruun was born on 3 July 1911 in Copenhagen, the son of lawyer Hans Henrik Bruun (1884–1954) and Elisabeth Poulsen (1887–1960). He matriculated from Sorø Academy in 1928 and earned his law degree from the University of Copenhagen in 1937.

== Career ==
Bruun was made a partner in his father's law firm after briefly in 1939–40 serving as a secretary in the Ministry of Foreign Affairs. He was licensed for landsretten in 1942 and ten years later also for the Supreme Court. He assisted the Attorney General for approximately 10 years starting in 1944. On his father's death in 1954, he was left as the sole owner of the law firm. He was maonly active as a prominent legal consultant for a wide range of major Danish companies. He was for many years president or board member of A/S Højgaard & Schultz (from 1958: A/S Contractor), A/S Lemvigh-Müller & Munck and the Royal Porcelain Factory. In his capacity of president of De forenede Vagtselskaber, he played a central role in its merger with Det danske Rengøringsselskab under the name ISS A/S and was also president of this company in the early 1970s.

Bruun was interested in the arts and was for many years involved in the management of C. L. Davids Fond og Samling, Den holbergske stiftelse Tersløsegård, Knud Højgårds Fond and the Danish Museum of Arts & Crafts. He was also active in a number of charities, including Vemmetofte kloster and Foreningen til Fremme af Blindes Selvvirksomhed.

== Personal life and legacy ==
Bruun was on 14 May 1941 married to lady-in-waiting and later private secretary of Queen Ingrid, Sybille Malvina Lonny, Countess Reventlow (24 August 1912 – 21 August 1998), a daughter of d. af ambassador Eduard Reventlow (1883–1963) and Else Bardenfleth (1884–1964), in Christiansborg Chapel.

Bruun was created a Knight in the Order of the Dannebrog in 1962 and a Commander in the Order of the Dannebrog in 1975. He died on 25 November 1977 and is buried in Tibirke Cemetery at Tisvildeleje.

Bruun's law firm was based at Bredgade 38 in Copenhagen. It merged with Hjejle Gersted Mogensen under the name Bruun & Hjejle in 2009.
