= Tibirke Church =

Coordinates: 56°2′29.92″N 12°6′23.84″E

- Tibirke Kirke
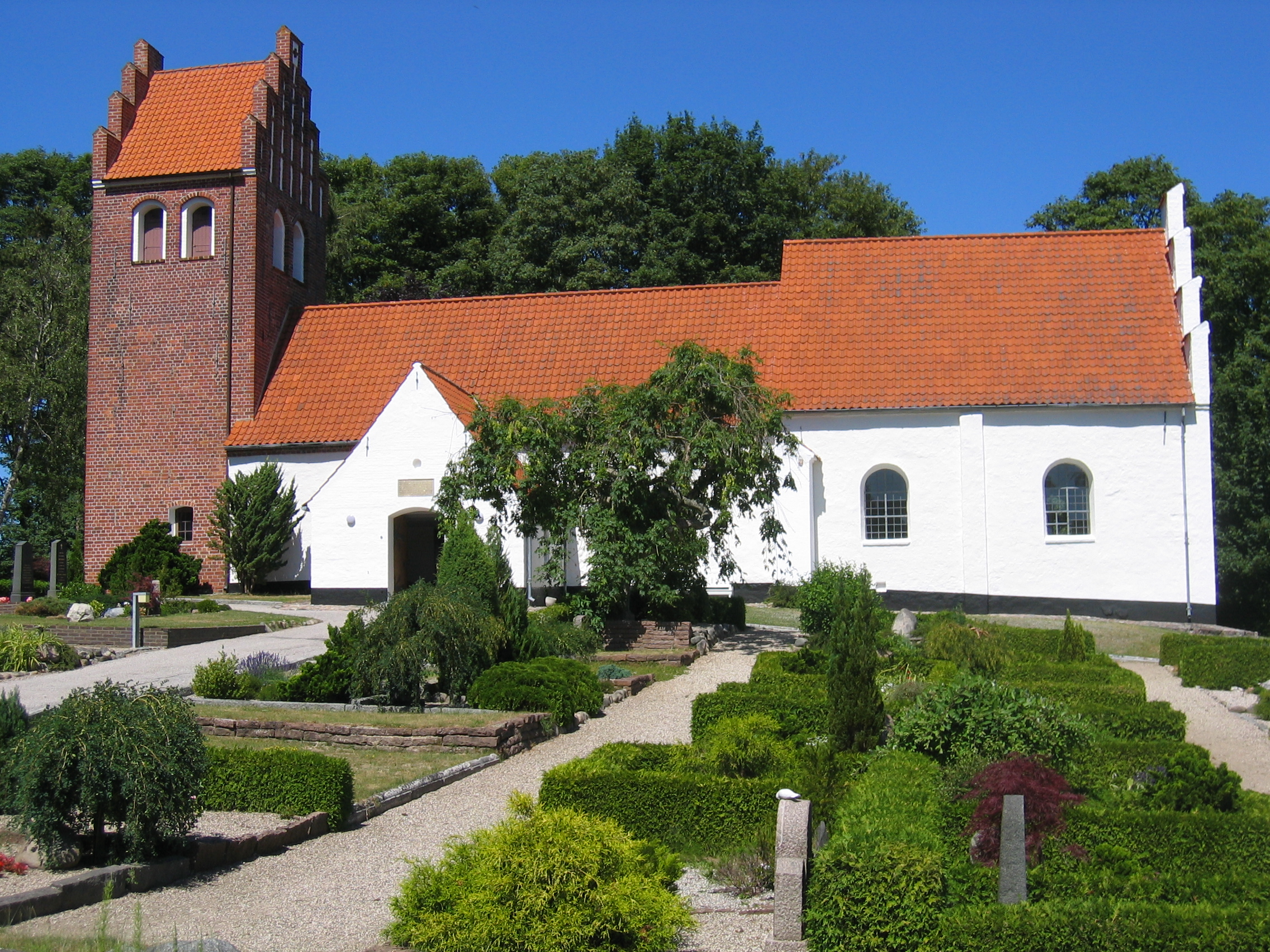
- Tibirke Church
- Location: Tibirke, Gribskov Municipality, Denmark
- Denomination: Church of Denmark

Architecture
- Architectural type: Romanesque style
- Years built: 13th century

Administration
- Diocese: Diocese of Helsingør
- Parish: Tibirke Sogn

Tibirke Church (Danish: Tibirke Kirke), originally located in the long-gone village of Tibirke, is a Church of Denmark parish church located close to Tisvildeleje, Gribskov Municipality, some 60 km (37 mi) northwest of Copenhagen, Denmark.

== History ==
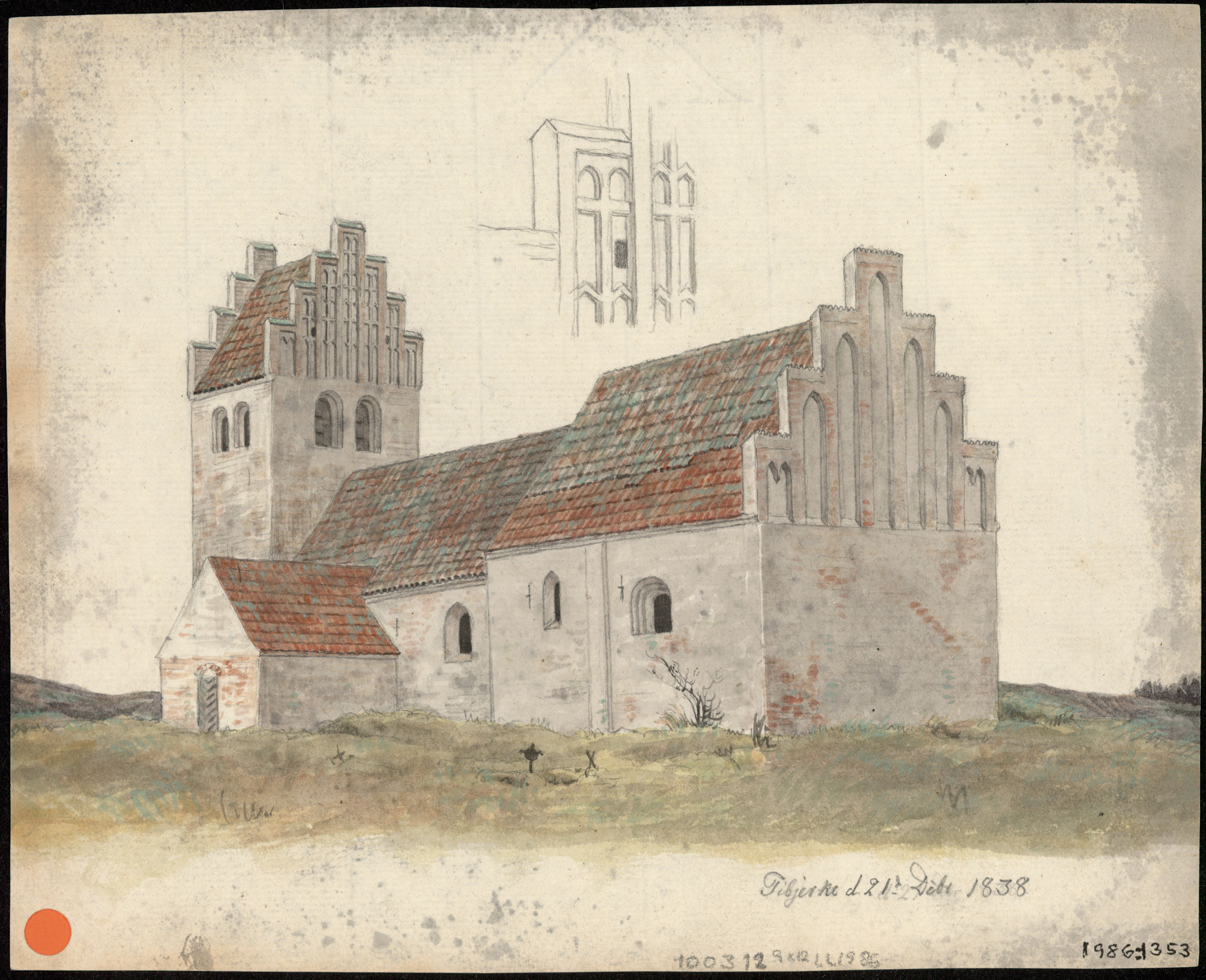
Tibirke Church in 1838.

The church is first mentioned in around 1210 when the Tithe right was transferred from the Bishops of Roskilde to Æbelholt Abbey. A parish priest is mentioned in 1301. In 1567, Tibirke was home to 16 tithe-paying households. Towards the end of the century, drifting sands began to bury the fields and farms in the area. In 1612, Tibirke Parish was so hit hard by sand drifts that the church was annexed to Vejby. In 1732, Vejby was granted royal permission to provide economic support for the dilapidated Tibirke Church.

In 1717, Tibirke Church was almost completely covered by sand and it was under consideration to be torn down and have the building materials shipped off to Greenland. However, King Frederick IV ultimately decided to combat the sand and the church was instead excavated.

On 1 May 1720, Vejby and Tibirke churches were instead transferred to Frederiksborg Cavalry District. By 1872, Tibirke Church had been sold to the local tithe-payers. On 1 April 1914, it was turned into a self-owned institution.

== Architecture ==
The original Romanesque church consisted of a granite nave just two bays long, a chancel and an apse. In the late 14th century, the nave was extended westwards. The present chancel replaced the original one in the second half of the 15th century. It is of the same length as the nave but wider and taller, indicating that it was originally intended as the first stage of a complete renewal of the building. The tower was added in the 17th century. The porch on the south side of the church replaced an older one in 1754.

== Furnishings ==
The altarpiece dates from 1475 and was carved in Lübeck or by a Lübeck master in Denmark. It was damaged during the sand drift. In 1740, it was therefore replaced by a painting of the Last Supper painted in 1738 by J.F. Kriegel. The old altarpiece was initially left behind the painting but later transferred to first Frederiksborg Castle 1864) and then the National Museum of Denmark (1784). In 1911 and again in 1931, Tibirke Church requested to have it returned. Between 1836 and 1839, the old altarpiece was finally restored and returned to the church. The painting of the Last Supper was subsequently moved to the north wall of the chancel. The Romanesque baptismal font is made of granite. The pulpit is from 1739 and was created by the Copenhagen-based wood carver Christian Holfelt.

== Gallery ==
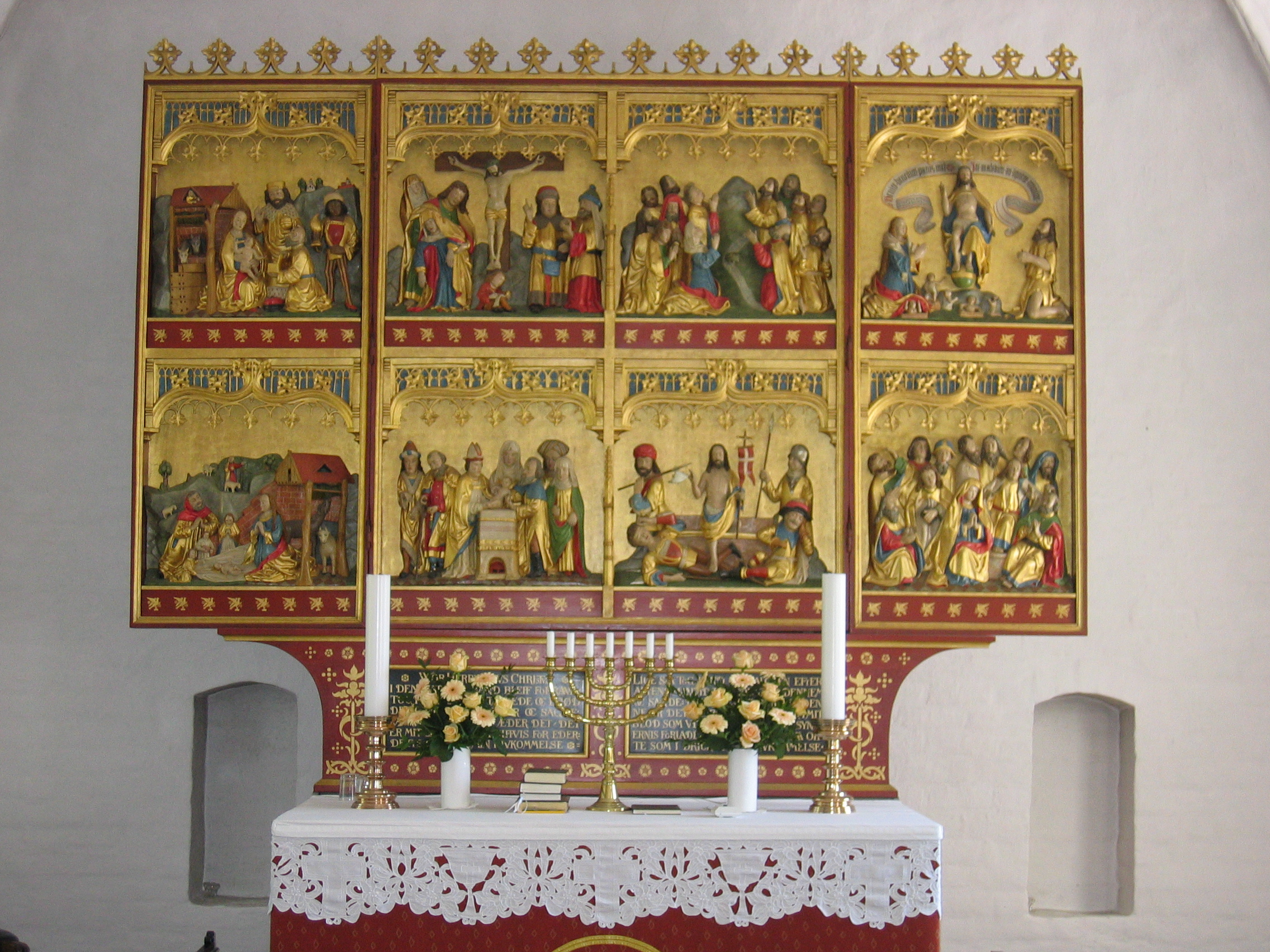
Altarpiece

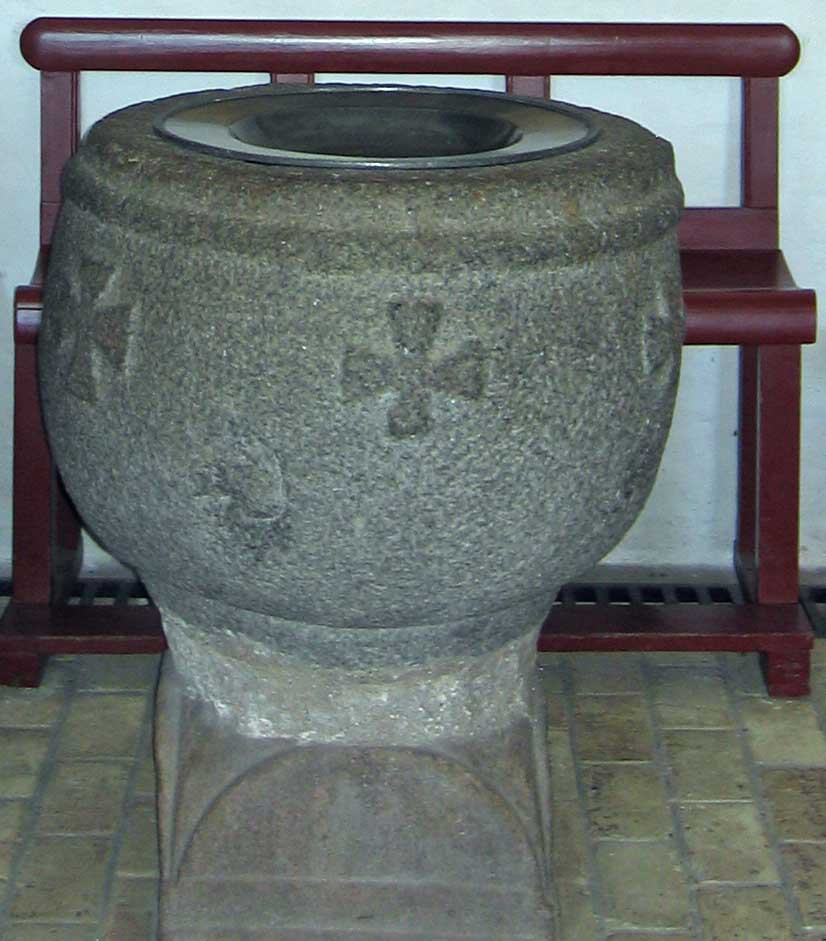
Baptismal font

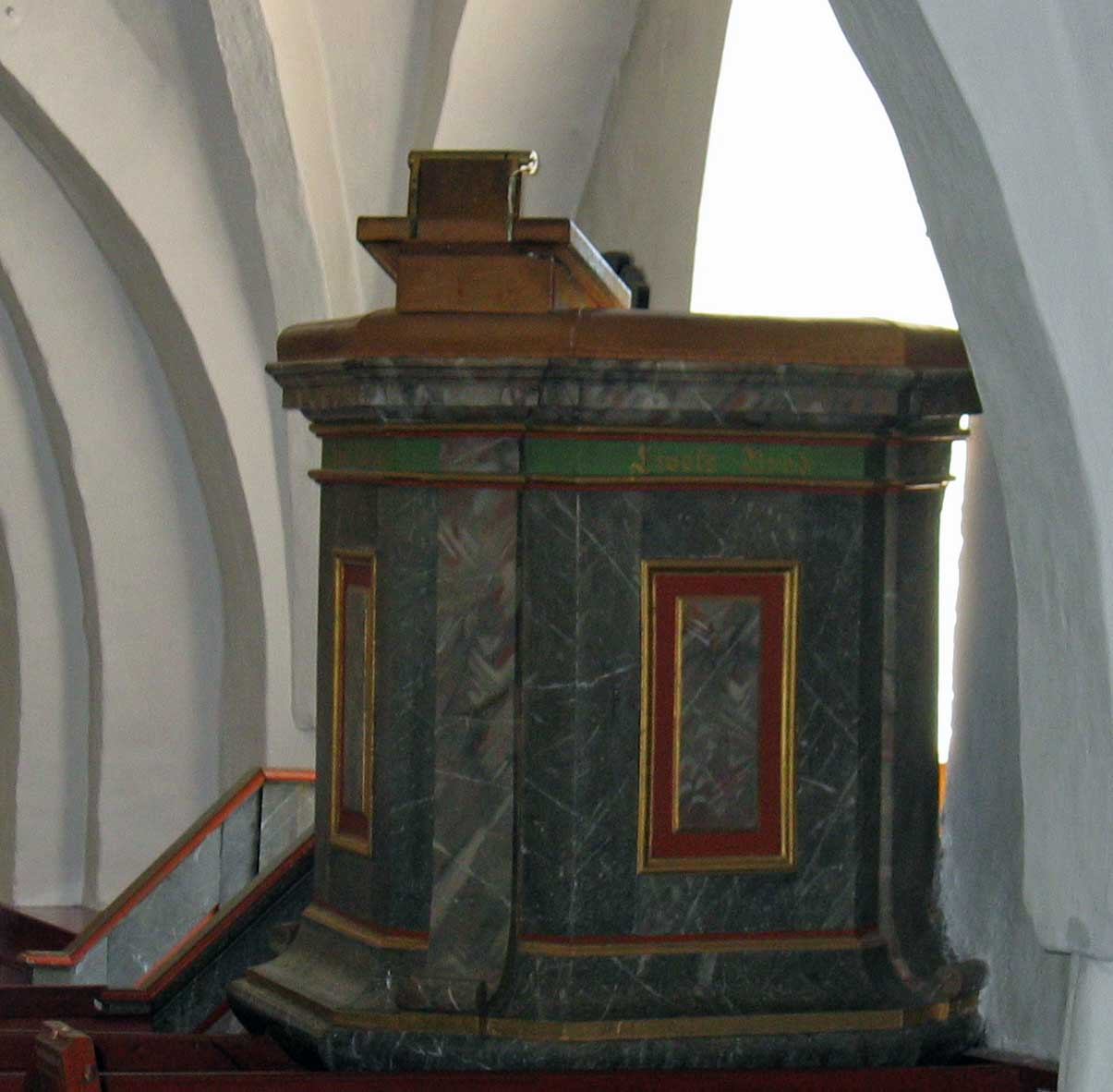
Pulpit

== Graveyard ==
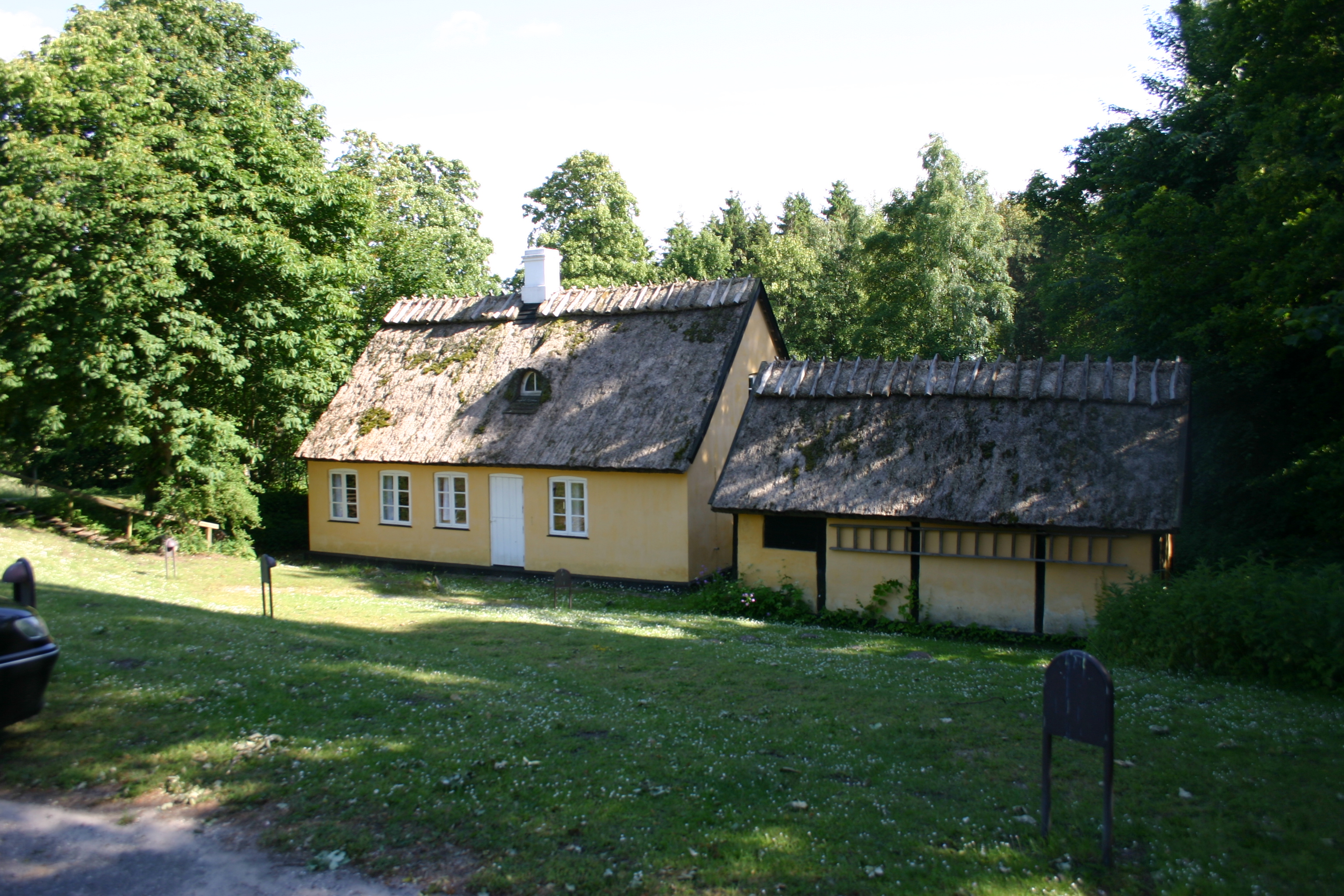
Gretely.

The church is surrounded by a fairly large graveyard. A small thatched parish house is located to the south of the church. The building is known as Gretely. Notable burials include:

- Else Alfelt, painter
- Vibeke Alfelt, painter and graphic artist
- Peter Augustinus, businessman and philanthropist
- Ivar Bentsen, architect
- Jonas Bruun, lawyer
- Eigil Hirschspring Brünniche, art historian
- Godfred Christensen, painter
- Axel Richard Christensen, actor, director, composer
- Thorkel Dahl, architect
- Sys Gauguin, painter, illustrator and writer
- Peter Hertz, art historian and museum inspector
- Peter Hvidt, architect
- Hans Carl Jensen, painter and illustrator
- Kaare Klint, sculptor
- Helle Klint Bentsen
- Freddy Koch, actor
- Margot Lander, ballet dancer
- Inger Marie Plum, businesswoman
- Knudåge Riisager, composer
- Else Kai Sass, historian
- William Scharff, painter
- Grethe Sønck, actor
- Clara Tybjerg, Supreme Court justice
- Herman Vedel, painter

== Cultural references ==
Tibirke Church was used as a location in the 2003 film Til højre ved den gule hund.
