= Tibirke =

Locality in Gribskov Municipality, Denmark

Coordinates: 56.0417°N 12.1067°E

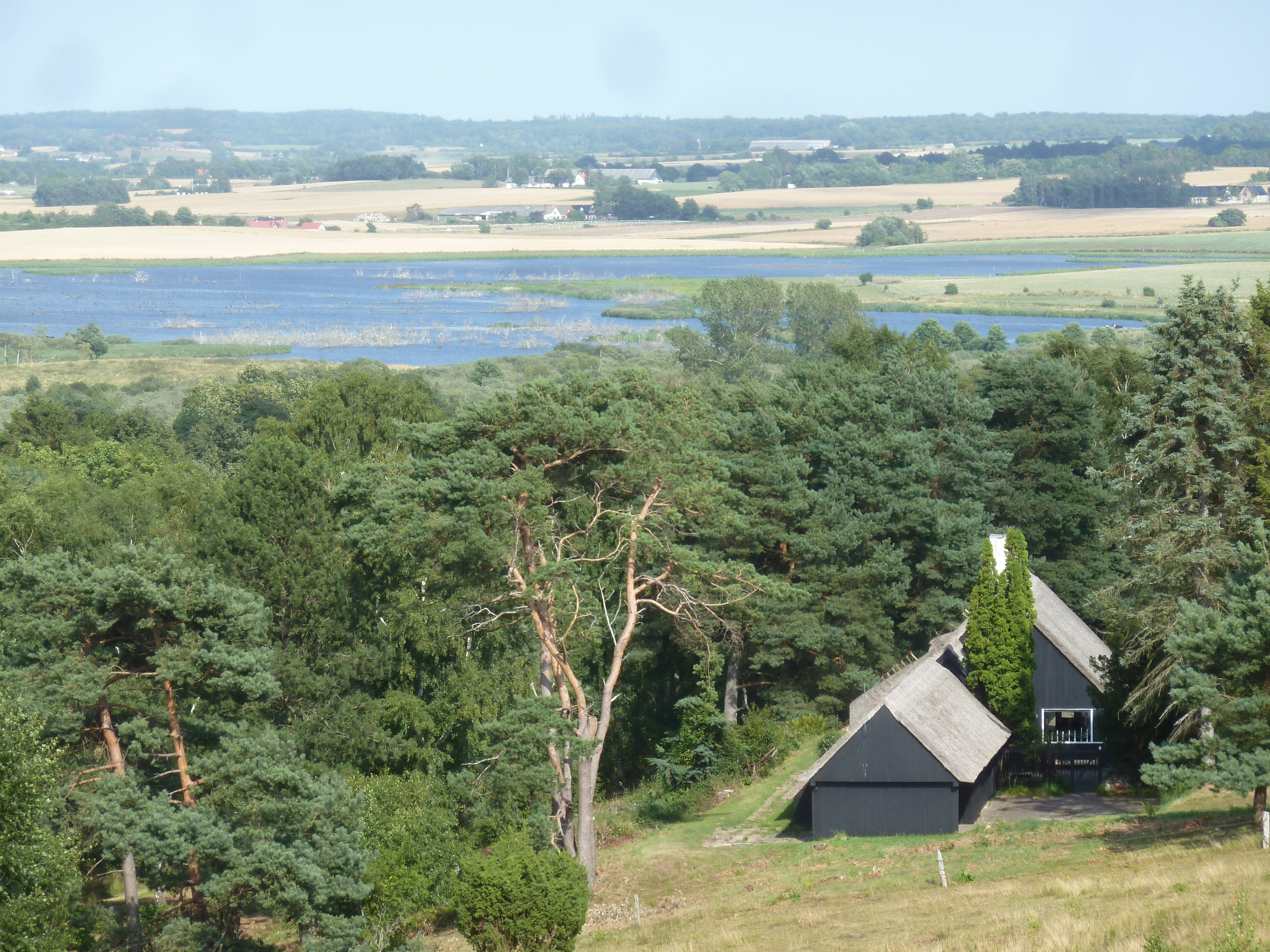
Tibirke Bakker

Tibirke is a locality in Gribskov Municipality located between Tisvilde and Tisvildeleje to the north, Tisvilde Hegn to the west, and Arresø to the south, approximately 60 kilometres north of Copenhagen, Denmark. It includes the protected area Tibirke Bakker (hills), Tibirke Lunde (grove), Tibirke Sand (sand) and the village Tibirke.

== Location ==
Tibirke Sand has an area of two square kilometres. It is bounded by Frederiksværksvej and Tisvilde Hegn to the north, Arresø to the east and south and by the municipal border with Halsnæs Municipality to the west.

== History ==
=== Ancient history ===
Remains of two ancient roads at Tibirke Ellemose show evidence of early human activity in the area. One is from 2,800 BC, making it Denmark's oldest known road construction. The other, which consists of a series a step stones and a cobbled section of road, dates from the pre-Roman Iron Age.

=== 13th to 19th century ===
The first references to the name Tibirke are from 1208–14. The name comes from ti, meaning god, and birki birch grove. The village of Tibirke was covered in sand and abandoned when the area was hit by sand drift in the 16th century. The farmers moved to Tisvilde. In 1717, Tibirke Church was almost completely covered by sand and it was under consideration to tear it down and ship the building materials off to Greenland. However, king Frederick IV ultimately decided to combat the sand and the church was instead excavated.

=== 20th century ===
In the beginning of the 1900s, a mixture of artists, writers and wealthy citizens built the first houses in Tibirke Hills. The architect and archaeologist Ejnar Dyggve created a master plan for the area in 1916 and he also designed a number of summer houses that was built in the hills over the following years. Many other leading architects of the time also designed summer houses in the area, including Mogens Clemmensen, Mogens Lassen, Ivar Bentsen and Vilhelm Lauritzen. Among the residents were the writer Johannes V. Jensen. In 1928, mockingly, Poul Henningsen referred to Tibirke Bakker as "Snob Hills". Tibirke Lunde saw a similar development.

== Literature ==
- Dahl, Thorkel: Huse i Tibirke Bakker. Kunstakademiets Arkitektskoles Forlag. ISBN 9788770980005
