= Hermann Christian Müffelmann =

Hermann Christian Müffelmann (19 December 1775 – 27 May 1848) was a Danish businessman. He served as director of the Danish Asiatic Company.

== Early life ==
Müffelmann was born on 19 December 1775 in Copenhagen, the son of sugar master Johann Dietrich Muffelmann and Maria Elisabeth née Hellebart. He was baptized on 25 Mayh in St. Peter's Church.

== Career ==
1804–1805, Müffelmann Travelled to Danish India as Supercargo on the private ship Neptunus. On 7 June 1806, Müffelmann was granted citizenship as a wholesaler (grosserer) in Copenhagen. From 1812, he owned substantial property in Copenhagen. He was elected as one of the city's 32 Men. On 20 June 1833, he was elected as one of the directors of the Danish Asiatic Company. He remained in this position until April 1841.On 8 March 1841, he was elected as bookkeeper for Kjøbenhavns Brandforsikring (Copenhagen Fire Insurance Company=.

He served as curator for St. Peter's Church and managed the means of St Peter's Gril School.

== Personal life ==
Müffelmann was married to Augusta Tutein on 30 July 1806. She was the daughter of Peter Tutein and Pauline Lucia Tutein Tutein.

He owned a property on Norgesgade (St. Ann's East Quarter, No. 174 A, now Bredgade 38). In 1809, he also bought a country house at Prinsessestien in Kongens Lyngby. From May 1825 to 1830, Christian Winther served as tutor for some of their eix children. Winther fell in love with Müffelmann's daughter Alvvilde but she did not share his feelings, although they remained friends for the rest of their lives.

Müffelmann's wife died on 22 February 1844. Müffelmann died on 27 May 1848. He was survived by six of their children.Their daughter Thora (1808–1889) was married to Professor of Medicine Christian Ludvig Voss.
