= 1848 Danish Constituent Assembly election =

Elections for the Constituent Assembly were held in Denmark on 5 October 1848. Of the 158 seats in the Assembly, 114 were elected and 44 appointed by the King (of which 38 were from Denmark proper, five from Iceland and one from the Faroe Islands). An additional 31 candidates were to come from the Duchy of Schleswig but were not elected due to the First Schleswig War.

== Background ==
1848 had seen a series of revolutions across Europe. An insurrection in Holstein together with the political mobilisation of the National Liberal Party in Copenhagen led to the new king Frederick VII installing a new cabinet including National Liberal members. It was hoped that a cabinet with popular support would allow it to fight the insurrection and draw up a "free constitution" which would change the system of government from an absolute monarchy to a constitutional monarchy. Following discussions, it was decided to hold elections for a Constituent Assembly.

== Results ==
Map of the election, showing the elected members in each constituency and the appointed members.

There were only elections in 85 constituencies, as candidates were returned unopposed in the remainder. Together with the royal appointees, right-wing candidates emerged as the largest group with 52–54 seats. Left-wing candidates (congregating around the Society of the Friends of Peasants) won 45–47 seats, centrists 42–44 and others 13–19. A total of 51,775 votes were cast in the constituencies where elections were held, giving a turnout of 79.7%.

== Aftermath ==
The Assembly convened between October 1848 and May 1849. A new constitution was passed in May and signed by the King on 5 June. The new constitution created a bicameral parliament with a directly elected lower house and an indirectly elected upper house. Elections for the two houses were held in December.
