= Moses DelBanco =

Jewish-Danish lawyer

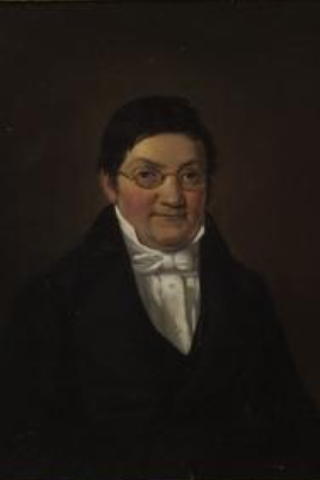
Moses Delbanco.

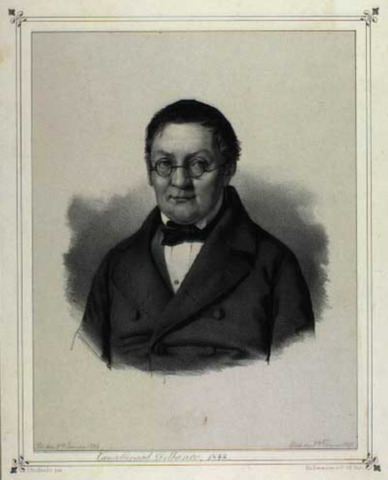
Moses Delbanco.

Moses Delbanco (17 January 1784 – 8 February 1848) was a Jewish Danish lawyer. He instigated the foundation of the Society of Layers in Copenhagen (Prokurator-Foreningen i København) and served as its first president from 1832 to 1847. He was the father of bookdealer and publisher Otto Herman Delbanco.

== Early life ==
Delbanco was born on 17 January 1784 in Copenhagen to Elias Delbanco and Penina DelBanco. His paternal grandparents were Moses (Frankfurter) Warburg and Jettchen Warburg and Salomon Moses Warburg was his paternal uncle. His maternal grandparents were Bendix Moses Henriques and Rebekka Henriques. He had four sisters: Rebekka, Bella, Rachel and Henriette. The family lived at No. 34 in Købmager Quarter at the 1801 census.

== Career ==
Delbanco earned a law degree from the University of Copenhagen in 1804. He subsequently established his own legal practice. He served as lawyer and legal consultant for the city's Jewish congregation. In 1834, he was awarded the title of kancelliråd.

Delbanco instigated the foundation of Prokurator-Foreningen i København, founded on 13 January 1932. He served as the first president of the society from 1832 to 1947.

== Personal life ==
In 1812, Delbanco was married to Beate Kalkar. The couple had five children. In 1822, in response to the 1819–20 anti-Jewish riots in Copenhagen (Jødefejden 1819-1820), they chose to have their children baptized in the Garrison Church. Neither of the parents were themselves baptized.

Delbanco owned the property Kronprinsessegade 18. The family resided in the first-floor apartment at the 1840 and 1845 censuses. His sister Rebekka and her husband Abraham Magnis resided in the ground-floor apartment.

Moses Delbanco died on 8 February 1848. He and his wife are both buried at the Jewish Cemetery in Nørrebro (graves No. G-15-1 and G-15-2).

His son Simon Wilhelm Delbanco (1815-1880) was a lawyer. His other son Otto Herman Delbanco was a bookdealer and publisher. The Delbanco Prize is named after him.
