= Svejstrup =

Coordinates: 56°04′09″N 9°50′15″E

Svejstrup is a hamlet in Skanderborg Municipality, Central Denmark Region, Denmark. It is between the towns of Skanderborg and Ry. It is one of the highest villages in Denmark, with an elevation of 80–100 meters.

Historical population
| Year | Pop. | ±% |
|---|---|---|
| 1975 | 177 | — |
| 1990 | 114 | −35.6% |
| 2000 | 91 | −20.2% |
| 2015 | 72 | −20.9% |
