= Admiralgade 19 =

Building in Copenhagen, Denmark

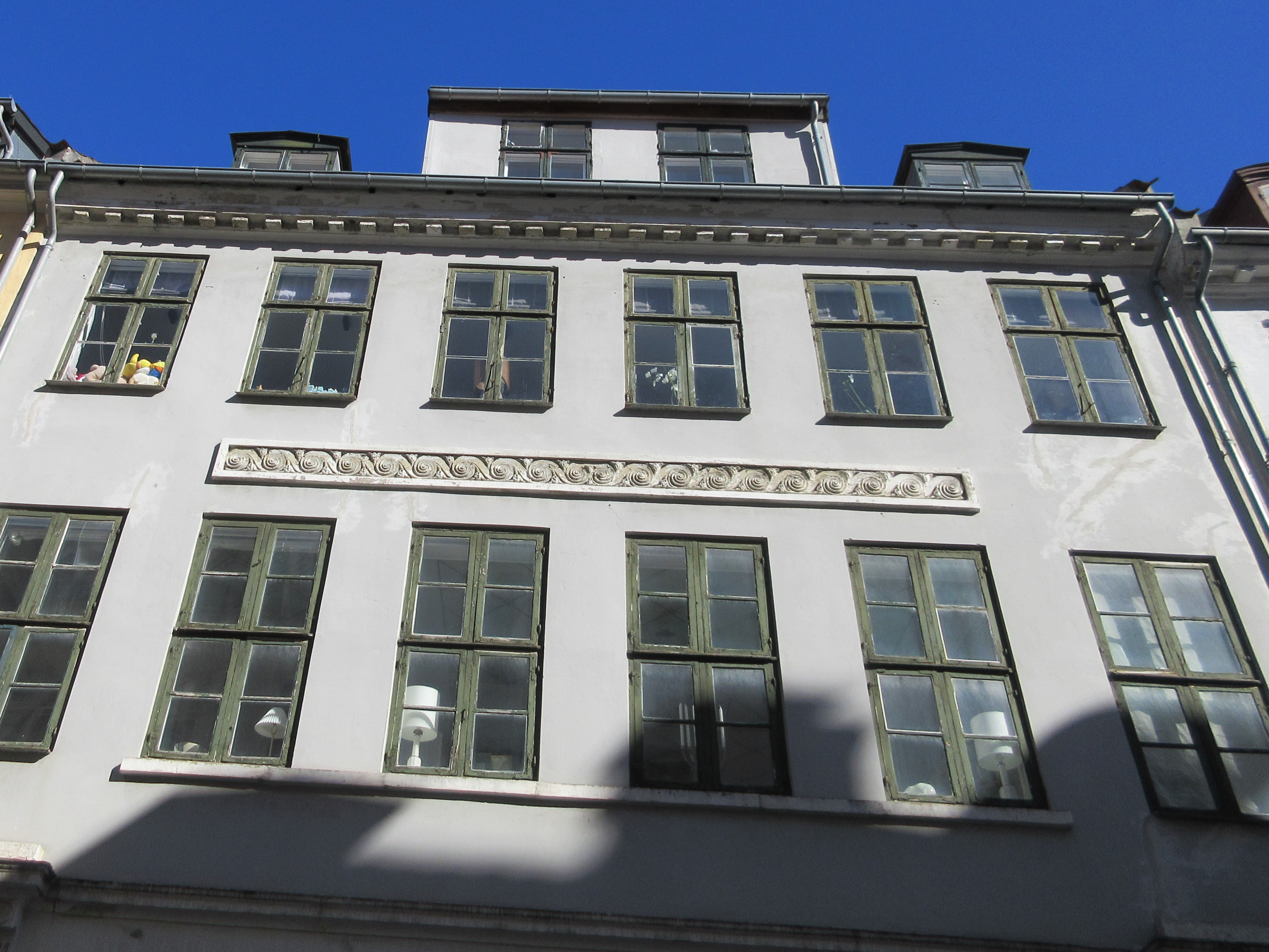
- Interactive map of the Admiralgade 19 area

General information
- Architectural style: Neoclassical
- Location: Copenhagen, Denmark
- Coordinates: 55°40′40.66″N 12°34′55.13″E
- Completed: 1797

Admiralgade 19 is a Neoclassical property situated off Nikolaj Plads in central Copenhagen, Denmark. The building was like most of the other buildings in the neighborhood constructed as part of the rebuilding of the city after the Copenhagen Fire of 1795. It was listed in the Danish registry of protected buildings and places in 1945.

== History ==
=== 17th century ===
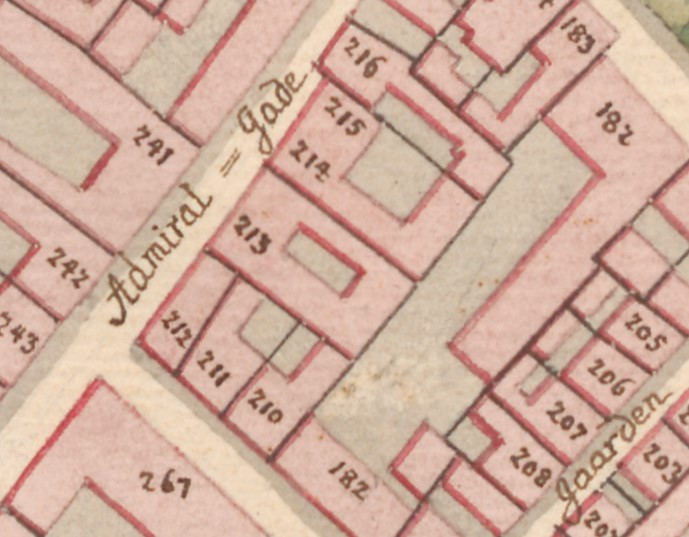
No. 213 seen in a detail from Christian Gedde's map of the East Quarter, 1757

The property was listed in Copenhagen's first cadastre of 1689 as No. No. 181 in the city's East Quarter. It was owned by sugar-baker Thomas Schrøder at that time. The property was listed in the new cadastre of 1756 as No. as No. 213 and belonged to Ferdinand Copie at that time.

=== Almind and the new building ===
The property was later acquired by candlemaker Jens Almind. His property was home to 17 residents in three households at the 1787 census. Almind resided in the building with his wife Anna Maria, their three children (aged three to 12), his sister-in-law Elisabeth Høst, lodger Berthe Jørgens Datter, one husjomfru and two maids. Niels Nielsen Olager, a cellarman, resided in the building with his wife Margrethe Elisabeth and one maid. Johan Nicolai Scheer, an organ builder, resided in the building with his wife Benedicht Christina Scheer, their two-year-old daughter Christian Abraham and one maid.Niels Nielsen Olager, a cellarman, resided in the building with his wife Margrethe Elisabeth and one maid.

Almind's building was destroyed in the Copenhagen Fire of 1795. The current building on the site was constructed for him in 1796–97. The larger property around the corner at Dybensgade 22 was also constructed for Almind in 1797. The property in Admiralgade was in the new cadastre of 1806 again listed as No. 163. It was by then still owned by Almind.

Almind's property in Admiralgade was home to 22 residents in three households at the 1801 census. Almind and his wife resided in one of the apartments with four of their children (aged eight to 25), three lodgers, a caretaker and two maids. Peter Aagaard, a pensioner, resided in the building with his wife Birgitte Sørensen and two maids. Jacob Dreier, a school teacher, resided in the building with his wife Friderike Ebsen, their daughter Margrete Dreier, two lodgers and one maid.

Almind's property was listed in the new cadastre of 1806 as No. 163 in the East Quarter.

=== 1840 census ===
The property was home to 18 33 residents in seven households at the 1840 census. The property was home to four households at the 1840 census. Christine Marie Böscher and Elisabeth Johanne Böschen, two stocking weavers, resided on the ground floor with the lodger Carl Christian Wilhelm Platon (1816-1810, law student, later herredsfoged) and a maid. Susanne Margrete Steglich, an inspector at the Music Academy, resided on the first floor with the widow Anna Margrete Nøregaard. Niels Johannes Bertelsen, a civil servant at Copenhagen County (Københavns Amtsstue), resided on the second floor with his wife Ane Cathrine Stendrup, their two children (aged 17 and 18) and one maid. Helene Jensen, a pensioner, resided on the third floor with two unmarried children (aged 21 and 27) and the lodgers Johannes Mathias Dahl (1718-1861, theology student) and Severin Broberg (1822-1890, theology student and later writer). Cherstine Marie Hansen, a candler and bread retailer, resided in the basement with four of her children (aged 17 to 25), a nine-year-old foster daughter and three lodgers. Peter Wilhelm Petersen, a master joiner, resided in the rear wing with his sister Ane Sofie Petersen. Andreas Christian Petersen, a master joiner, resided on the ground floor of the rear wing with his wife Christine Jensen, their six-year-old son Charl August Petersen and one maid.

=== 1850 census ===
The property was home to 30 residents in six households at the 1850 census. Christine Marie Børcher and Hanne Elisabeth Børcher, two manufacturers of stockings, resided on the ground floor with one maid and the lodger Lars Christian Nyholm (law student). Moses Levin, a restaurateur, resided on the first floor with his wife Hanne Amuel, two unmarried daughters (aged 31 and 33), one maid and three lodgers. Niels Johannes Bertelsen, a retired clerk, resided on the second floor with his wife Nielsine Marie Sophie Bertelsen, their unmarried daughter Ane Catharine Bertelsen and one maid. Jacob Frederich Hüttenrauch, a military musician at the 2nd Brigade, resided on the third floor with his wife Dorthea Marie Holm, their two children (aged 13 and 17) and the lodger Christian Heiberg Frimann (retired medical doctor). Christen Jensen, a barkeeper, resided in the basement with his wife Christine Lorenze Bakke, their 14-year-old son Peter Frederik Jensen and two lodgers. Andreas Christian Petersen, a master joiner, resided on the second floor of the rear wing with his wife Kirstine Jensen, their son Carl August Petersen and the lodger Amalie Gregerine Lund.

=== Later history ===
The property was initially listed as Admiralgade 5 when house numbering by street was introduced in 1759 as a supplement to the old cadastral numbers by quarter. In 1784, it was changed to Admiralgade 19.

The building was adapted in the 1840s. It was listed in the Danish registry of protected buildings and places in 1945.

== Architecture ==
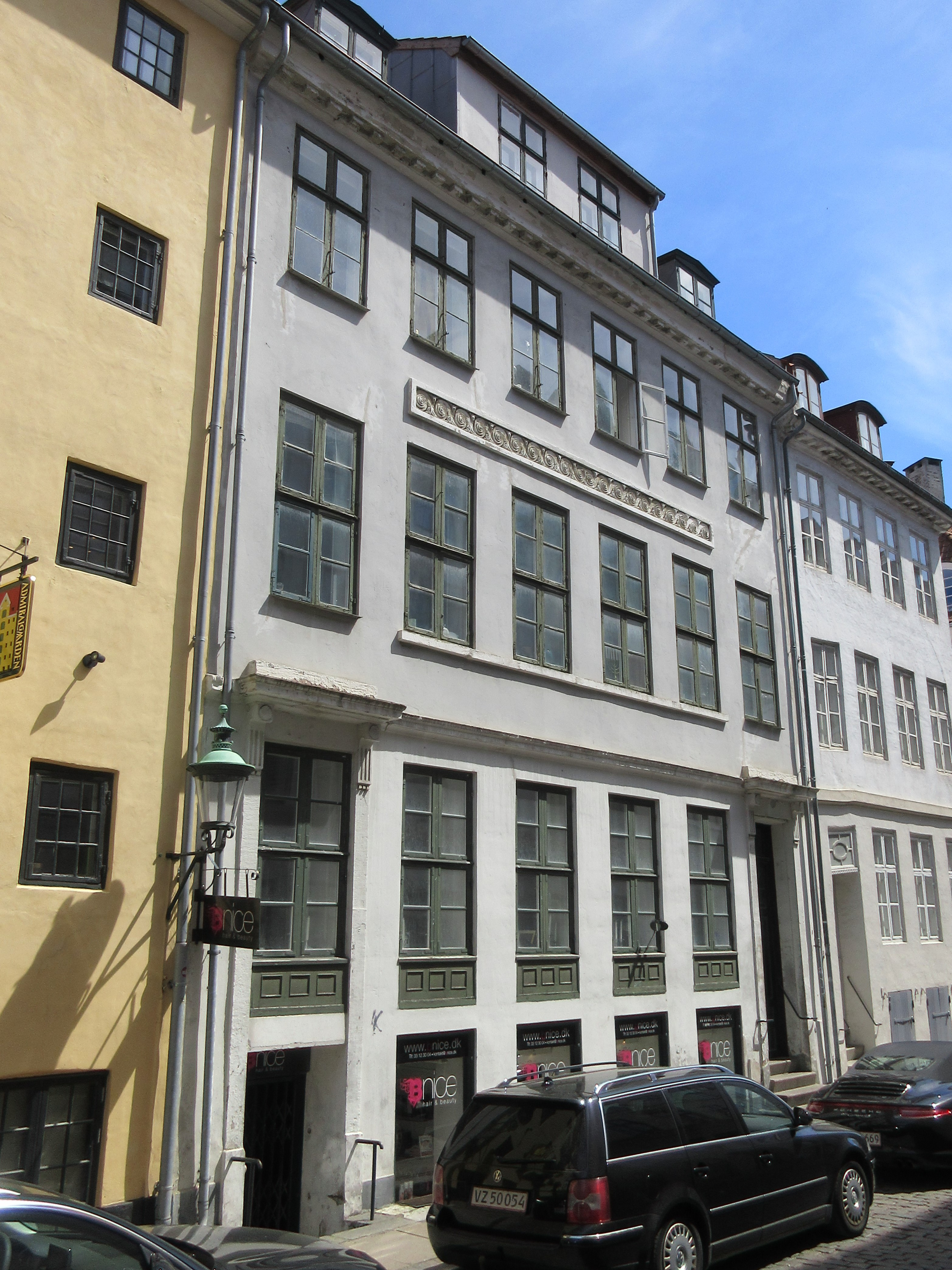
Admiralgade 19

Amaliegade 19 is constructed in brick with three storeys over a walk-out basement. It consists of a six-bay front wing towards the street, a perpendicular side wing and a rear wing. The front side on the building is plastered and white-painted with a cornice band above the ground floor and a modillioned cornice under the roof. The four central bays are visually brought together by a through-going sill under the windows on the first floor and a Vitruvian scroll frieze between the windows of the first and second floor. The main entrance in the bay furthest to the right is topped by a hood mould supported by corbels. A similar hood mould is placed above the ground floor window furthest to the left to create an impression of symmetry. The pitched tile roof features a two-bay dormer from 1840 flanked by two traditional dormer windows. The yard side of the building is finished with iron vitriol yellow lime mortar. The side wing and rear wing have monopitched tile roofs.

== Today ==
The building is owned by E/F Admiralgade 19 - 19 A. The building contains two condominiums—one large one in the front wing and the somewhat smaller one in the rear wing—on each floor.
