= Hans Sveistrup =

Danish priest

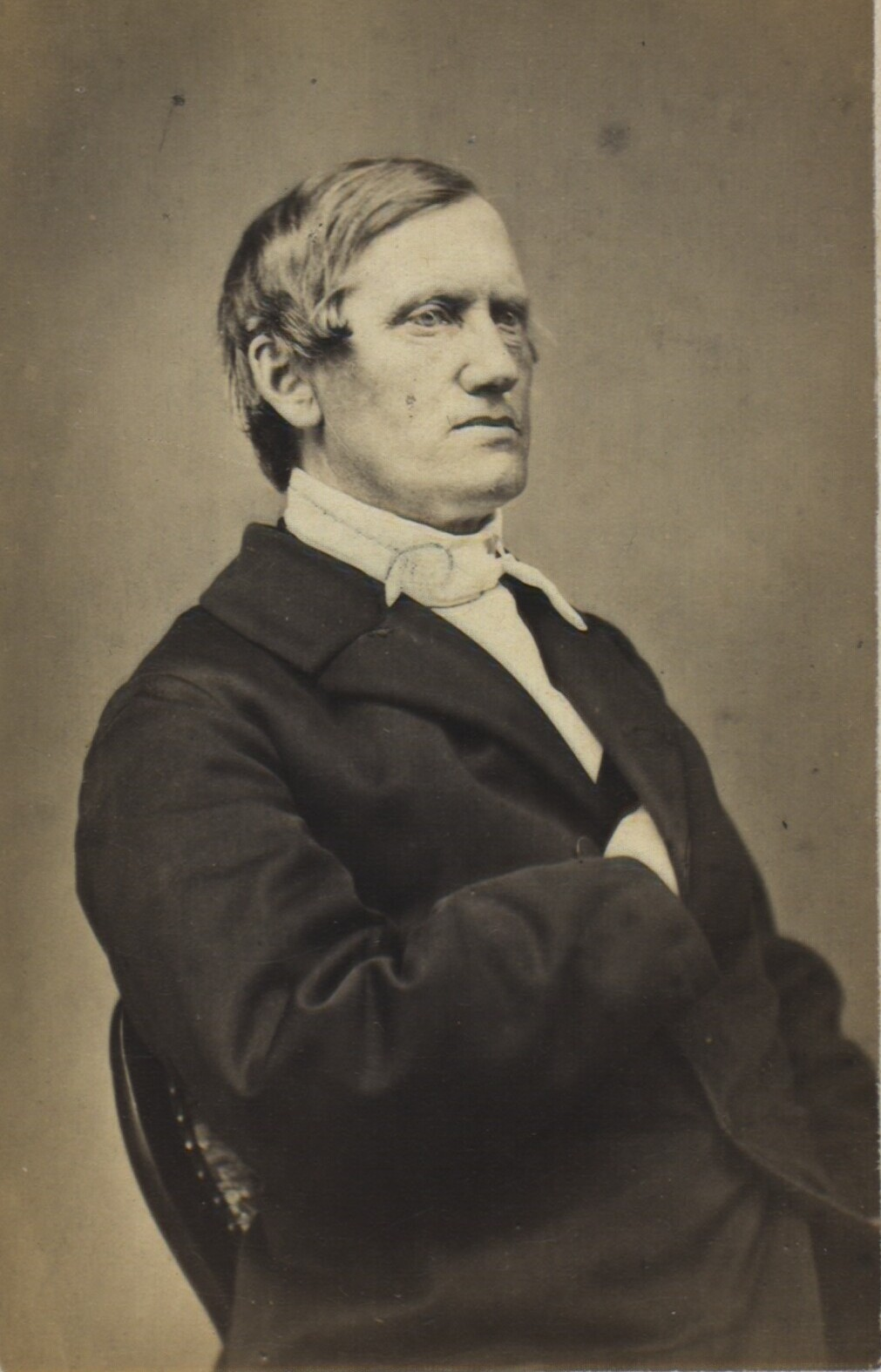

Hans Kristian Janus Nikolaj Balthasar Krarup Sveistrup (born 20 January 1815 in Maltbæk, died 31 July 1893 in Vejen) was a Danish priest. He was the uncle of Poul Sveistrup.

He was briefly elected Member of Parliament for Bække in 1853, but did not stand at the next election three months later.
