= Poul Sveistrup =

Poul Sveistrup (2 June 1848–18 April 1911) was a Danish politician and social statistician. From 1903 to 1909 he was Member of Parliament for Viborg, representing the Left Reform Party. He published detailed investigations into the economic and social conditions of Copenhagen seamstresses, partly in the "National Economic Journal".

He was the nephew of Hans Sveistrup.
