= Christiansborg Palace (2nd) =

Residence of the Danish monarch

Second Christiansborg Palace
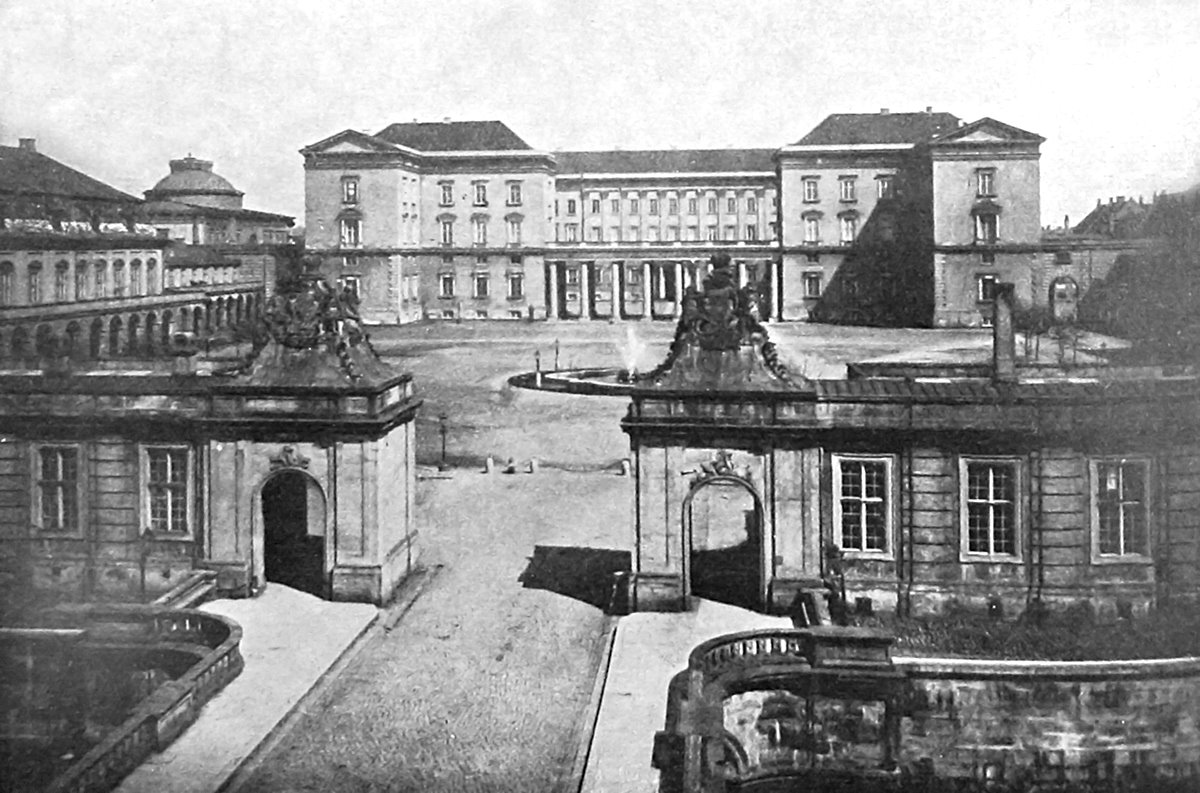
- The second Christiansborg Palace, view across the show grounds
- Interactive map of the Second Christiansborg Palace area

General information
- Architectural style: Neoclassical
- Location: Copenhagen, Denmark
- Coordinates: 55.6763°N 12.5806°E
- Construction started: 1803
- Completed: 1828
- Demolished: 1884
- Cost: 1,000,000 Rigsdaler
- Client: Christian VII

Design and construction
- Architect: Christian Frederik Hansen

The second Christiansborg Palace was a new main residence for the Danish Monarch built from 1803 to 1828 in Copenhagen as a replacement for the first Christiansborg Palace which had been destroyed by fire in 1794. The new palace was constructed on Slotsholmen, on the ruins of its predecessor, and designed by royal master builder Christian Frederik Hansen. By the time the palace was completed, King Frederick VI had found himself comfortable at his temporary residence at Amalienborg Palace and decided he did not want to live in the new palace after all. He only used the royal premises for entertainment. The palace also housed the Parliament and administrative services. Frederik VII was the only monarch to live in the palace. This was between 1852 and 1863.

== History ==
=== Construction of the new Christiansborg ===
After the fire in 1794, the royal family initially took up temporary residency at Rosenborg Castle and later moved to Amalienborg Palace. Christian Frederik Hansen, until then master builder in Altona, was called upon to resurrect the palace. Construction started in 1803 but was slow as a result of the difficult times compounded by the Napoleonic Wars and the national bankruptcy in 1813.

=== Second Christiansborg's short life, 1828–1884 ===
By the time the palace was completed, King Frederick VI was happy with his temporary residence at Amalienborg and decided he did not want to live in the new palace after all, using it only for entertainment. Frederik VII was the only monarch to live in the palace.

Christiansborg became a focal point for many of the events which led up to the transition from absolute monarchy to democracy in 1849. After large crowds had gathered in front of the palace in March 1848, the Constitution of Denmark was adopted on 5 June 1849. The king ceded some of his chambers to the new Parliament, Rigsdagen, which from January 1850 had sessions in the wing where Folketinget meets today.

Other parts of the palace continued to be used by the royal family. Frederick VII was the only monarch to live in the palace, between 1852 and 1863.

=== Fire of 1884 ===
The second Christiansborg burned down in October 1884. Hansen's chapel and the building linking the palace to the chapel were left undamaged as were the showgrounds, court theatre and pavilions. These had also survived the fire of 1794.

The third and current Christiansborg was built between 1907 and 1928 by Thorvald Jørgensen in a neo-baroque style that pays lip service to the first Christiansborg. The building is used by the Danish parliament.

== Architecture ==
The second Christiansborg was designed in a French Empire style. It was built on the foundations and remaining walls of its predecessor but the wing with the tower and Grand Hall was not rebuilt but replaced by a colonnade.

== See also ==
- Architecture of Denmark
- Architect Christian Frederik Hansen
