= Ny Kongensgade =

Street in Copenhagen, Denmark

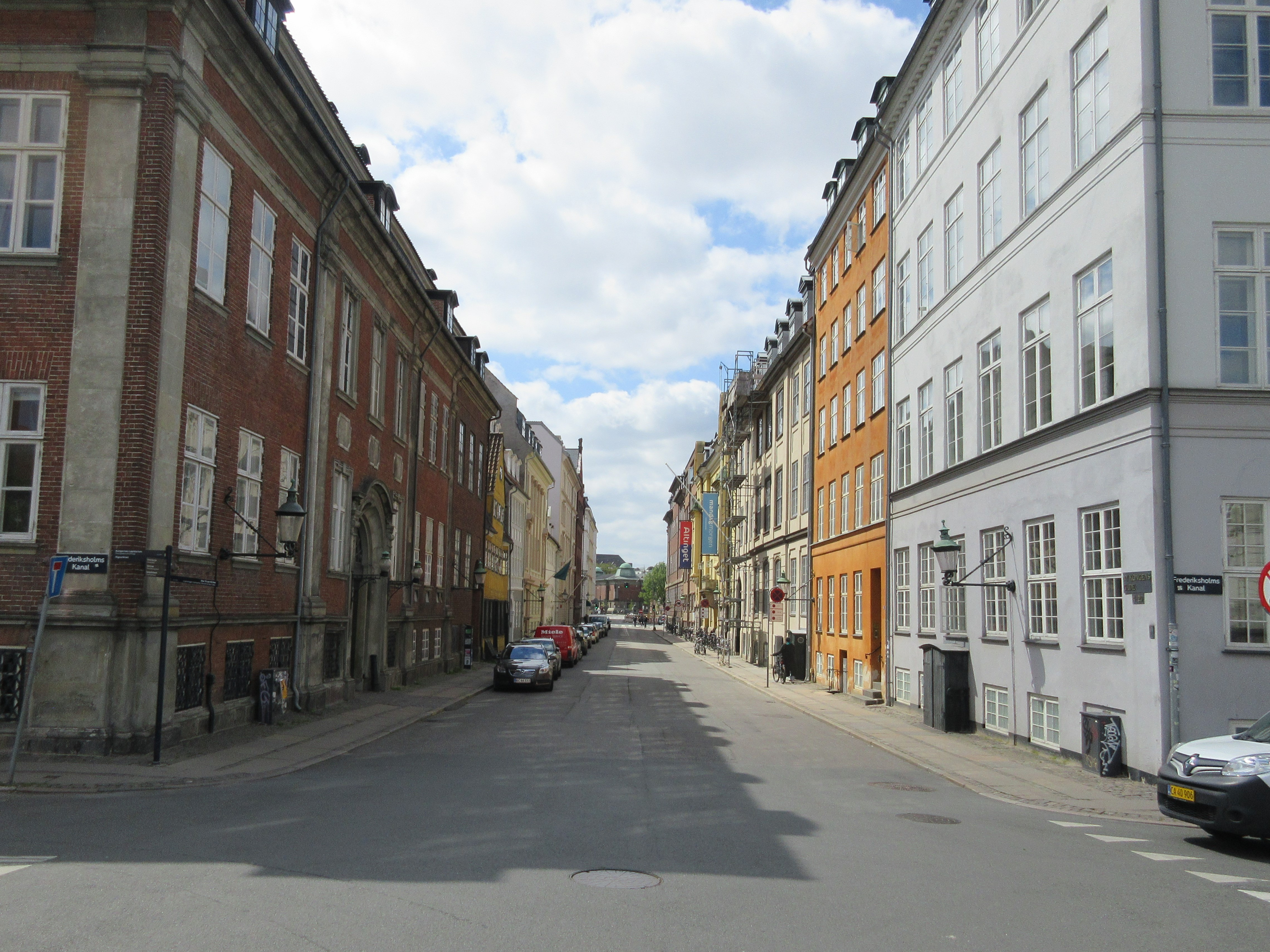
- Ny Kongensgade seen from Frederiksholms Kanal
- Interactive map of Ny Kongensgade
- Length: 158 m (518 ft)
- Location: Copenhagen, Denmark
- Quarter: Frederiksholm Quarter
- Postal code: 1552
- Nearest metro station: Gammel Strand
- Coordinates: 55°40′23.88″N 12°34′31.08″E
- West end: Frederiksholms Kanal
- Wast end: Vester Voldgade

Ny Kongensgade (literally "New King's Street) is a street in central Copenhagen, Denmark, connecting Frederiksholm Canal to H. C. Andersens Boulevard. In the opposite direction, The Prince's Bridge connects the street to Tøjhusgade on Slotsholmen.

== History ==
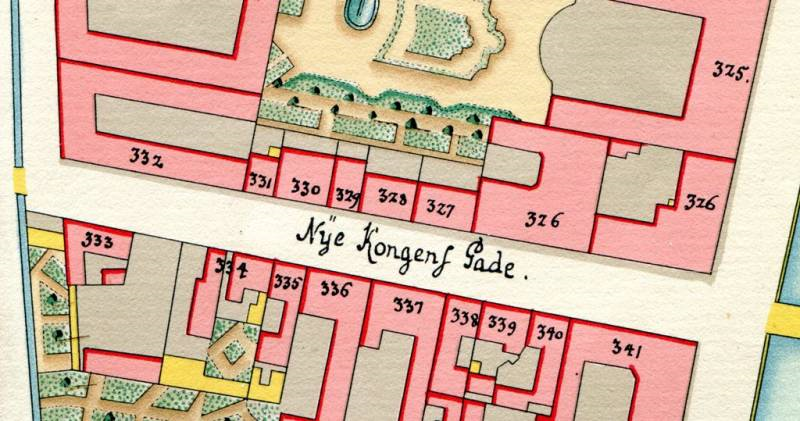
My Kongensgade seen on Gedde's District Map from 1757

The first houses along the street were built in about 1670 when it was known as Prindsensgade. It is unknown when the name was changed but it is referred to as Nye Kongensgade on Gedde's Map of Copenhagen from 1757.

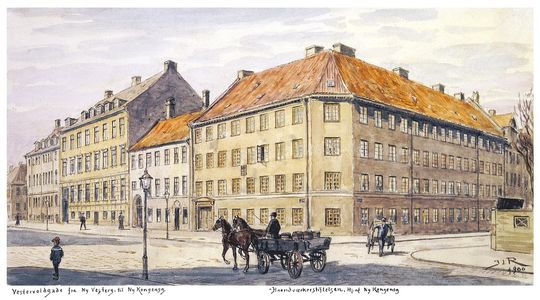
Håndværkerstiftelsen's building in 1900

The original street only reached as far as the Western Rampart at present day Vester Voldgade, then a narrow alley on the inside of the rampart, connecting Vartov to the coast. When that portion of the Fortification Ring was finally decommissioned in 1885, as one of the last to be so, Ny Kongensgade was extended to Vester Boulevard (now H. C. Andersens Boulevard).

Håndværkerstiftelsen opened on the corner of Ny Kongensgade and Vester Voldgade on 1 August 1887, providing affordable accommodation for elderly craftsmen and their widows. Håndværkerstiftelsen moved to new premises on Blegdamsvej in 1902, selling their old building to Dansk Arbejdsgiverforening. St. Knud's Chapel was locasted on the other side of the street. It was purchased by varon Holger Stampe and his wife Caroline Stampe-Charisius in 1898 and replaced by Mariahjemmet.

== Notable buildings and residents ==
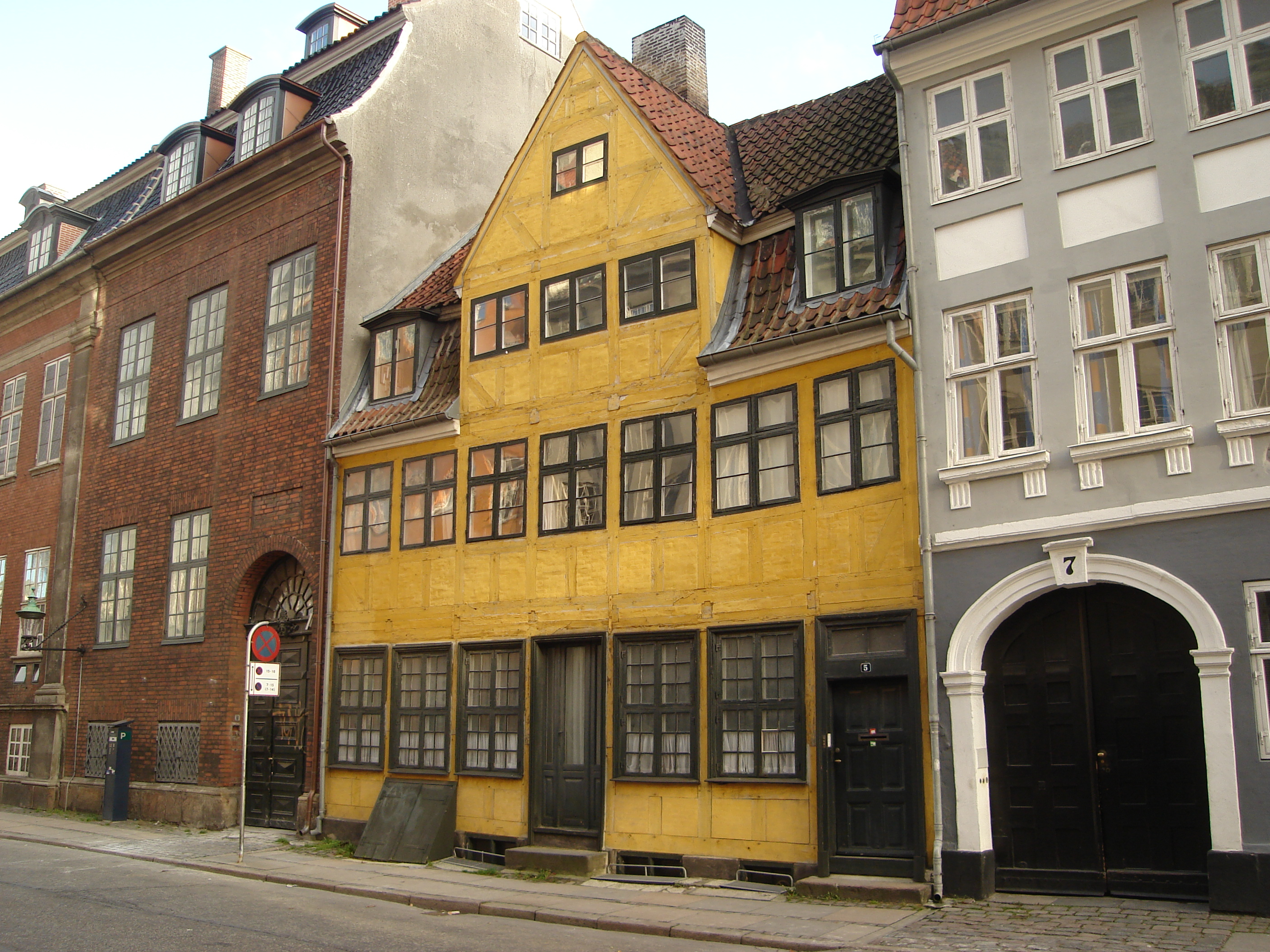
My Kongensgade 5

The most prominent building in the street is Barchmann Mansion on the corner with Frederiksholms Kanal whose principal façade, nine bays long, faces the street. It was completed in 1741 to a design by Philip de Lange. Most of the other buildings in the first part of the street also date from the 18th century and are listed. The low half-timbered building at No. 5 is a former akvavit distillery and was most likely completed between 1728 and 1732.

No. 6 is from 1754 and was for many years a Jewish community centre, sometimes referred to as the Jew's Town Hall, until a new community centre was inaugurated at the Great Synagogue in Krystalgade in 2013. The Danish Jewish Community also built Eibesschützs Stiftelse at No. 10. The building was designed by Frederik Levy and completed in 1903. The building is now home to the digital media group Altinget.

Dansk Arbejdsgiverforening's building on the corner of Vester Voldgade (No. 113) and Ny Kongensgade (No. 16a) was built 1910–1911 to a design by Axel Berg.

== See also ==
- Ny Vestergade
