= Vester Voldgade 19 =

Building in Copenhagen

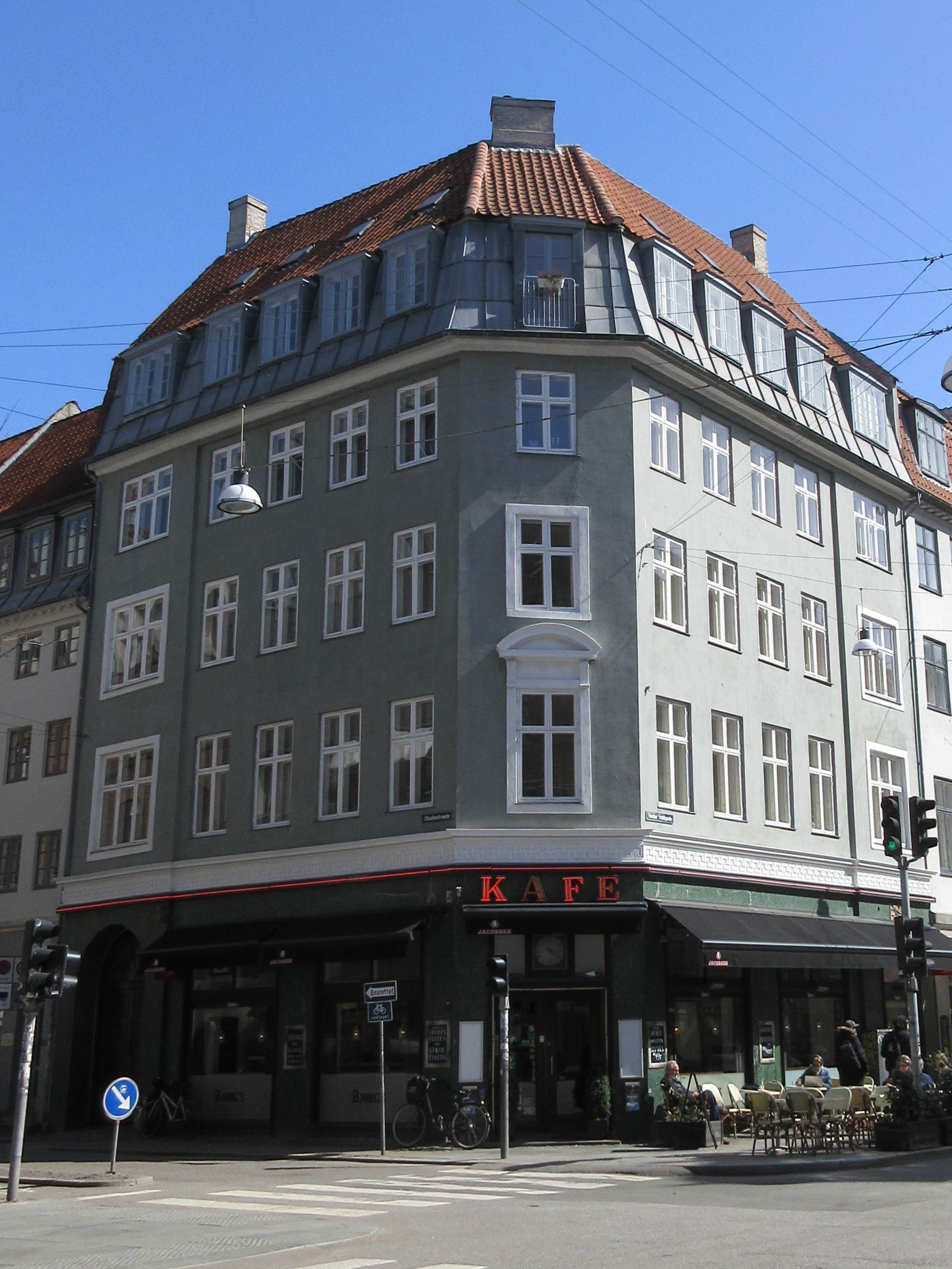

General information
- Location: Copenhagen, Denmark
- Coordinates: 55°40′39.97″N 12°34′2.57″E
- Completed: 1797
- Renovated: 1845 (heightened)
- Client: Hinrich Ladiges

Vester Voldgade 19 is a Neoclassical property located at the corner of Vester Voldgade (No. 19) and Studiestræde (No. 49) in the Latin Quarter of Copenhagen, Denmark. The building was listed on the Danish registry of protected buildings and places in 1974. It is now owned by Esbjerg Municipality. The building was constructed in 1796–97 and heightened in 1845.

== History ==
=== 19th century ===
Three small houses at the site were destroyed in the Copenhagen Fire of 1795. A new building was constructed in 1796-97 for barber Lars Hansen Tøyring. It was heightened by his heirs in 1845.

The composer Hans Christian Lumbye was a resident in the building in 1848. The politician Hans Egede Schack was among the residents ten years later.

Ph. L. Nathan opened Kjøbenhavns Manufaktur- og Klædeoplag in the late 1890s and lived in one of the apartments on the second floor. The Danish Women's Society and Danish Women's Council were later among the tenants.

=== 2+th century ===
The building was in 1924 acquired by the coffee wholesaler Anton Linnet. He converted the ground floor into a coffee outlet the following year. He purchased the adjacent building at Studiestræde 47 in 1935 two years later also the one at Vester Voldgade 21. The coffee company and associated buildings were later handed down to his son Palle Linnet.

Linnet's coffee shop closed in 1976. The building was sold to aktieselskabet Rafiki, in 1979. The new owner converted it into nine condominiums. All nine apartments were in 1997 sold to Esbjerg Municipality.

== Architecture ==
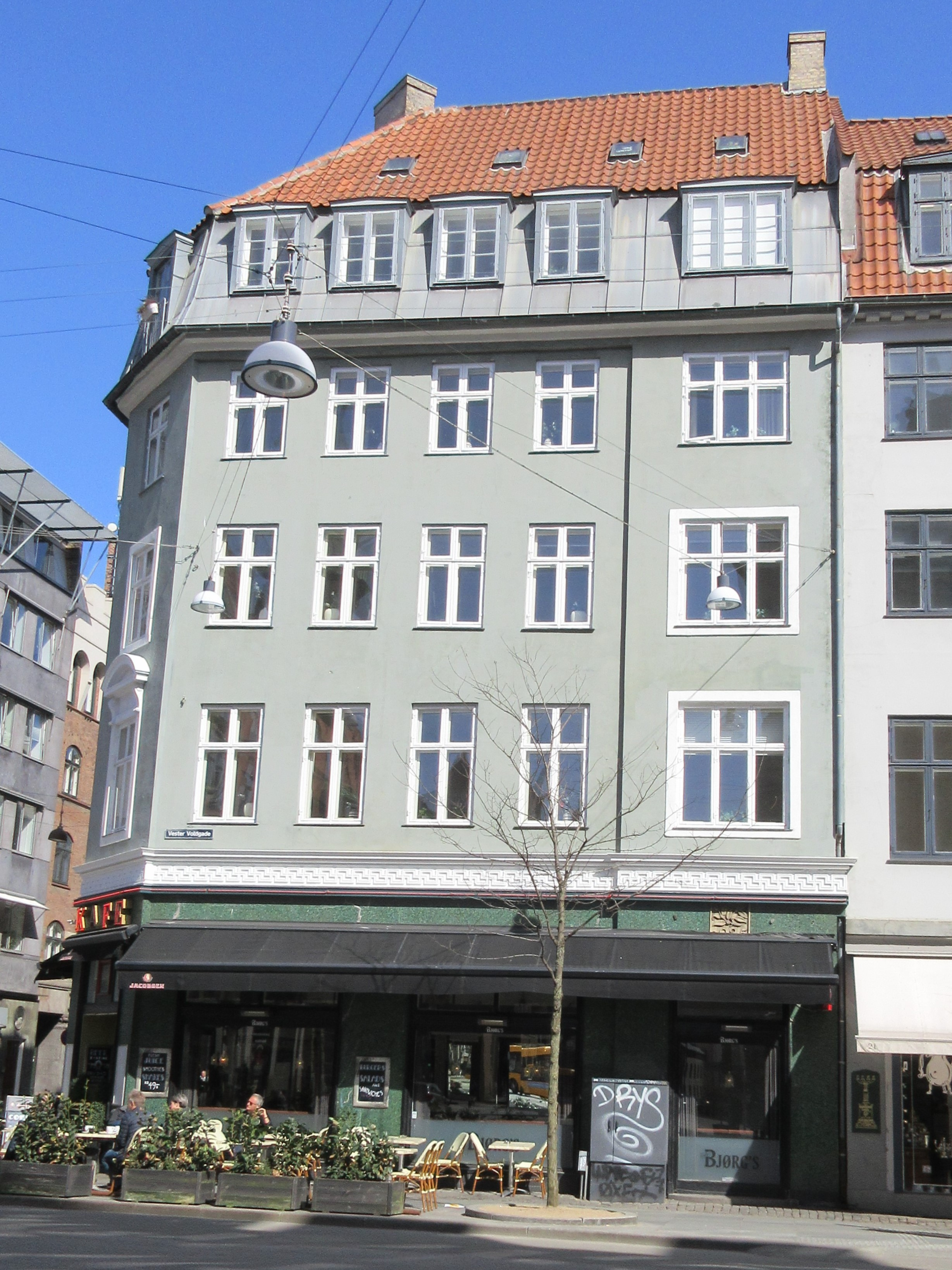
The building seen from Vester Voldgade

The building consists of four floors and a Mansard roof over a cellar. The Mansard roof is clad with zinc on the lower part and red tiles on the upper part. The facades towards both Vester Voldgade and Studiestræde are five bays wide and meet in a chamfered corner bay. The wider, outer bay on each side of the building is placed in a corner risalit. The corner window on the first floor is topped by a rounded pediment. Between the ground floor and the first floor runs a frieze featuring a Greek key. The former main entrance towards Vester Voldgade was converted into a display window in 1925. The year of the conversion is inscribed in sandstone relief numbers above the window. A gate topped by a fanlight is located in the corner risalit towards Studiestræde.

== Today ==
The building is still owned by Rsbjerg Municipality and the apartments are used by employees with business in Copenhagen. The ground floor houses a bar.
