= Vester Voldgade 21 =

Building in Copenhagen, Denmark

Coordinates: 55°40′40″N 12°34′03″E

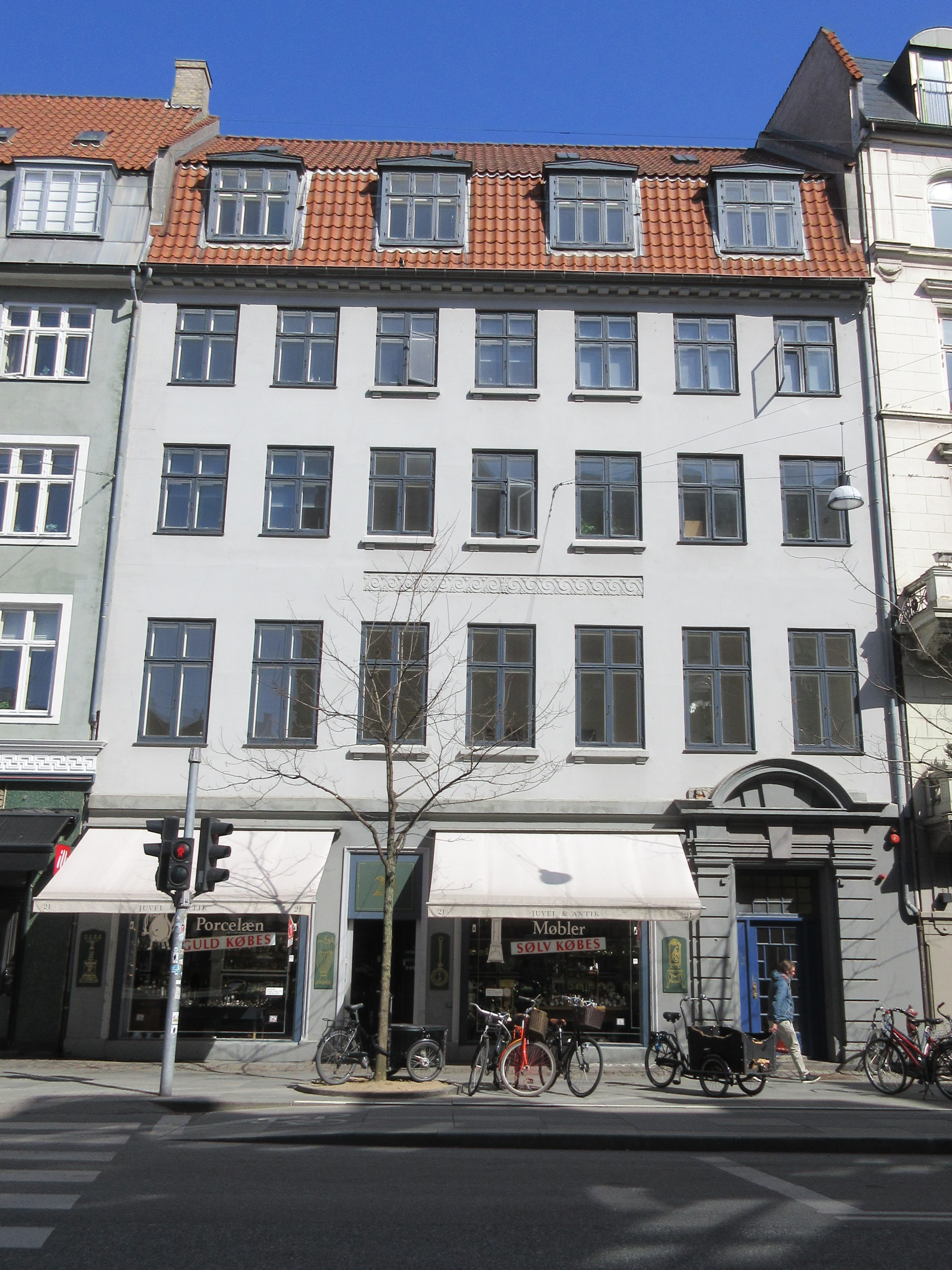
Vester Voldgade 21

Vester Voldgade 21 is a Neoclassical property in Vester Voldgade, close to City Hall Square, in Copenhagen, Denmark. The Hotel Valdemar was from 1870 to 1917 based in the building. It was listed on the Danish registry of protected buildings and places in 1974.

== History ==
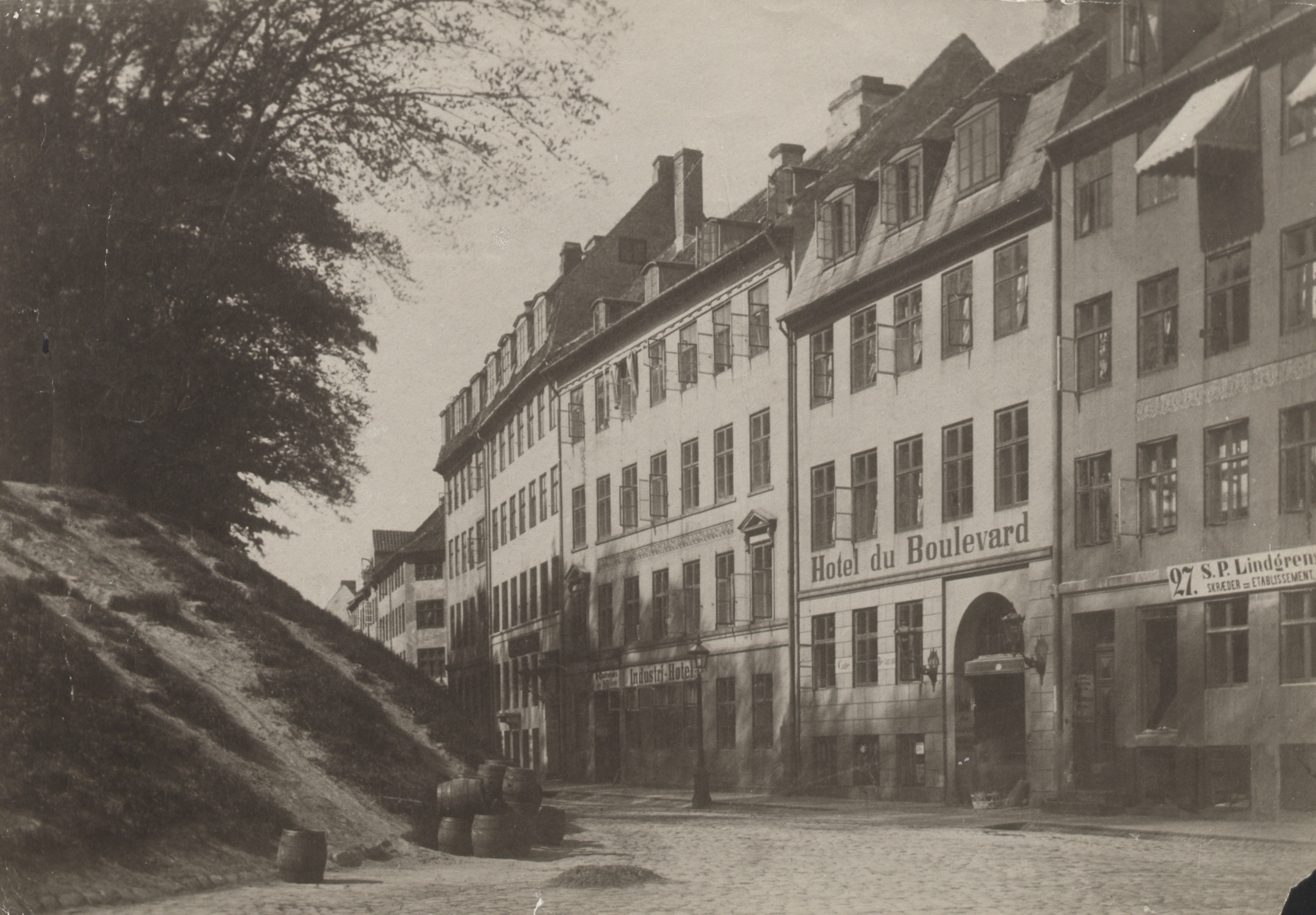
The building in 1880.

=== Early history ===
Two smaller houses at the site were destroyed in the Copenhagen Fire of 1795. The current building was constructed in 1797–98 for the innkeeper Jørgen Petersen. It was then a three-storey building with a saddle roof. The property was in 1832 heightened by his heirs with an additional storey and a Mansard roof.

=== Hotel Valdemar ===
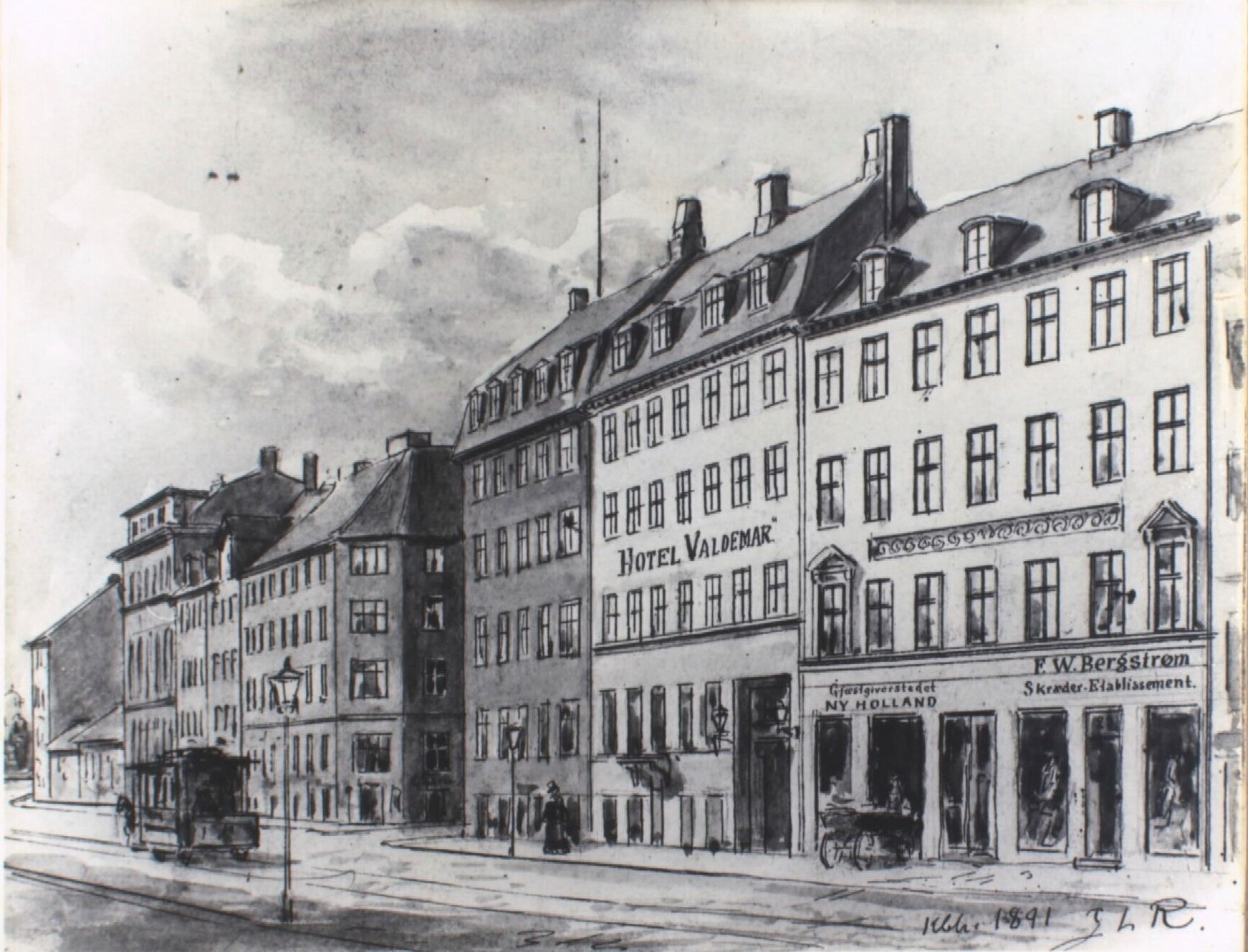
Hotel Valdemar on a drawing by Janus Laurentius Ridter, 1891

The Hotel Valdemar opened in the building in 1870. It was later followed by a number of other hotels on the short street section between Jarmers Plads and Vestergade: Møllers Hotel (later Meyers Hotel), Park Hotel (Hotel Fox and now Hotel Sp 34, No. 3), Hotel Falster (later Hotel Sønderjylland and Ny Boulevard, No. 15), Gjæstgiveriet Harreschous Enke (later Hotel du Boulevard and then Hotel Hafnia, No. 23), Hotel Kong Frederik (previously Den Hvide Hanes, No. 25), Industrihotellet (No 29), Hotel Prinsen (previously Jacobsens Gjæstgiveri, No. 31), and Hotel Bellevue (No. 39). The Hotel Valdemar was more humble than the others. N. Yde purchased the hotel in the 1890s. He had an apartment on the ground floor before moving to Frederiksberg and leaving the management of the hotel in the hands of K. L. Bendtsen and later Lars Hansen. The hotel closed c. 1917.

=== Later history ===
Vester Voldgade 21 was after the closure of the hotel owned first by Emissions-Anstalten and then by Forsikringsselskabet No Sve Dan. The businessman A. P. Nissen was among the residents in 1919.

In around 1930, it was purchased by a private individual, Ellen Lind, who lived elsewhere. Københavns Huslejerforening and Frederiksberg Huslejerforening were among the tenants for the next almost 40 years. Danmarks Lejerforening was for a while also based in the building. Other tenants included a law firm, a goldsmith, a carpet company and a language institute. A commercial art gallery named Malernes Udstilling was another tenant.

Denmark's first American-style diner, with the city's first soda fountain opened in the building in 1942. It was initially called Jack's Soda Fountain, but its name was after 4–5 years changed to The International Soda Fountain or Willi's Place. Willie D. Witt served milkshakes while his mother worked in the kitchen. It was a popular hang-out for people from the media, fashion and music industries as well as young people who hoped to be "discovered". The customers included Claus Pagh and Bent Fabritius-Bjerre.

== Cultural references ==
The International Soda Fountain plays a central role in Leif Panduro's film Støvsugerbanden.

== See also ==
- Vester Voldgade 19
