= H. C. Andersens Boulevard =

Street in Copenhagen, Denmark

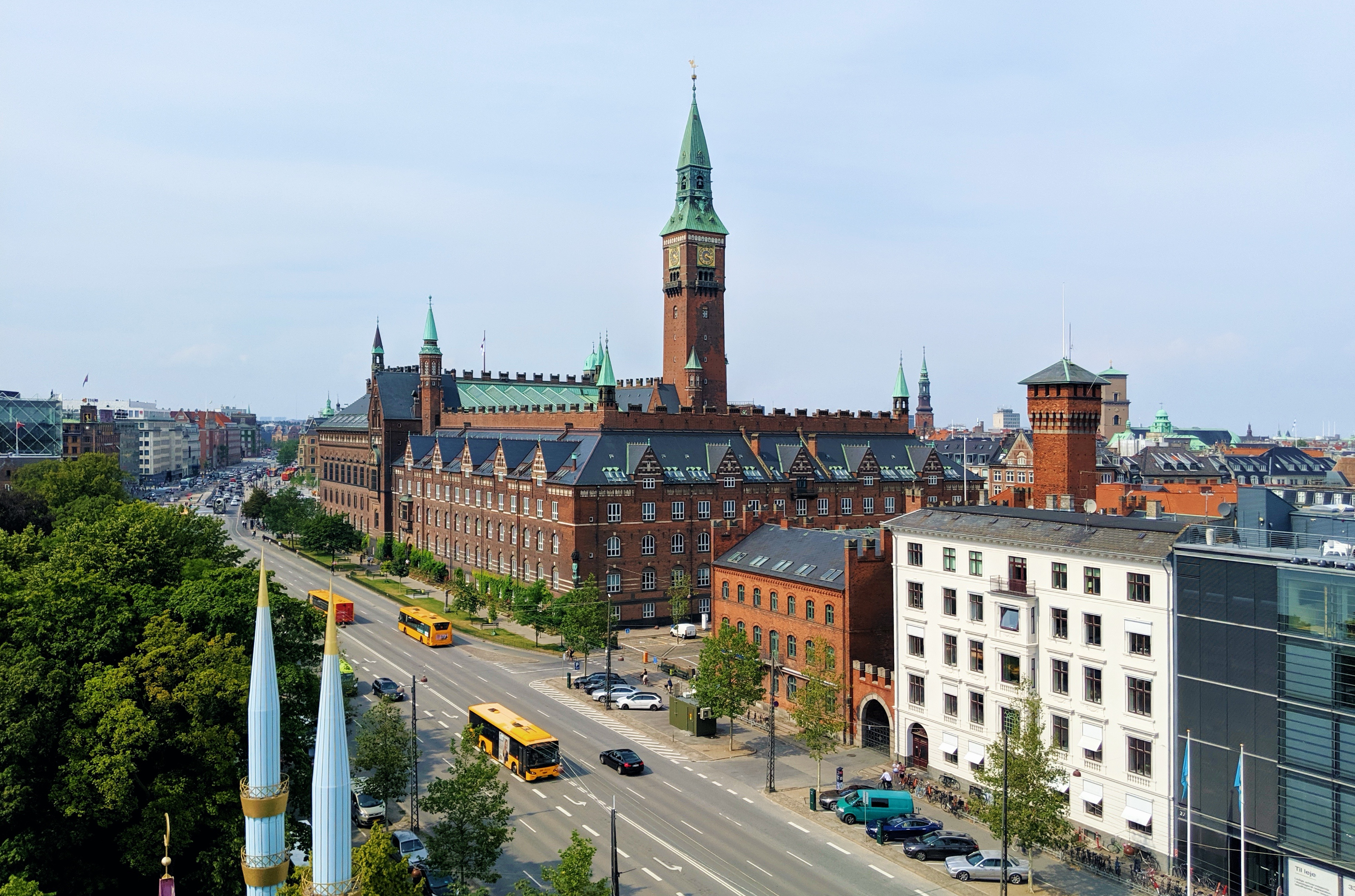
- Length: 1,300 m (4,300 ft)
- Location: Copenhagen, Denmark
- Quarter: Indre By
- Nearest metro station: Rådhuspladsen
- Coordinates: 55°40′28.67″N 12°34′12.11″E
- Northwest end: Jarmers Plads
- Major junctions: Vesterbrogade
- Southeast end: Langebro

H. C. Andersens Boulevard is the most densely trafficked artery in central Copenhagen, Denmark. The 1.3 km long six-lane street passes City Hall Square on its way from Jarmers Plads, a junction just north of Vesterport station, to Lange Bridge which connects it to Amager Boulevard on Amager. From Jarmers Plads traffic continues along Gyldenløvesgade which on the far side of The Lakes splits into Aaboulevard and Rosenørns Allé. At the City Hall Square the boulevard meets Vesterbrogade, another very busy and importaint street. Major landmarks along the street include Copenhagen City Hall, Copenhagen Central Fire Station and the Ny Carlsberg Glyptotek.

== History ==
=== Vestre Boulevard ===
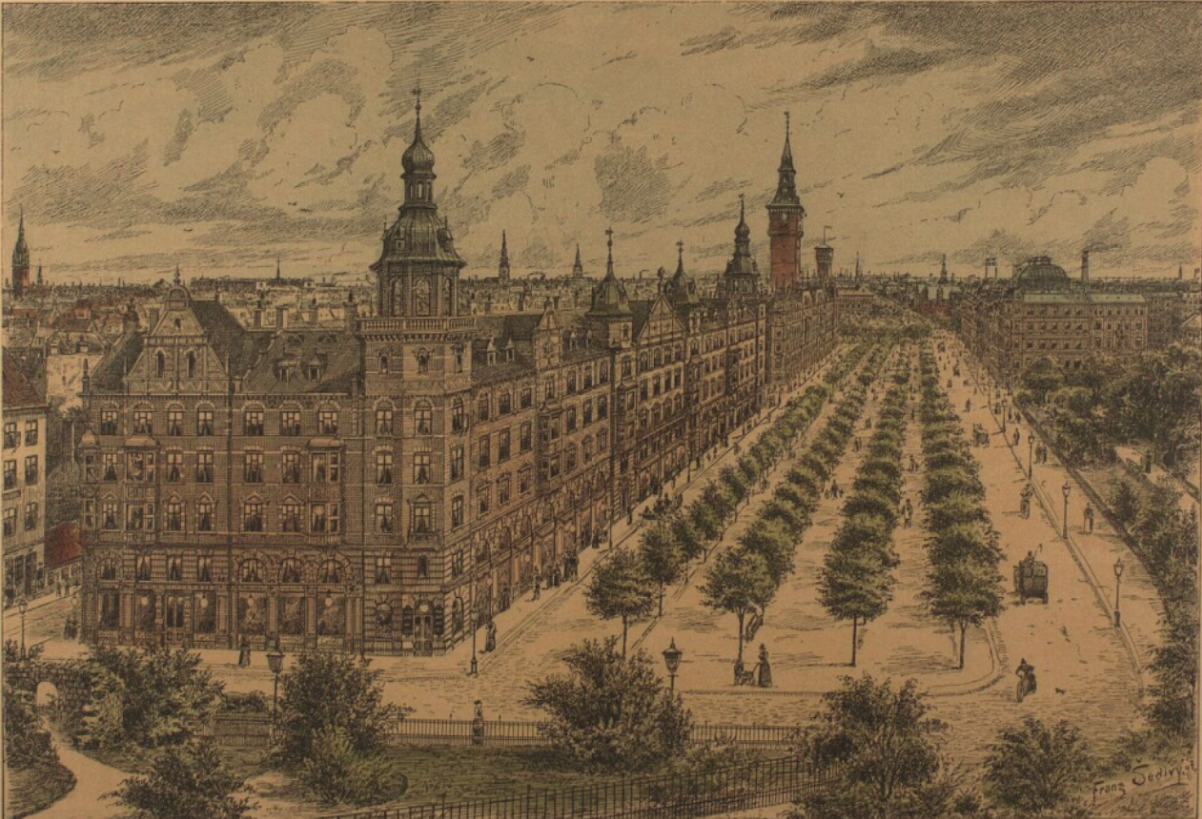
Franz Šedivý: The boulevard in 1894

H. C. Andersens Boulevard, originally known as Vestre Boulevard, was planned after Copenhagen's fortifications had been decommissioned and roughly follows the course of the moat which ran outside the West Rampart. It was inspired by Vienna's Ringstraße as well as Haussmann's wide boulevards in Paris. Its final course was determined in a plan from 1872. As it was not intended for through traffic, most traffic to and from Lange Bridge still used Vester Voldgade. In 1890, Vestre Boulevard was laid out as a green promenade with an abundance of trees and flowers where the city's bourgeoisie would stroll in peaceful surroundings.

=== First expansion ===
When Lange Bridge was replaced with a new bridge in 1903, it was built as a direct continuation of Vestre Boulevard. The Dante Column was installed in front of the Ny Carlsberg Glyptotek in 1922 and the surrounding section of the street was renamed Dantes Plads.

=== New name and expansion ===
During World War II, the broad central reservation was used for construction of bunkers. Soon after the war, the lanes were widened in response to increasing car traffic. In 1954, a new Lange Bridge opened as a direct continuation of Vestre Boulevard to release the pressure on the more narrow Vester Voldgade.

== Buildings ==
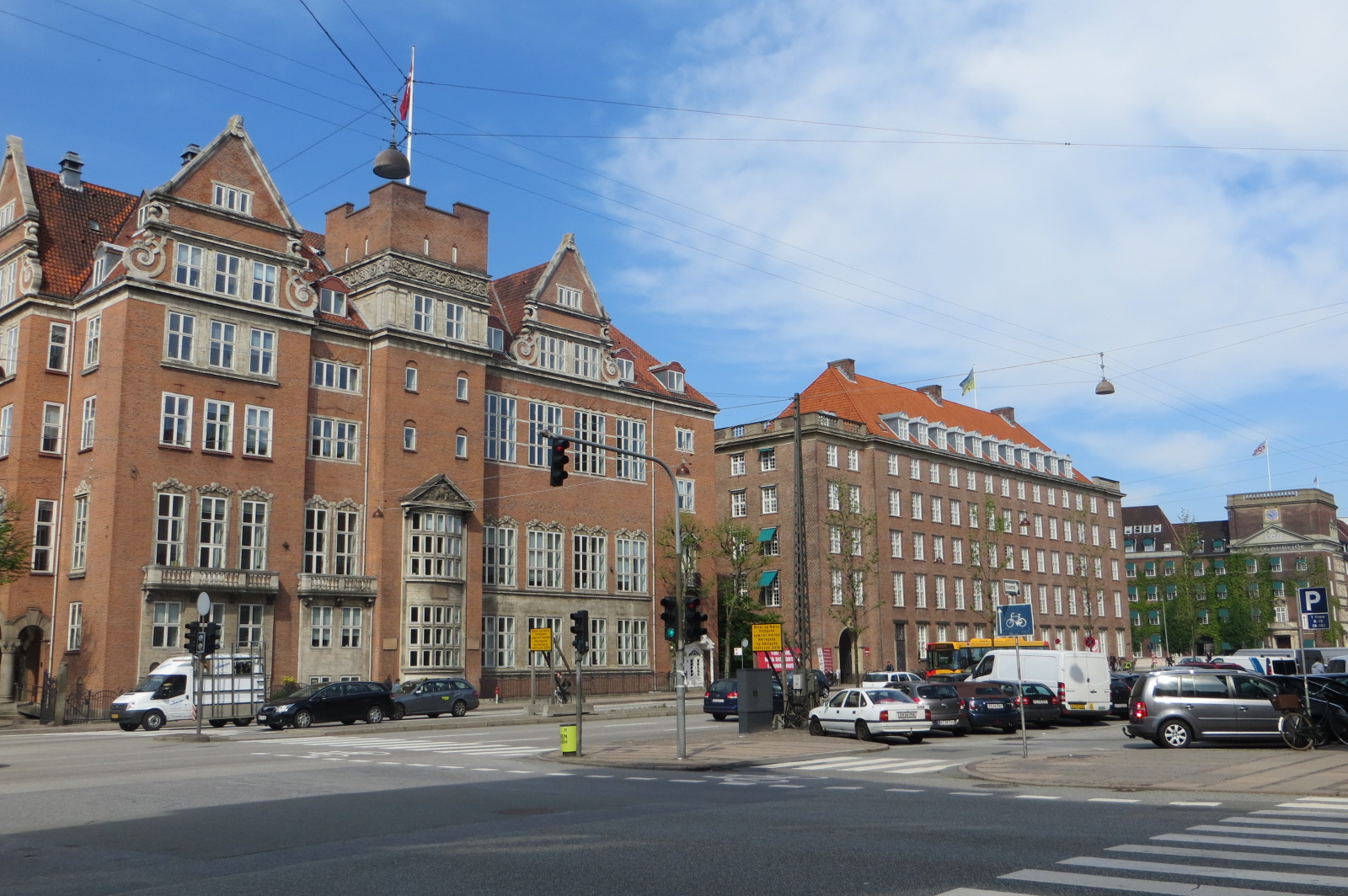
The Studenterforeningen building (left)

- No. 10 (Tegneskolen for Kvinder, 1880) was built as an art school for women.
- Copenhagen Central Fire Station (No. 23) was built in 1898.
- The Royal Danish Academy of Sciences and Letters and the Carlsberg Foundation shares the building at No. 35.
- Hotel Nobis Copenhagen /formerly Royal Danish Academy of Music)
- Industriens Hus

== Public art, monuments and memorials ==
- Dante Column
- Little Horn-Blower
