= Royal Horse Guards (Denmark) =

- Livgarden til Hest
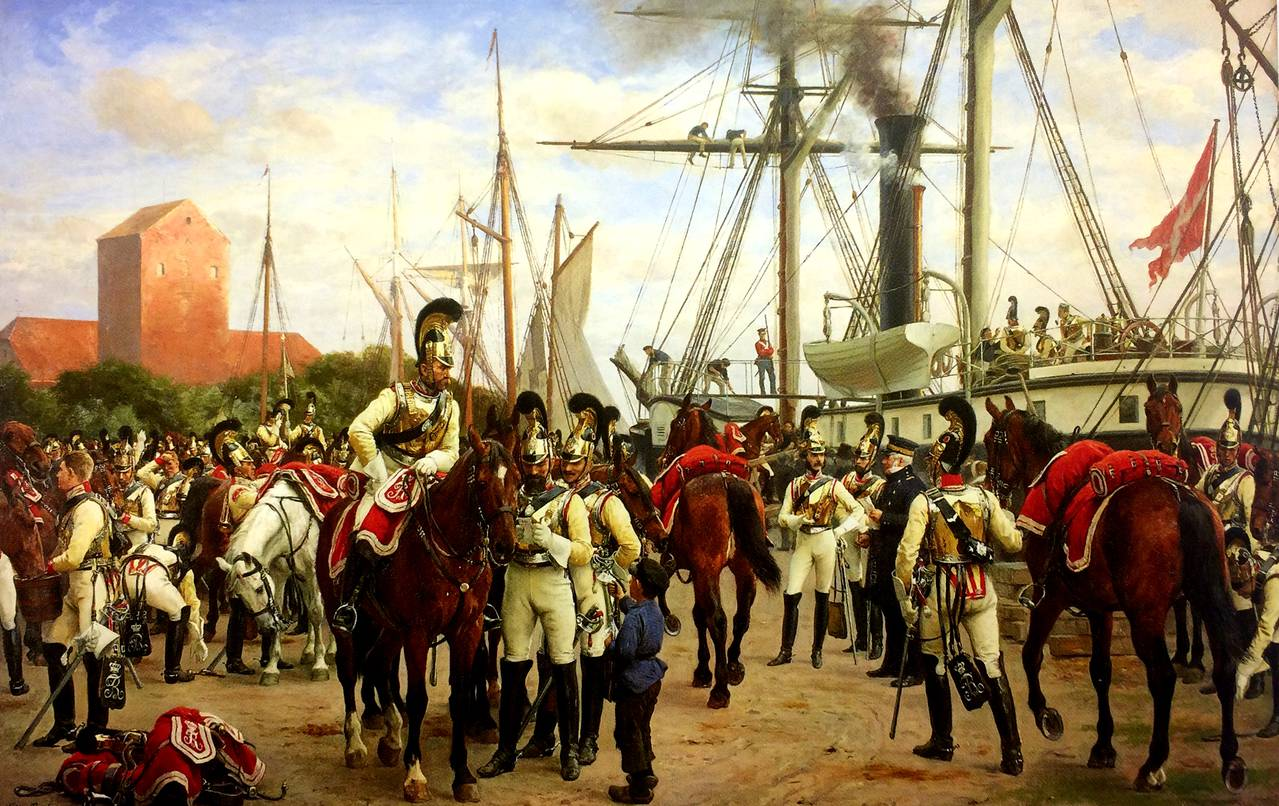
- Royal Horse Guards at Korsør on the way to the front line in Schsleswig during the First Schleswig War in 1848. Painting by Otto Bache from 1888.
- Active: January 1661−31 May 1866 (205 years, 4 months)
- Country: Denmark
- Branch: Royal Danish Army
- Type: Cavalry
- Role: Guard and escort duty
- Size: 675 men at its height in 1714
- Part of: Royal Life Guards
- Garrison/HQ: Hestegardekassernen
- Engagements: The Battle of Helsingborg in 1710; The Battle of Gadebusch in 1712

Commanders
- Notable commanders: Friedrich von Arensdorff

The Royal Horse Guards (Danish: Livgarden til Hest) was a Cuirassier regiment in the Royal Danish Army which was founded on orders from King Frederick III in January 1661 and discontinued on 31 May 1866. It served both as Royal Guards and as a front line cavalry unit.

== History ==
The Royal Danish Horse Guards was founded on orders from King Frederick III in January 1661. They were based at Royal Horse Guards Barracks next to Copenhagen Castle.

The Royal Horse Guards played a particularly active role in the Battle of Helsingborg in 1710 and the Battle of Gadebusch in 1712 during the Great Northern War.

The regiment was disbanded on 31 May 1866. It had served both as Royal Guards and as a front line cavalry unit.

== See also ==
- Royal Life Guards (Denmark)
- Guard Hussar Regiment Mounted Squadron
