= Altinget.dk =

Danish online newspaper

Altinget
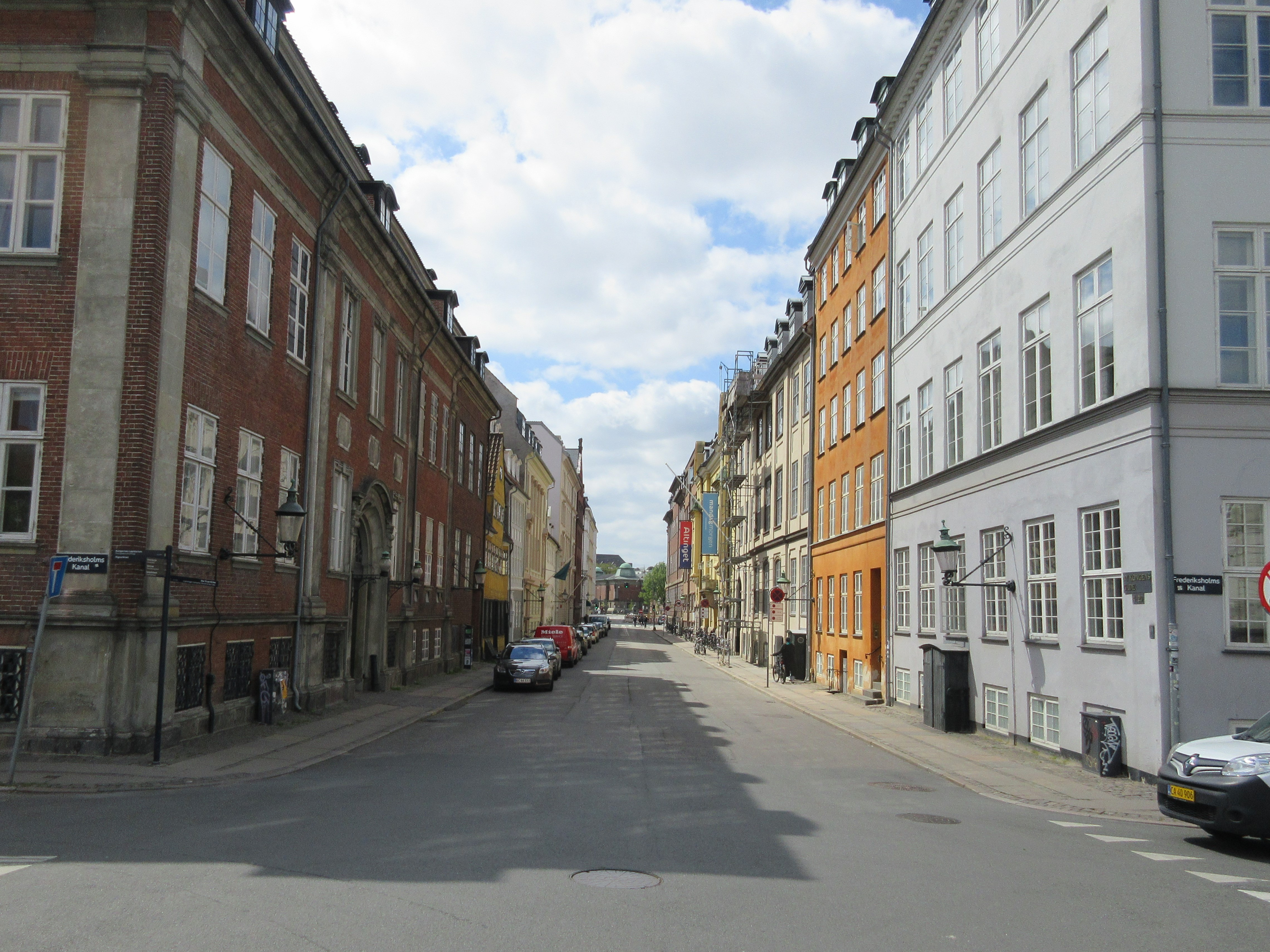
- Ny Kongensgade in Copenhagen where Altinget's logo is visible
- Company type: Independent business
- Industry: Online newspaper
- Founded: 1 January 2000; 26 years ago
- Founder: Rasmus Nielsen
- Headquarters: Ny Kongensgade 10, 1472 København, Denmark
- Area served: Scandinavia
- Website: www.altinget.dk

Altinget.dk or most often simply Altinget is a politically independent Danish online newspaper covering Danish politics. It has are the largest editorial staff at Christiansborg, the home of the Danish Parliament, the Folketing. It has offices on Ny Kongensgade in Copenhagen.

== History ==
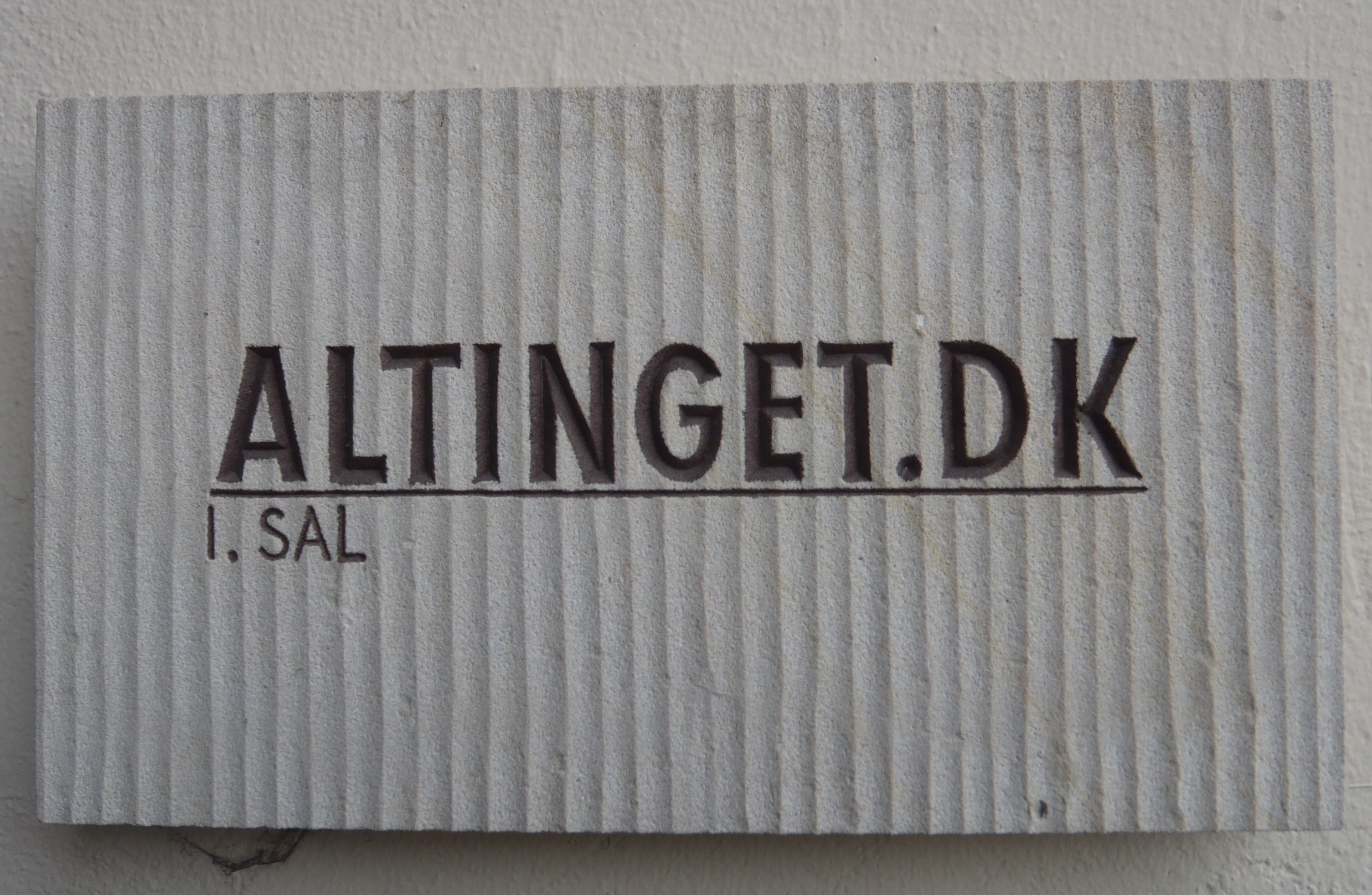
Altinget.dk (1st floor)

Altinget was founded in January 2000 by Rasmus Nielsen, who was the editor-in-chief and managing director from 2000 until 2017. Nielsen remains the owner of Altinget and holds the office of chairman of the media's decision-making executive committee. In 2014, Altinget opened a branch in Sweden with headquarters in its capital Stockholm. Jakob Nielsen was appointed editor-in-chief in 2017. In November 2019, Christoph Nørgaard was appointed Altinget's managing director. In 2022, they also opened in Norway.

== Awards ==
In 2004, the newspaper was the first medium to receive the eJour award from Danmarks Journalisthøjskole in recognition of good internet journalism in Scandinavia. At the 2009 European Parliament election in June (week 23), Altinget topped Danske Specialmedier's list of websites with the most visitors.

In 2010, Altinget received the Anders Bording Media Award.

In 2015, Altinget received the Danish Publicist Club's award for public service. The jury, which consisted of Christian Jensen, Thomas Svaneborg, A.P. Mathiasen, Connie Hedegaard, Jacob Mollerup, Per Mikael Jensen, Elisabet Svane, Kim Hundevadt and Jacob Moll gave the award.
