= Royal Horse Guards Barracks (Copenhagen) =

Coordinates: 55°40′24″N 12°34′41″E

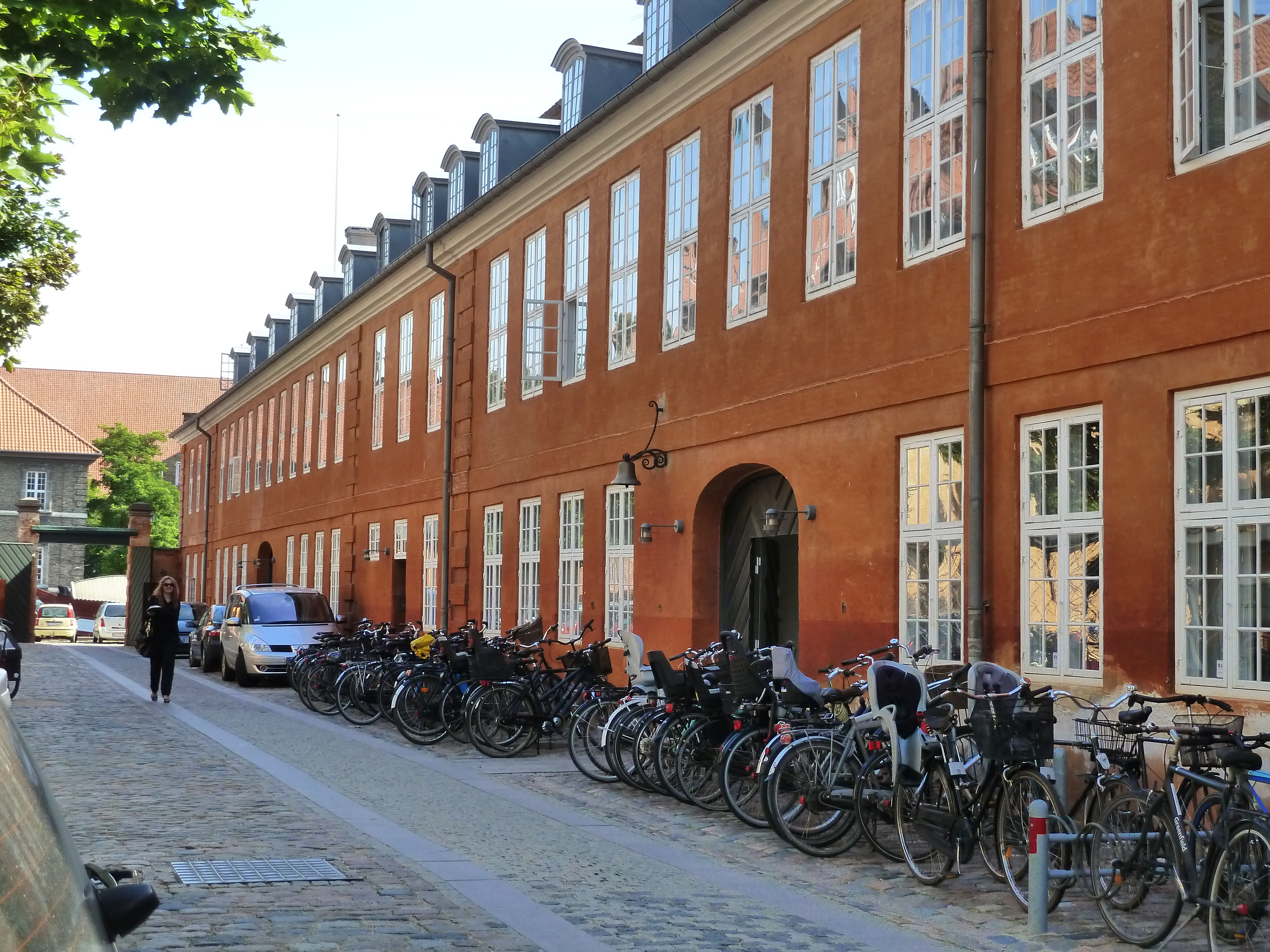
The Royal Horse Guards Barracks

The Royal Horse Guards Barracks (Danish: Hestegardekassernen), at 26 Frederiksholms Kanal in Copenhagen, Denmark, served as barracks for the Royal Horse Guards from 1792 until 1866. The building is located along the south side of a gated alleyway which connects Frederiksholm Canal to Vester Voldgade. Together with Civiletatens Materialgård and Fæstningens Materialgård, it forms a cluster of low, yellow-washed buildings all of which are listed, on the Zealand side of the canal, opposite the small island Slotsholmen with Christiansborg Palace. The Hay Storage Building at the end of the barracks building, facing Vester Voldgade, originally stored hay for the King's horses at the Royal Stables but later also served the Royal Horse Guards. Both the Royal Horse Guards Barracks and the Hay Storage building are now used by the Ministry of Education.

== History ==
=== The Royal Horse Guards Barracks ===
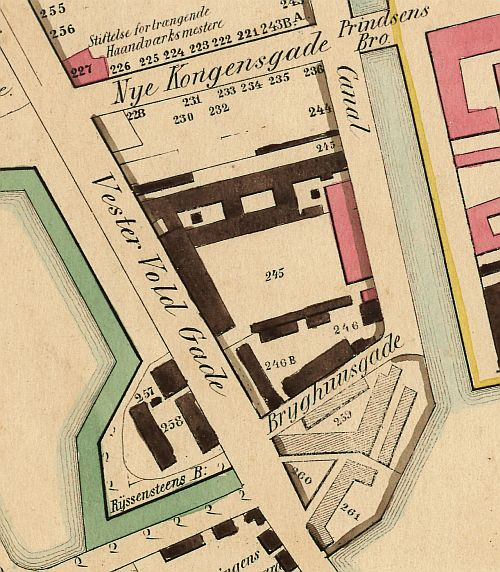
the Royal Horse Guard Barracks seen on a map detail.

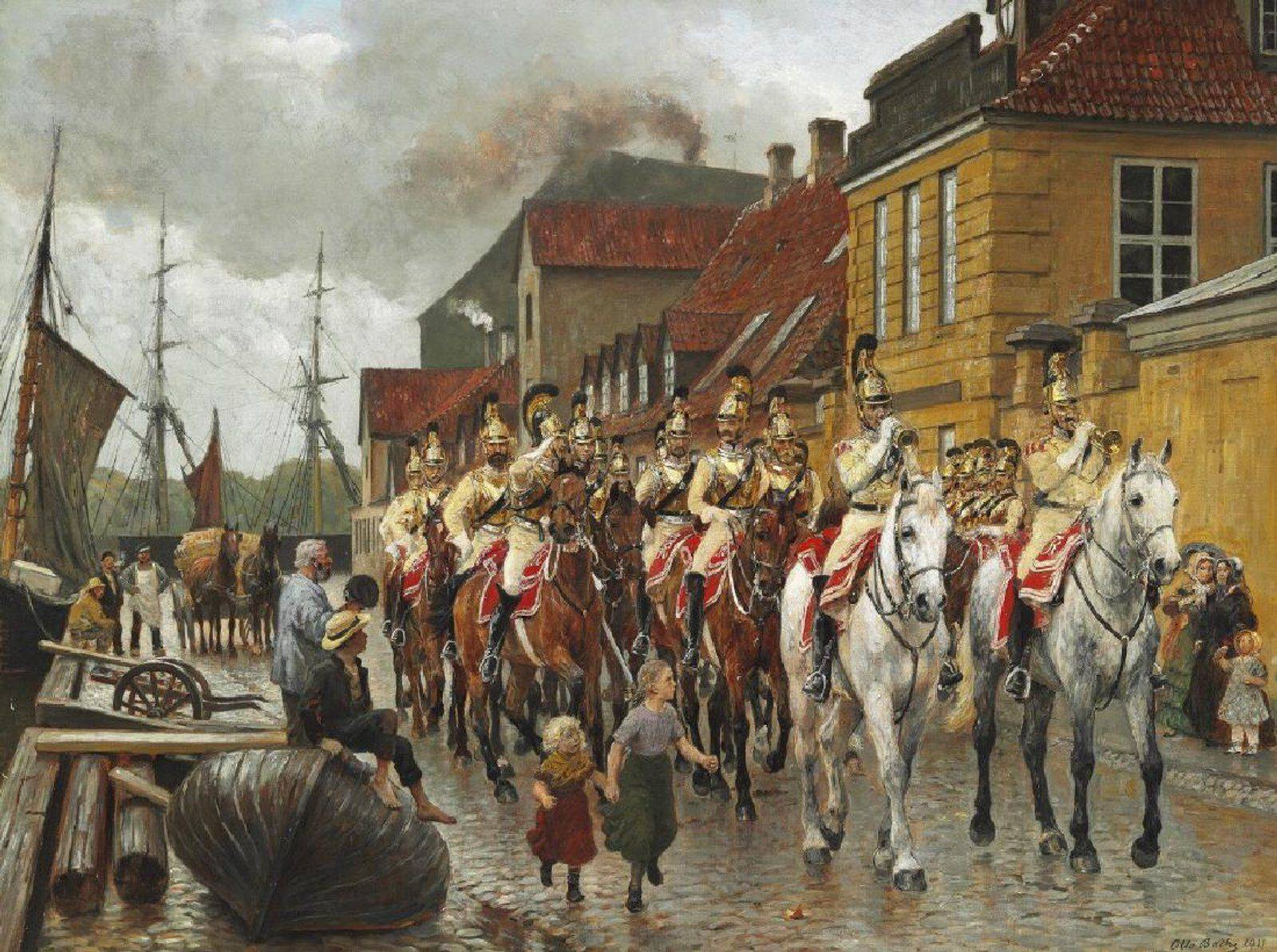
The Royal Horse Guards at Frederiksholm Canal, painting by Otto Bache

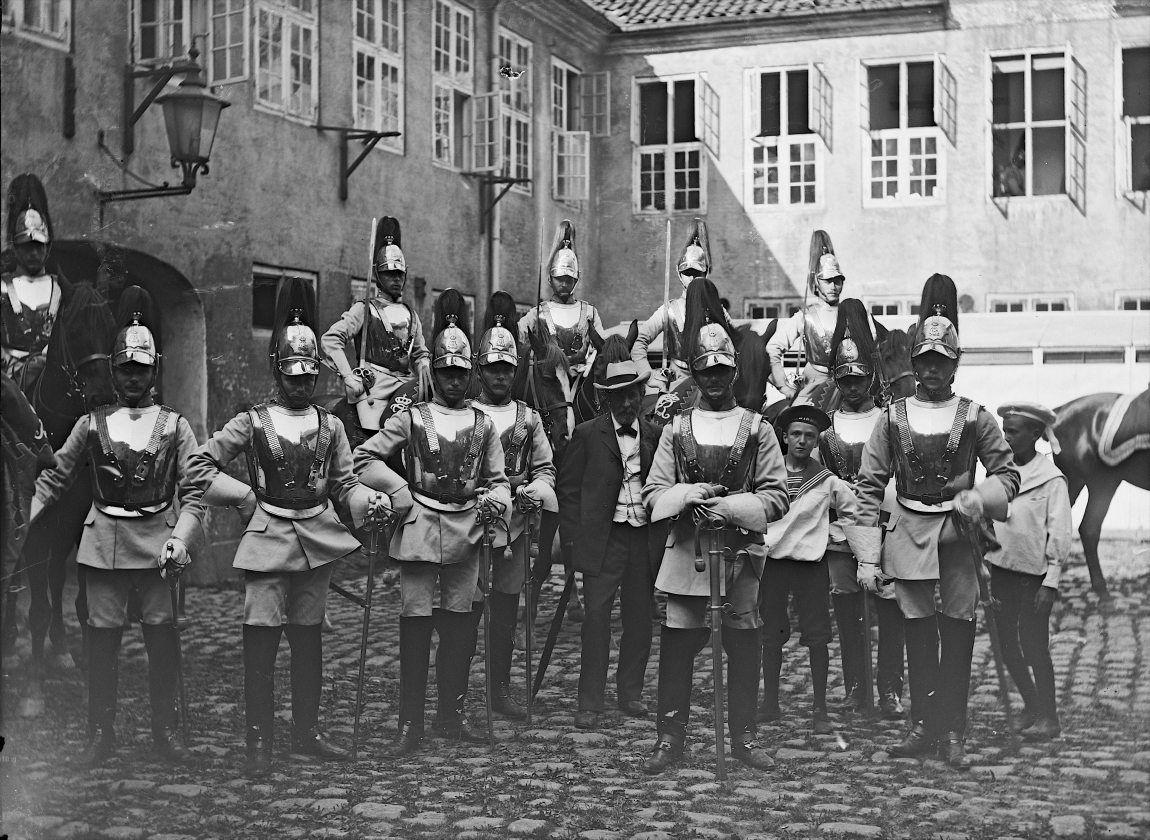
Royal Horse Guards photographed at the barracks on 27 July 1908

The Royal Horse Guards were from 1755 based at Gardergården in Vestergade (No. 18). The complex had room for 77 horses and was privately owned. Garvergården remained in use until it had become too small in 1792 and the building was destroyed in the Copenhagen Fire of 1795 a few years later. The new barracks at Frederiksholms Kanal were designed by court architect Andreas Kirkerup and built on a narrow strip of land which had until then been part of Civiletatens Materialgård's grounds. The new barracks were conveniently situated, close to Christiansborg Palace on the other side of the canal where the regiment served as royal guards. The building was hit by a fire in 1798 but subsequently rebuilt that same year. The composer Hans Christian Lumbye had a residence in the building in about 1842.

=== Later use ===
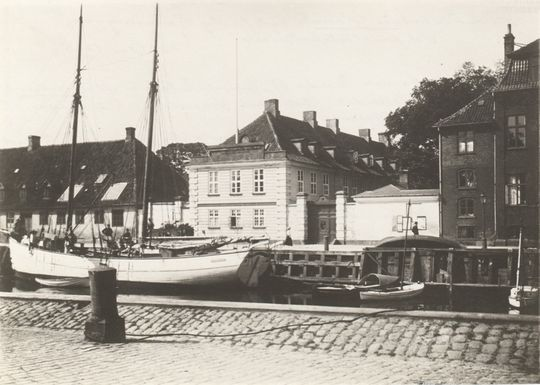
The Artillery Barracks in the late 19th century

The Royal Horse Guards were disbanded in 1866 and in 1969 the 2nd Artillery Regiment took over the premises which were then known as the Artillery Barracks until 1925 when they relocated to a new installation at Artillerivej on Amager at the other side of the harbour.

The building was then taken over by the Ministry of Education. Many other institutions or individuals rented rooms in the building during the following years.

== Architecture ==
=== Royal Horse Guards Barracks ===
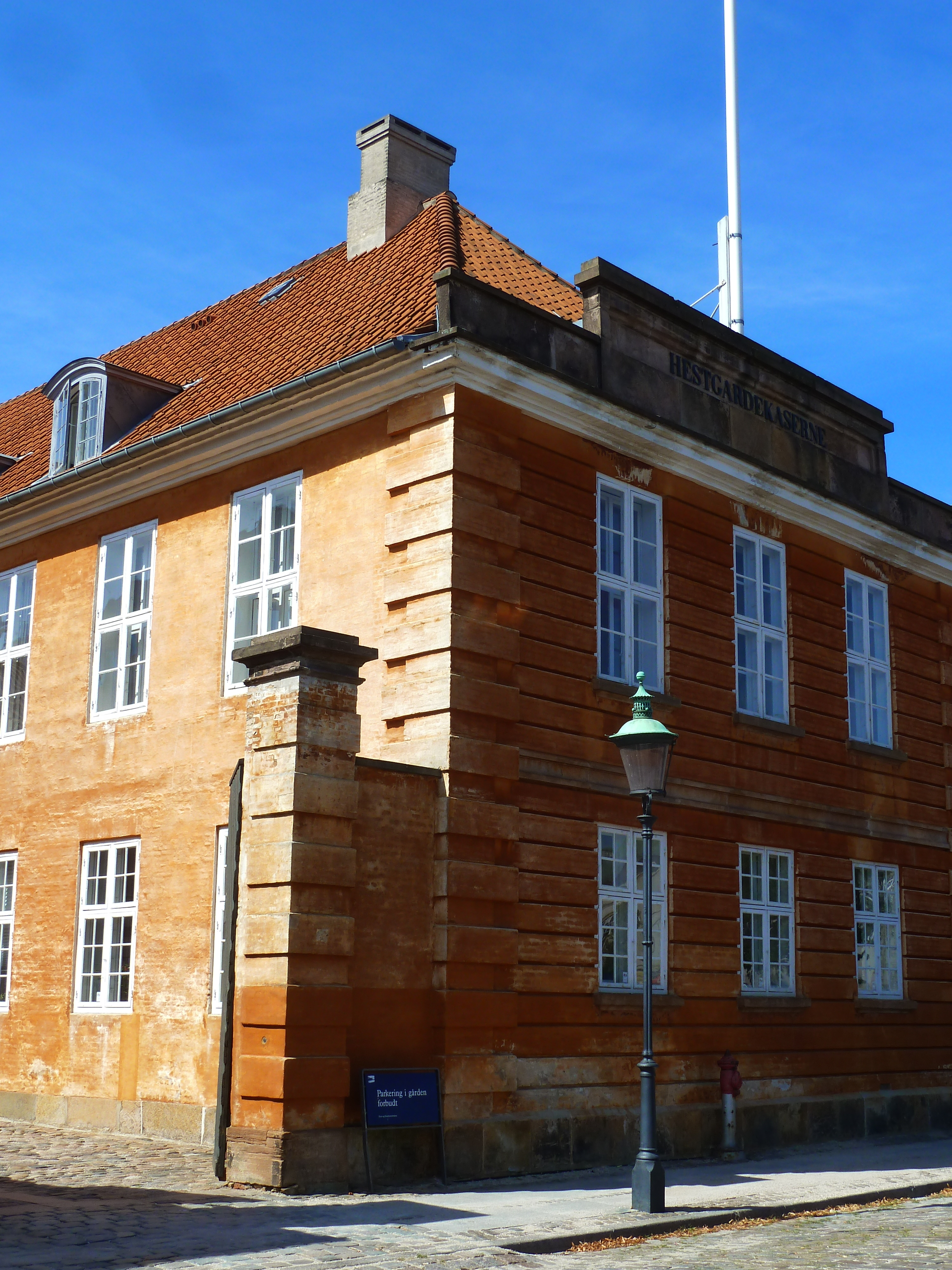
The barracks viewed from the canal with the gate that opens onto one of the three gates to its rear

The building is a long, 2-storey wing which runs from Frederiksholm Canal to the Hay Storage Building on Vester Voldgade and is accessed from a cobbled alleyway with a gate in each end, connecting the two streets. The facade stands in orange-washed masonry divided by lesenes but otherwise has little ornamentation. It is topped by a red tile roof with many dormer windows.

This main wing is to the rear connected to a parallel building part of Civiletatens Materialgård by several short rear wings, forming three interior courtyard spaces, the one closest to the canal entered directly from Frederiksholms Kanal and the two others through arched gateways in the barracks building. The ground floor was originally used for stables while there was residential quarters on the first floor and feed storage in the attic.

The buildings were listed by the Danish Heritage Agency in 1918, together with Civiletatens materialgård, and underwent restoration work conducted by Arkitema in 1996-97.

=== Hay Storage Building ===
The Hay Storage Building (Hømagasinet), at 199 Vestervoldgade, its gable facing the alleyway, was originally built in 1740 for storage of hay for the King's Horses. The Royal Stables were located at Christiansborg Palace but fire hazard displaced the hay storage to the other side of the canal. The Hay Storage Building was destroyed in the fire 1798 fire which also hit the barracks building, and after that also stored hay for the Royal Horse Guards' horses. Much of the building was demolished in 1939 to make way for the Post Giro Building which was built to a design by Thorvald Jørgensen.

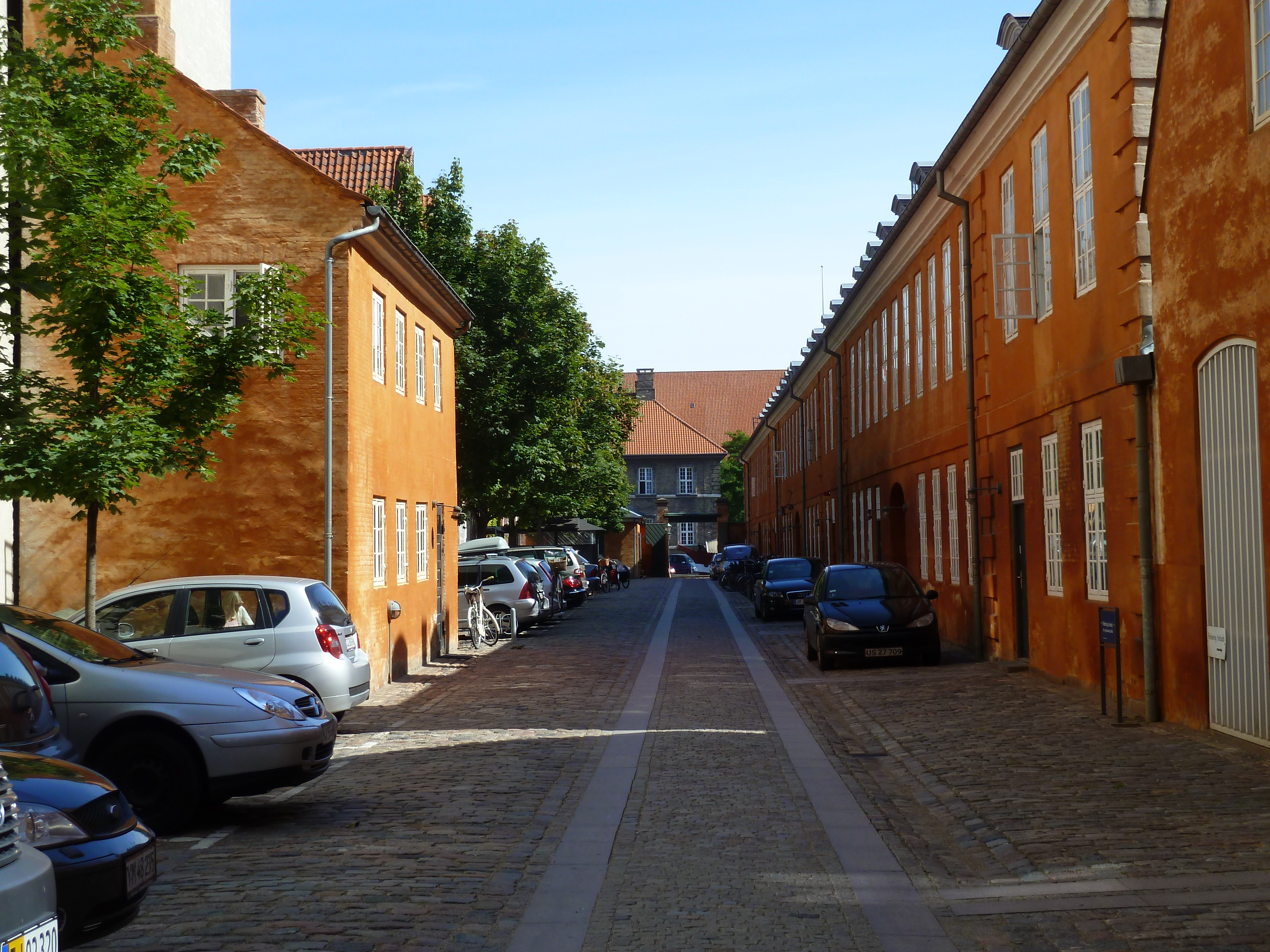
The alley in front of the building

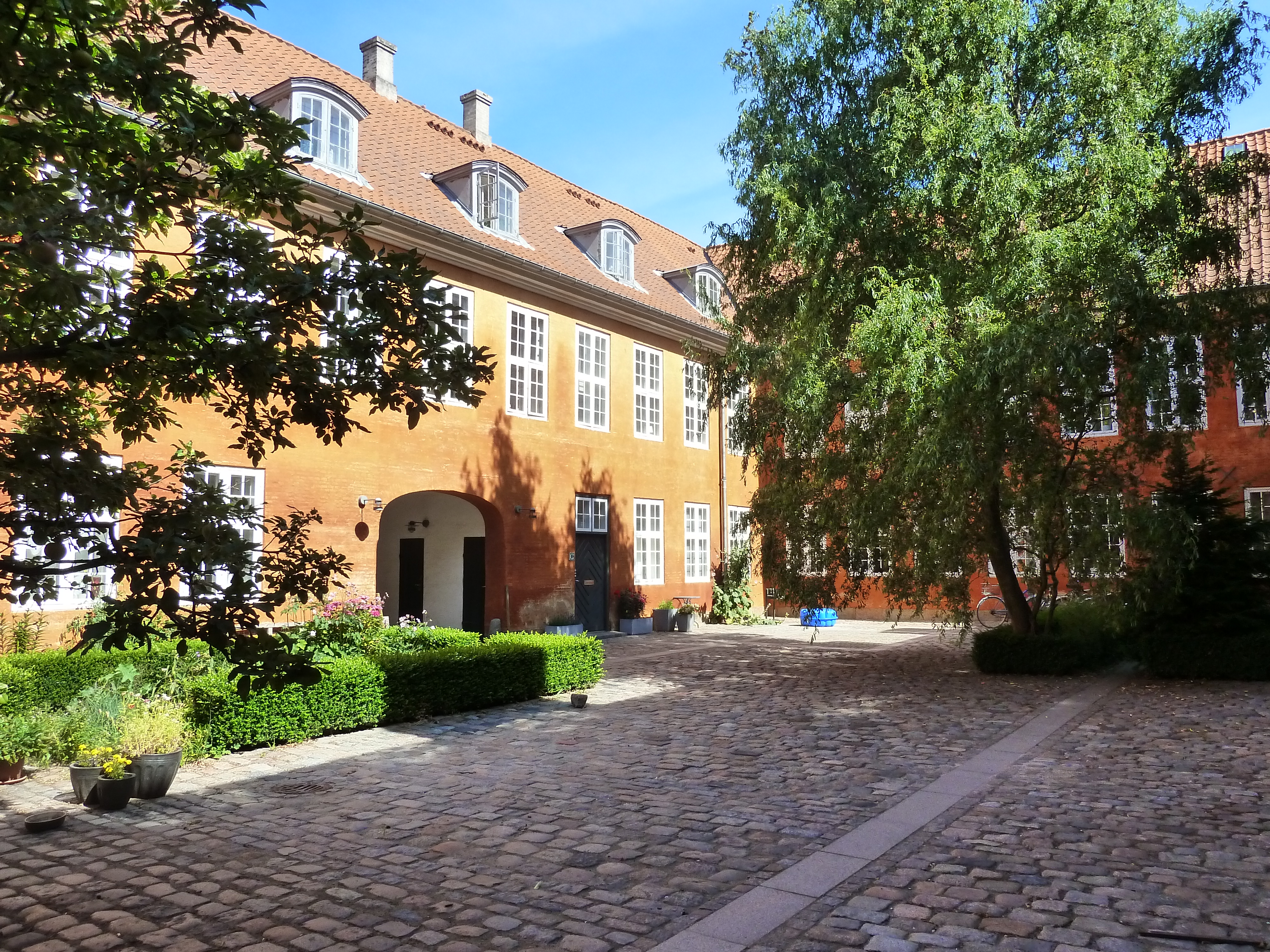
One of the courtyards to the rear of the building

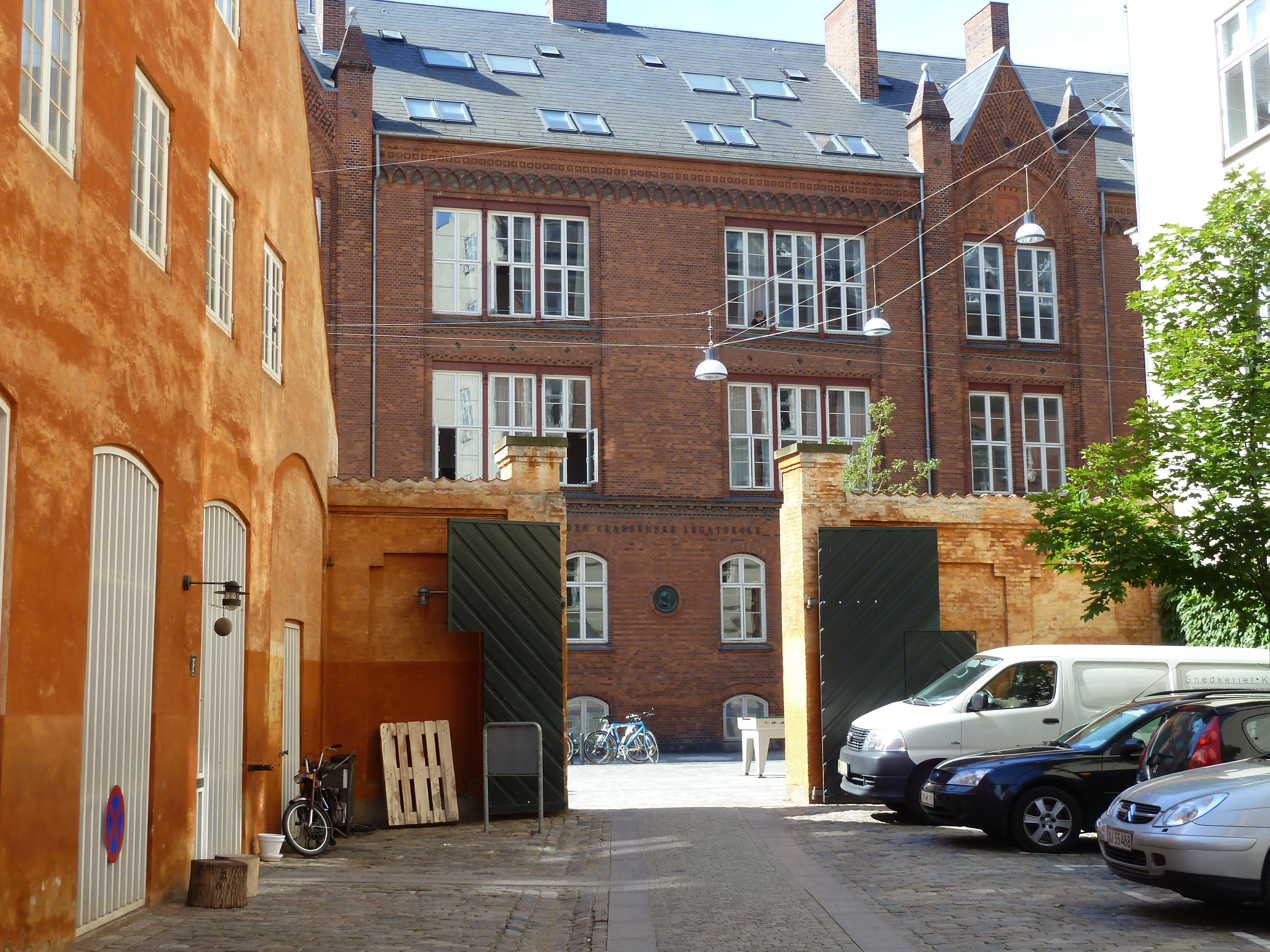
The gate towards Vester Voldgade and to the left the gable of the Hay Storage Building

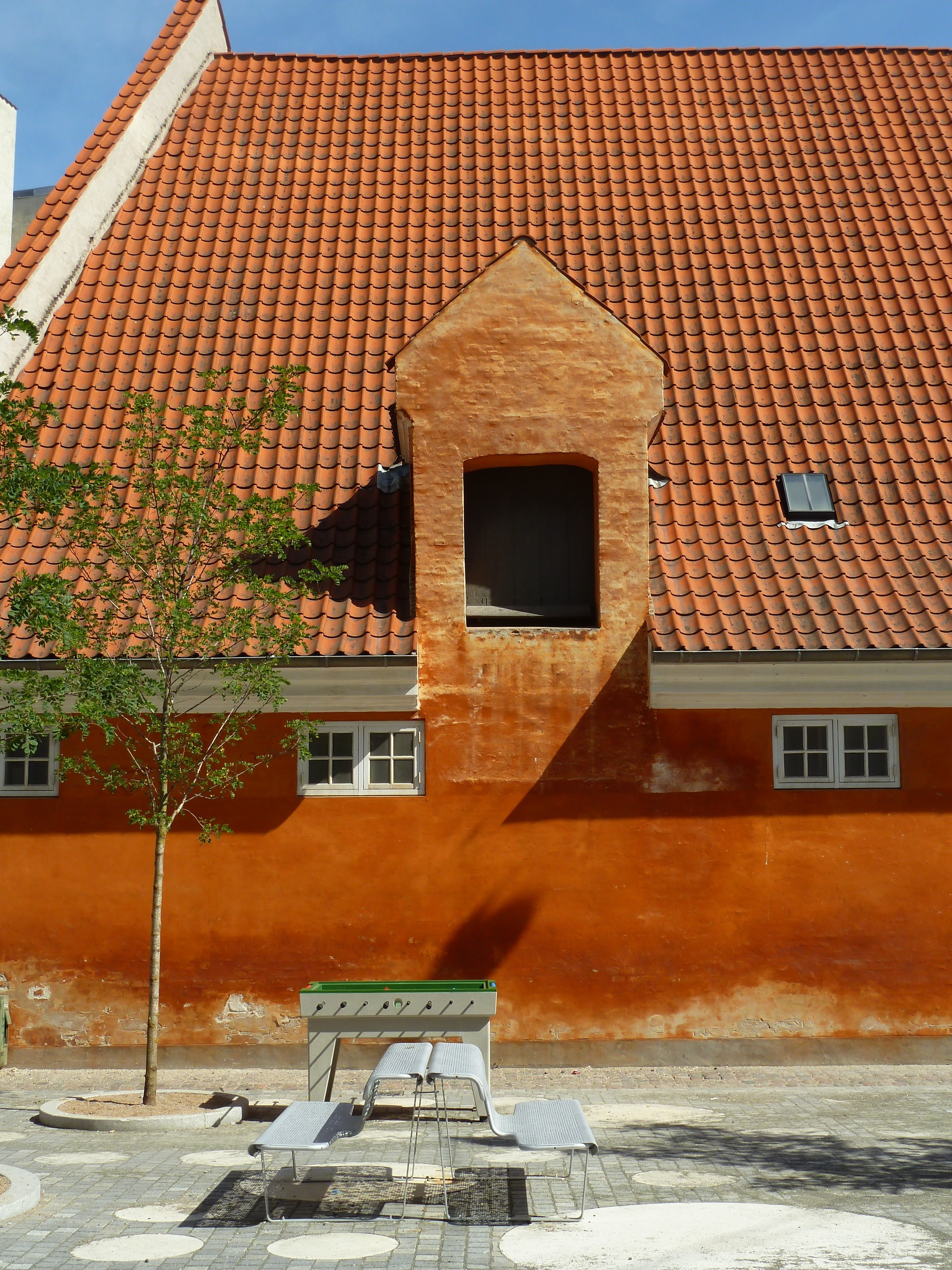
The Hay Storage Building seen from Vester Voldgade

== The Horse Guard Barracks today ==
The building has been used by the Ministry of Education since 1927. Today it houses most of the Education Agency. There are also a number of residences facing the courtyard closest to Vester Voldgade.

== See also ==
- Østerfælled Barracks
- Old Artillery Barracks, Christianshavn
