= Rådhuspladsen station =

Railway station in Copenhagen Municipality, Denmark

Coordinates: 55.6764°N 12.5681°E

Rådhuspladsen
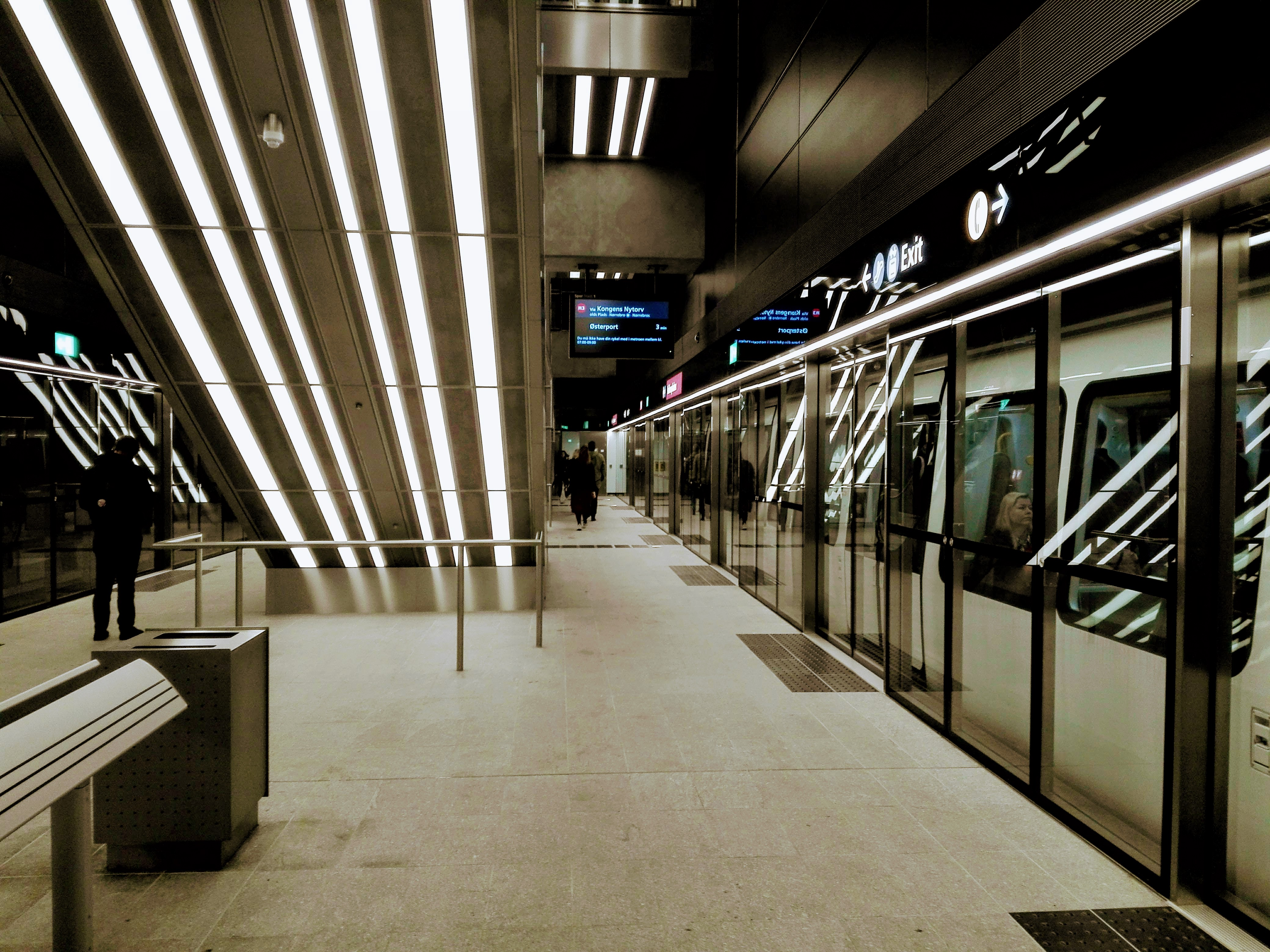
- Rådhuspladsen Station

General information
- Location: Rådhuspladsen; 1550 København V Denmark
- System: Copenhagen Metro rapid transit station
- Owner: Metroselskabet
- Platforms: 1 island platform
- Tracks: 2
- Bus routes: 11, 23, 33, 2A, 5C, 250S, 93N, 94N, 97N

Construction
- Structure type: Underground
- Accessible: yes

Other information
- Station code: Rs
- Fare zone: 1

History
- Opened: 29 September 2019; 7 years ago
Location
- Location within Copenhagen Location within Greater Copenhagen Location within Denmark

Rådhuspladsen station (Danish pronunciation: [ˈʁʌðhusˌpʰlæsn̩], lit. City Hall Square) is an underground Copenhagen Metro station located on City Hall Square in central Copenhagen, Denmark. The station is on the City Circle Line (M3 and M4), between Gammel Strand and Copenhagen Central Station, and is in fare zone 1.

Nearby landmarks include Copenhagen City Hall, the southwestern end of Strøget, Tivoli Gardens, the National Museum of Denmark and the Ny Carlsberg Glyptotek 9.

== History ==
Construction on Rådhuspladsen station began in 2009. It is opened on 29 September 2019 along with the rest of the City Circle Line. During the station's construction, a work site took over the western half of the square to allow for excavation and station shell construction.

== Design ==
The main staircase is located adjacent to Vester Voldgade and faces the tower of the Coty Hall. A secondary staircase faces H. C. Andersens Boulevard. The escalator shaft is clad with black, ceramic panels.

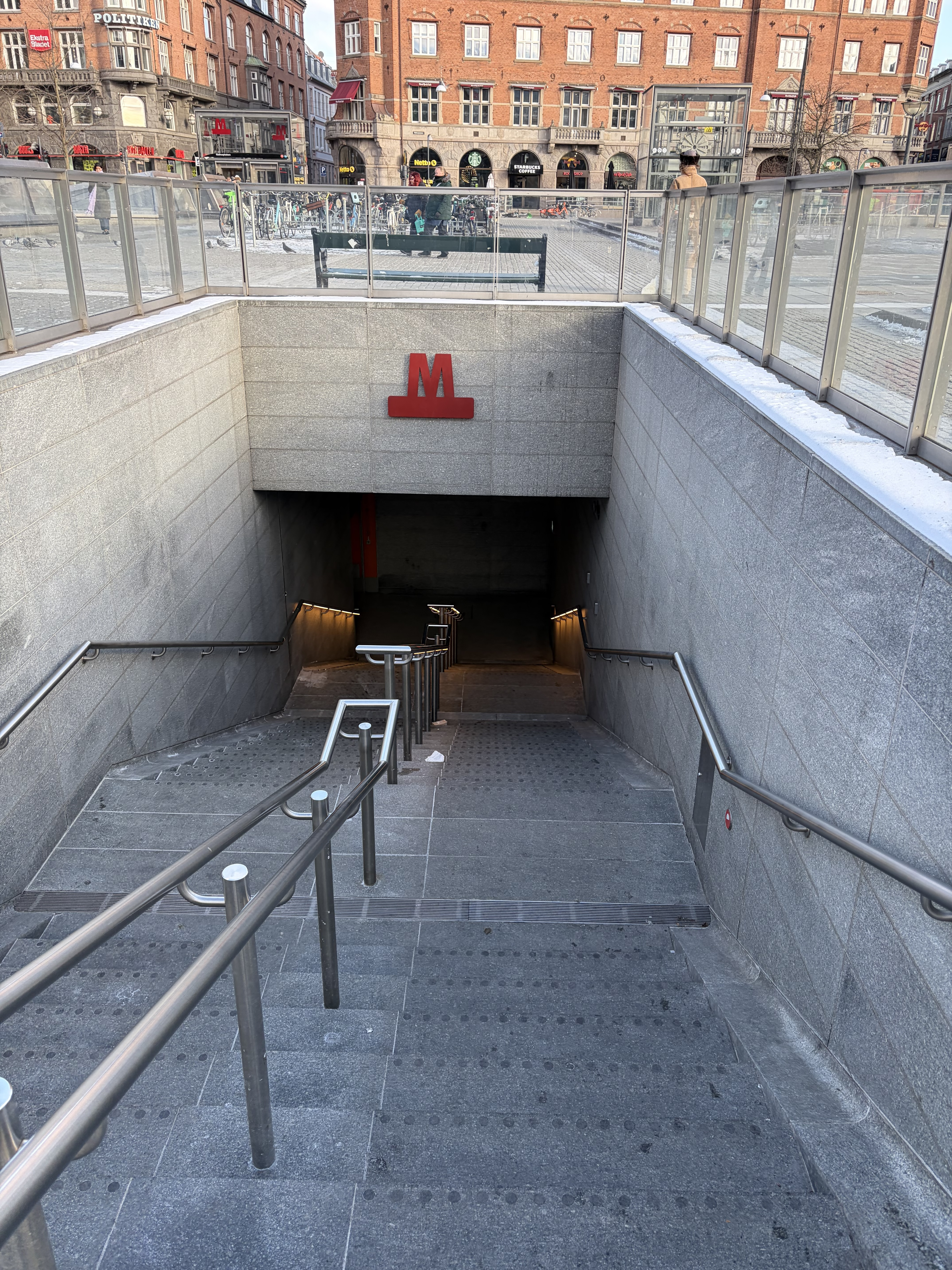
Entry stairs near H.C. Andersens Boulevard.

== Transport links ==
Bus routes 10, 12, 14, 26, 33, 2A, 6A, 5V, 250S, 93N, 94N and 97N serve the station.

== Service ==
Preceding station	Copenhagen Metro	Following station
Copenhagen Central clockwise	M3	Gammel Strand counter-clockwise
Copenhagen Central towards Copenhagen South	M4	Gammel Strand towards Orientkaj
