= Nobis Hotel Copenhagen =

Hotel in central Copenhagen, Denmark

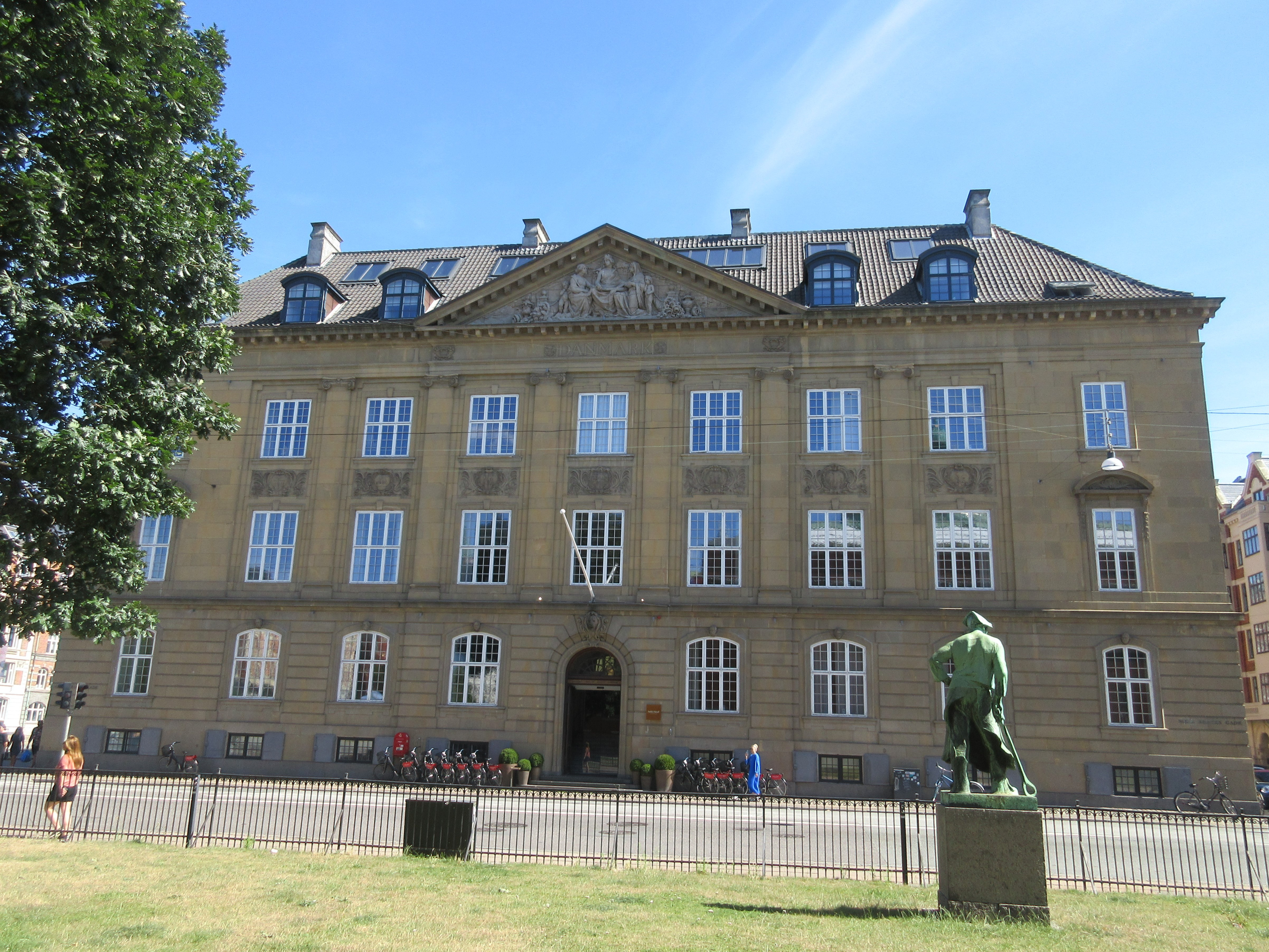
- The hotel viewed from the garden of the Ny Carlsberg Glyptotek in 2022.
- Interactive map of the Nobis Hotel Copenhagen area

General information
- Location: Niels Brocks Gade 1, 1574 København V
- Completed: 1903
- Opening: 2017; 9 years ago

Dimensions
- Other dimensions: 105 metres (length)

Technical details
- Floor count: 6

Hotel Nobis Copenhagen is an upscale hotel in central Copenhagen, Denmark.

== History ==
The building was constructed for the Royal Danish Academy of Music in 1903. It was designed by Martin Borch who served as Royal Building Inspector from 1903 to 1923. The Royal Music Academy relocated to Radiohuset in 2008. The building was acquired by the Swedish property company Balder in 2015. The architectural firm AI was subsequently responsible for adapting it for use as a hotel. Nobis Hotel Copenhagen opened in 2017.

== Today ==
Wingårdhs has been in charge of interior design.
