= Gammel Strand station =

Metro station in Copenhagen, Denmark

Coordinates: 55.6778°N 12.5797°E

Gammel Strand
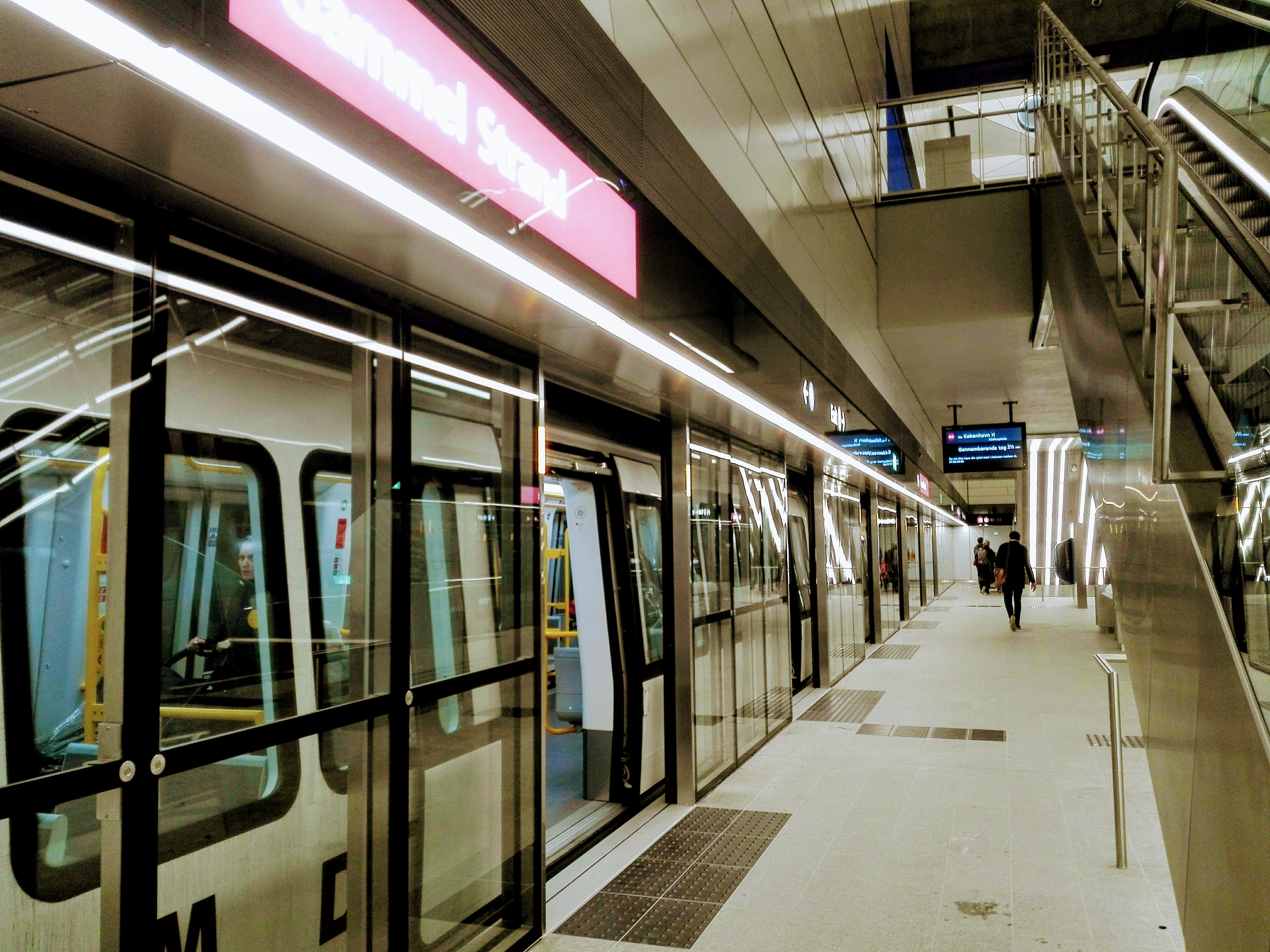
- Gammel Strand Station

General information
- Location: Gammel Strand; 1202 Copenhagen K Denmark
- System: Copenhagen Metro rapid transit station
- Owner: Metroselskabet
- Platforms: 1 island platform
- Tracks: 2

Construction
- Structure type: Underground
- Accessible: yes

Other information
- Fare zone: 1

History
- Opened: 29 September 2019; 7 years ago
Location
- Location within Copenhagen Location within Greater Copenhagen Location within Denmark

Gammel Strand station (Danish pronunciation: [ˈkɑml̩ ˈstʁɑnˀ], lit. Old Beach) is a Copenhagen Metro station located at Gammel Strand in the Old Town of Copenhagen, Denmark. The station is on the City Circle Line (M3 and M4), between Kongens Nytorv and Rådhuspladsen, and is in fare zone 1. The station provides access to the central section of Strøget, Slotsholmen, Christiansborg Palace and Højbro Plads.

== History ==
Construction on the station began in 2009. It was opened on 29 September 2019 along with the rest of the City Circle Line.

== Design ==
The station is constructed underneath Slotsholmen Canal. The main entrance faces Højbro Plads. The escalator is longer than those of the other stations. The walls are faced with a combination of glazed and unglazed pale, ceramic panels which, in combination with blue lighting, is supposed to evoke an underwater feeling.

== Service ==
Preceding station	Copenhagen Metro	Following station
Rådhuspladsen clockwise	M3	Kongens Nytorv counter-clockwise
Rådhuspladsen towards Copenhagen South	M4	Kongens Nytorv towards Orientkaj
