= Vester Voldgade =

Street in Copenhagen, Denmark

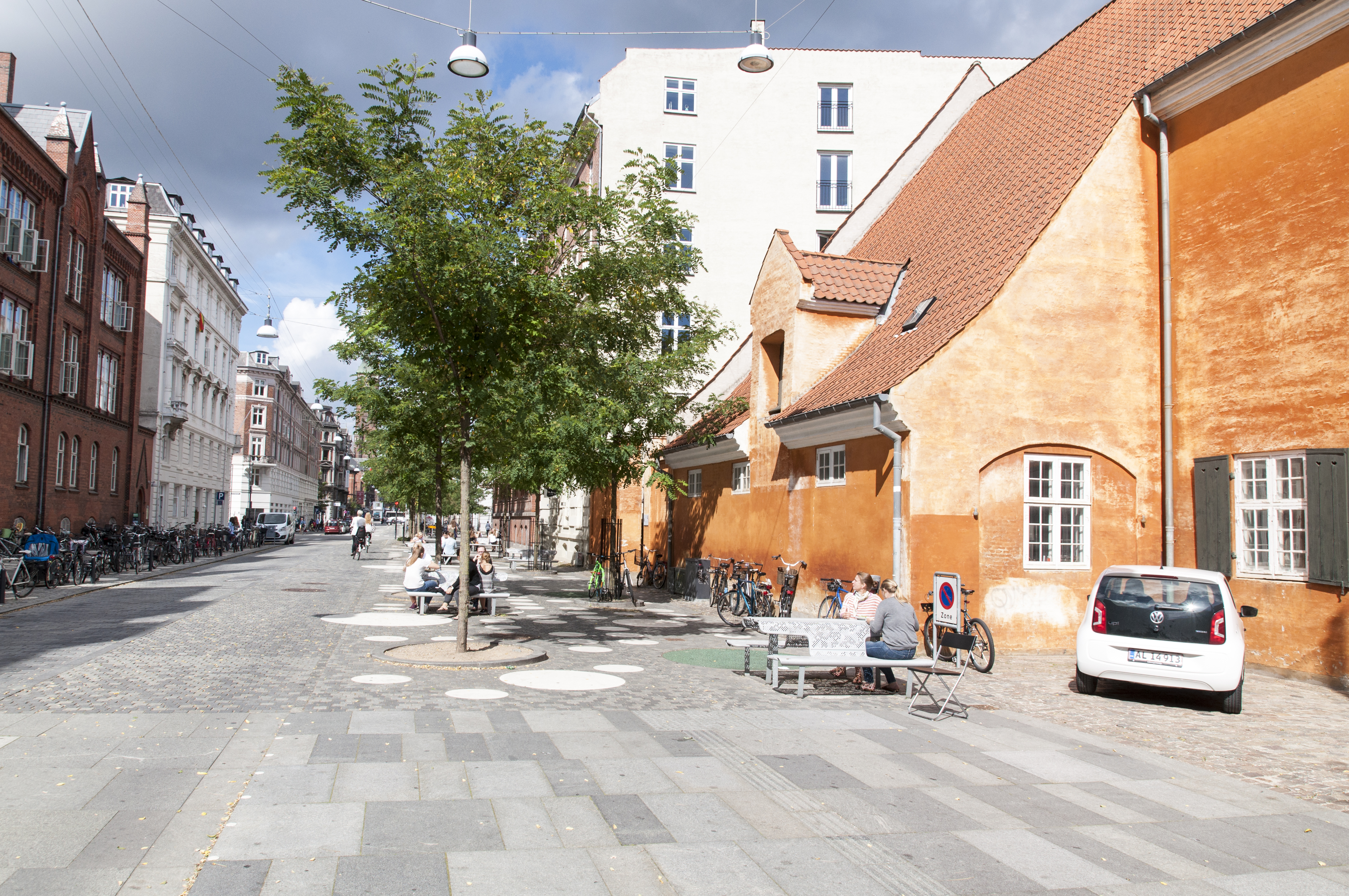
- Vester Voldgade with the Copenhagen Town hall tower
- Length: 1,130 m (3,710 ft)
- Location: Copenhagen, Denmark
- Quarter: City centre
- Postal code: 1552
- Nearest metro station: Rådhuspladsen
- Coordinates: 55°40′29.8″N 12°34′19.38″E
- Northwest end: Jarmers Plads
- Major junctions: City Hall Square
- Southeast end: Christians Brygge

Vester Voldgade (lit. "West Rampart Street") is a street in Copenhagen, Denmark which runs from Jarmers Plads to the waterfront between Frederiksholms Kanal and Langebro, passing the City Hall Square on the way.

Together with Nørre Voldgade and Øster Voldgade it forms a traffic artery which arches around the Zealand side of central Copenhagen all the way to Kastellet (at Oslo Plads on the coast north of the city centre. The three streets follow the course of Copenhagen's long gone Bastioned Fortification Ring and thus marks the transition between the Old Town and the new neighbourhoods that developed after the fortifications were removed in the second half of the 19th century.

== History ==
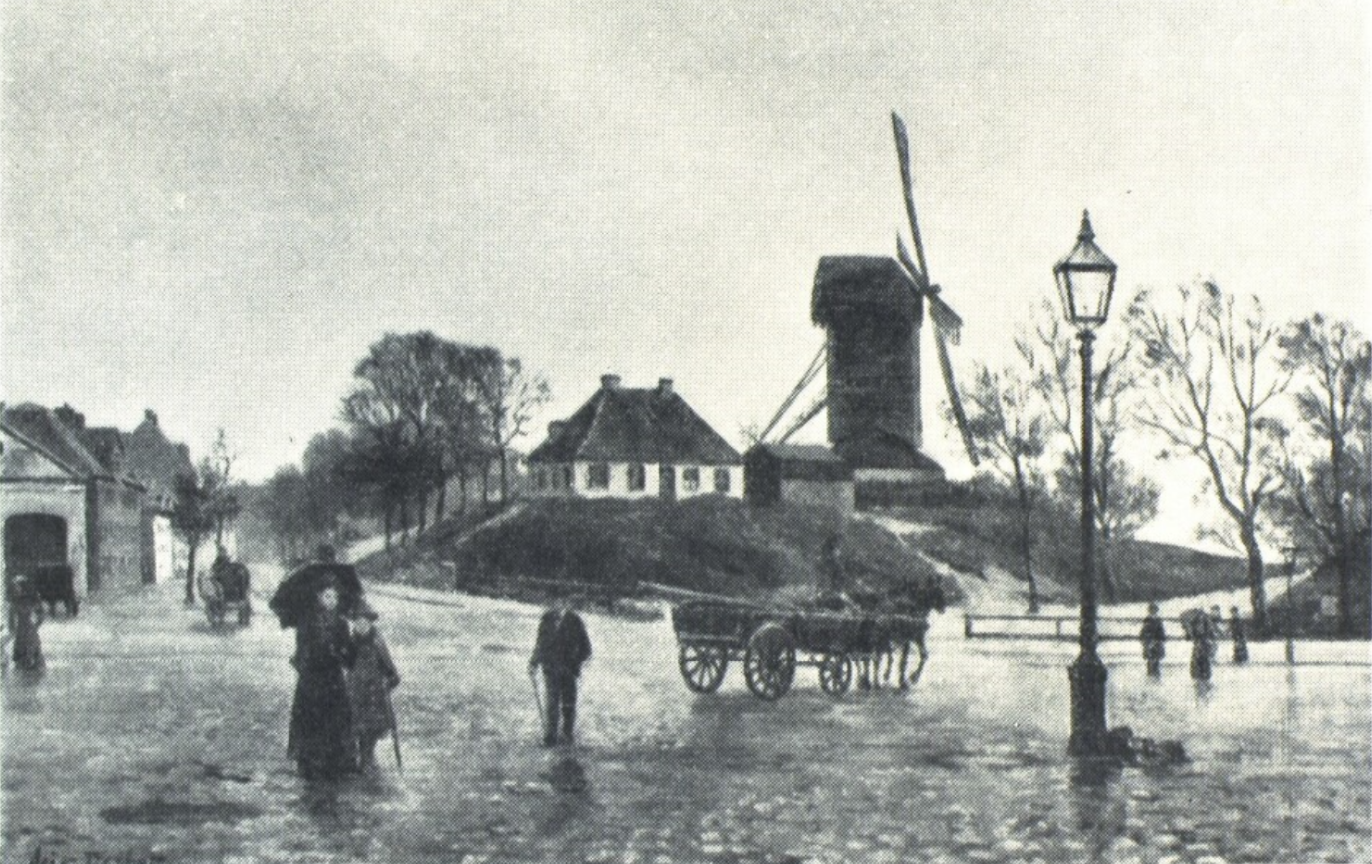
The Philosopher's Path seen from the Haymarket, with Lucia Mill on one side and Vejerboden on the other

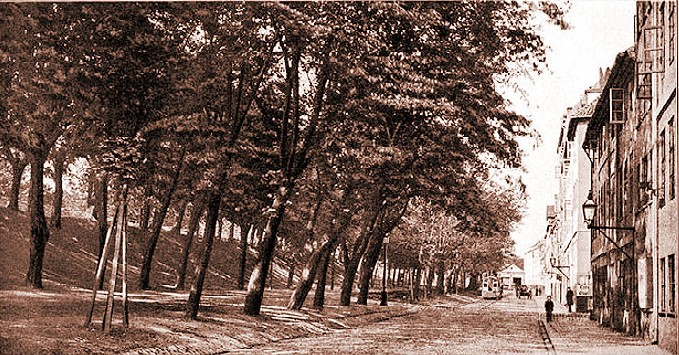
The street in about 1880

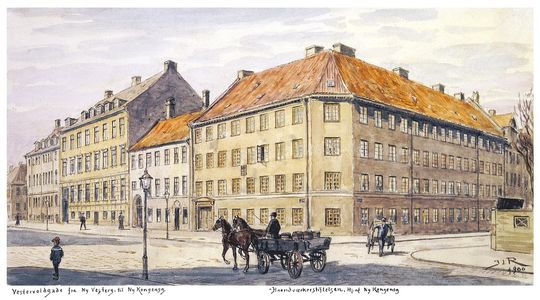
Håndværkerstiftelsen's building on the corner of Vester Voldgade and Ny Kongensgade, 1900

Vester Voldgade was originally a narrow alley which ran along the inner margin of Copenhagen's West Rampart, part of the Bastioned Fortification Ring which enclosed Copenhagen. The city's haymarket was located at the site of the current City Hall Square until the New Haymarket was inaugurated on 1 January 1888. The section from the haymarket to the harbour was originally known as Filosofgangen (English: Philosopher's Path). That section of the ramparts was one of the last to be decommissioned, surviving until 1885. Lange Bridge was located at the far end of the street until 1903 when it was moved to the end of Vestre Boulevard (now H. C. Andersens Boulevard).

== Notable buildings and residents ==
No. 11 was built for Niels Gade's Music Academy in 1887 in the Renaissance Revival style by Christian L Thuren. It now houses the Russian Center of Science and Culture. No. 19 and 21 are both from the late 1790s and are listed. Hotel Kong Frederik at No. 23-25 first opened in 1900. The building was designed by Phillip Smidth who also designed Politikens Hus on the corner with Vestergade in 1904–07. The newspaper Politiken has been based in the building since 1912. Vester Voldgade Voldgade 33 is a Functionalist extension from 1934.

The low yellow building at No. 119 is a former hay storage from about 1799, part of the Royal Horse Guards Barracks. The building was originally considerably longer but was shortened when Thorvald Jørgensen's Post Giro Building (No. 133) was built in 1938. The 45-bay, half-timbered building on the other side of the Post Giro Building, part of Fæstningens Materialgård, a former military storage facility, is from 1748.

Vester Voldgade School (89) was completed in 1890 to a design by Ludvig Fenger. It has housed Den Classenske Legatskole since 1938. The low building on the corner of Stormgade (Stormgade 18) was the first home of Overformynderiet which later moved to a new building on Holmens Kanal. The building was designed by Hans Jørgen Holm and is from 1884.

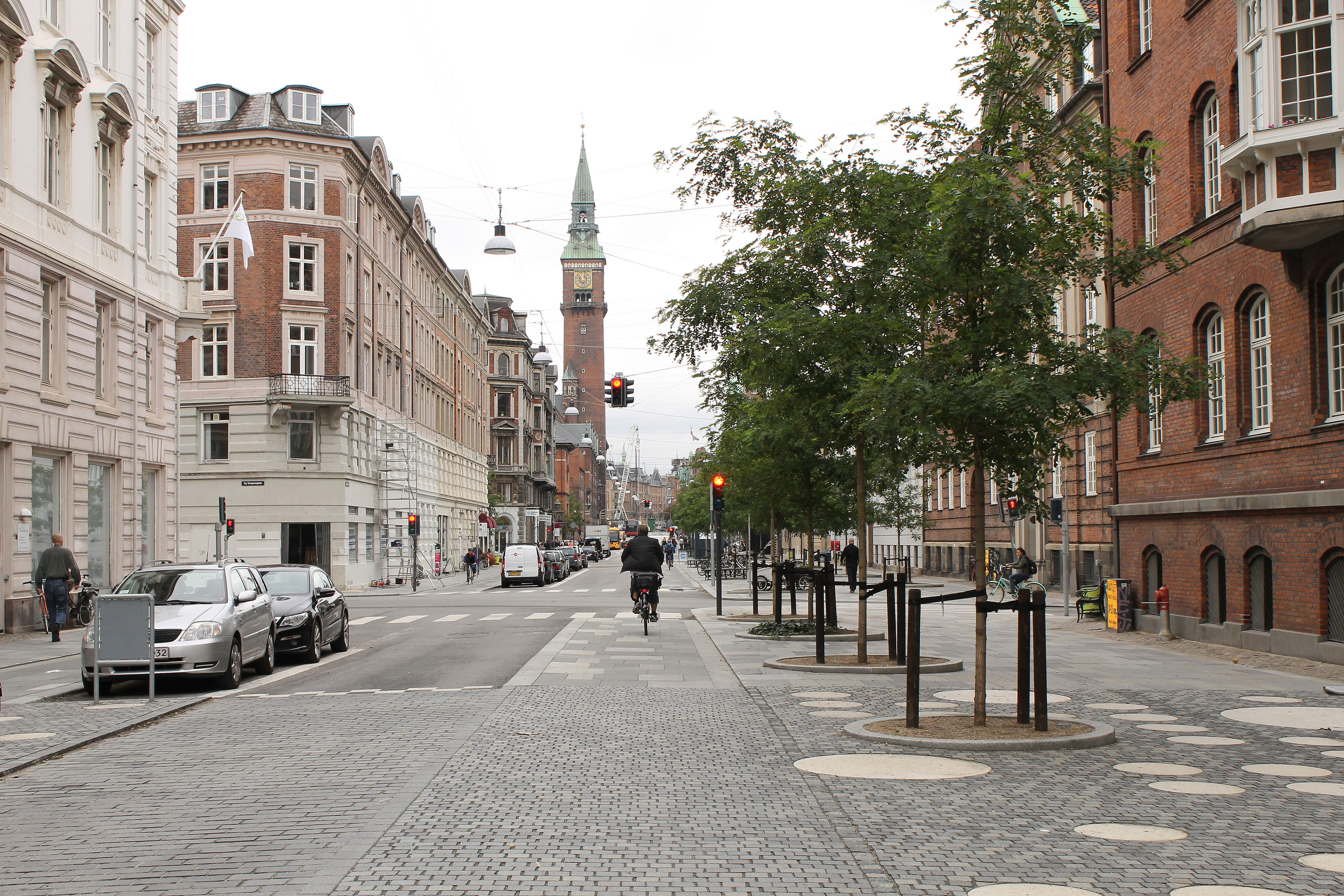
The renovated street

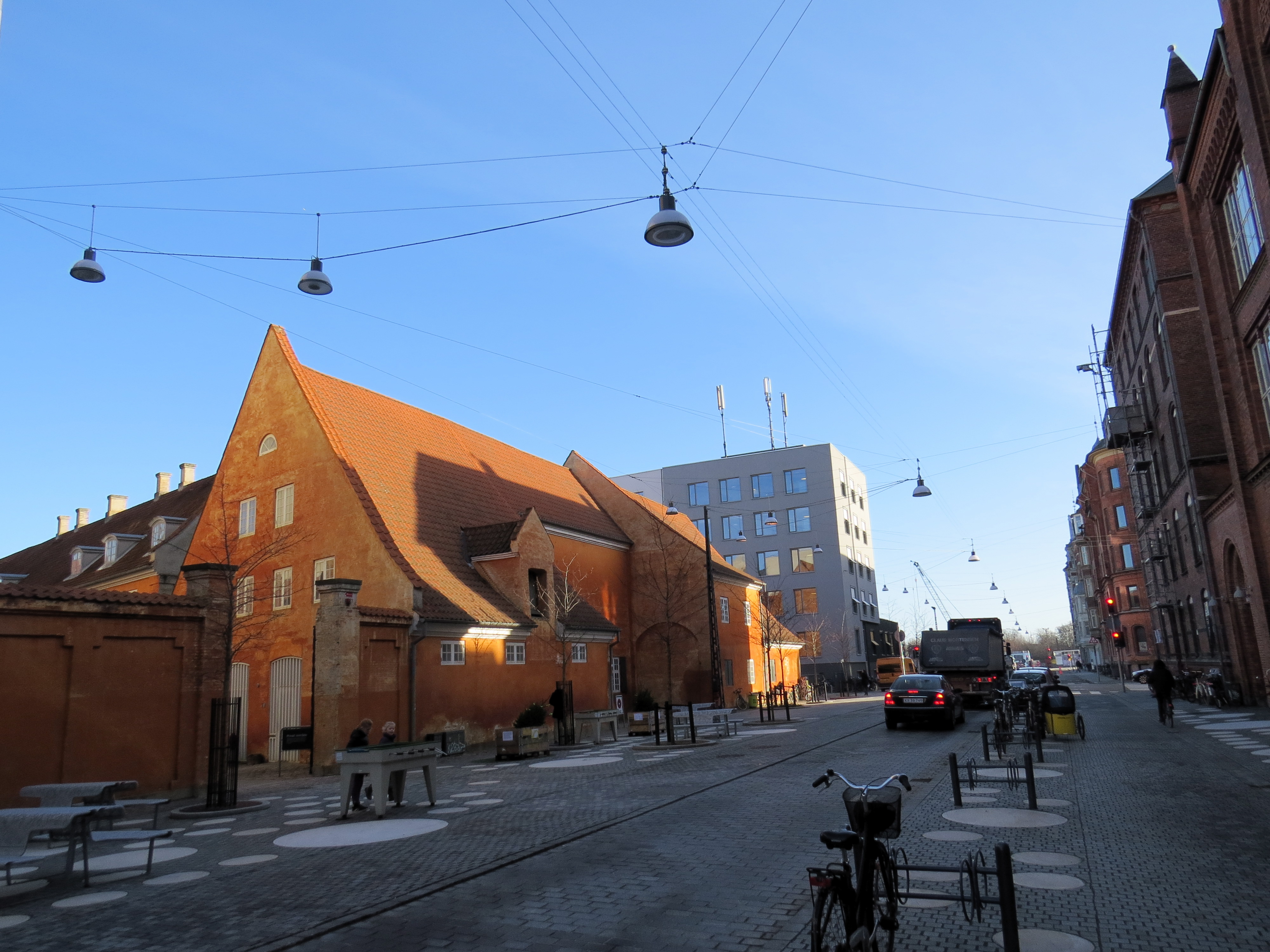
The Hay Storage

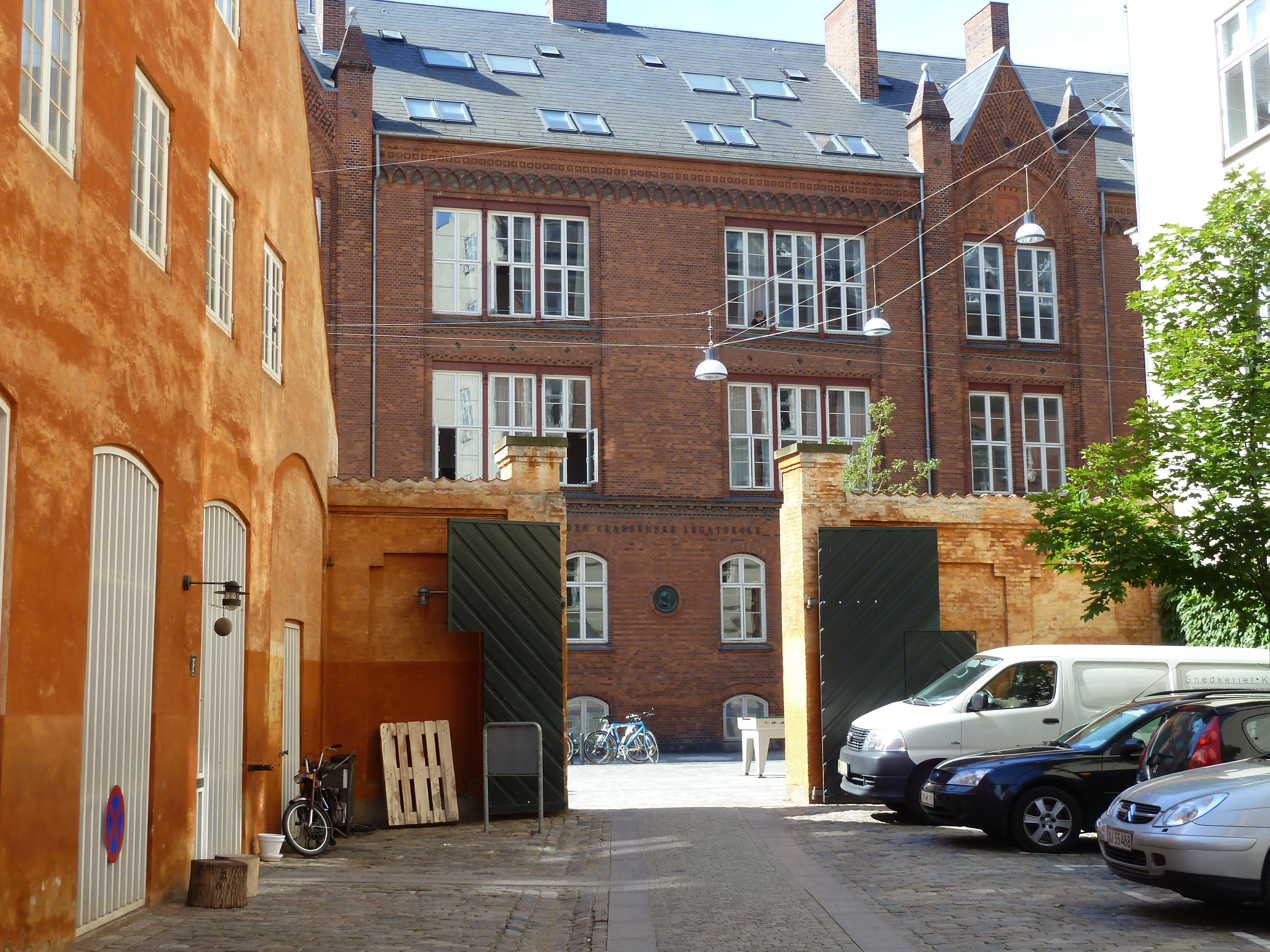
The Classen School

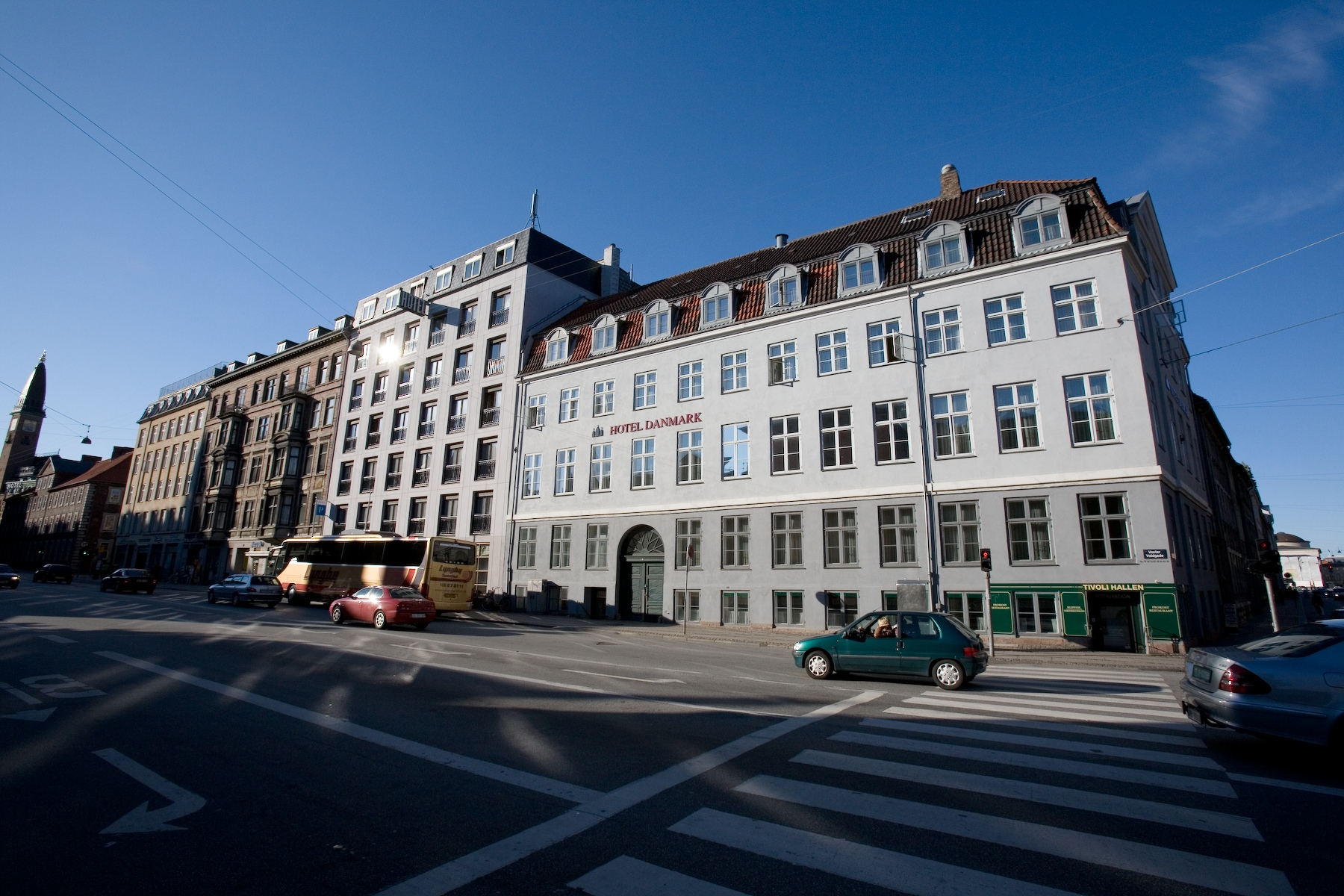
Hotel København

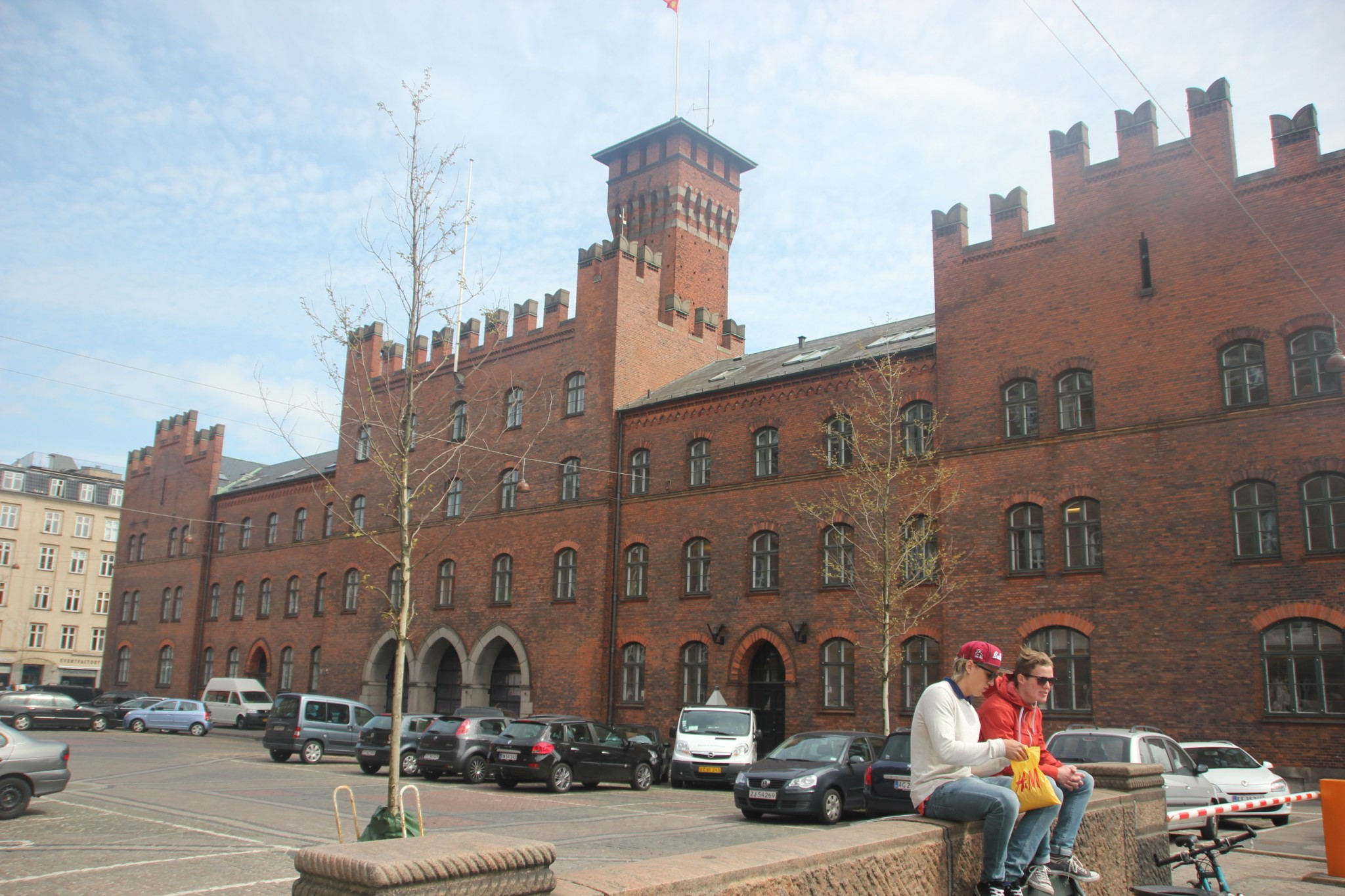
Copenhagen Central Fire Station

== Regnbuepladsen ==
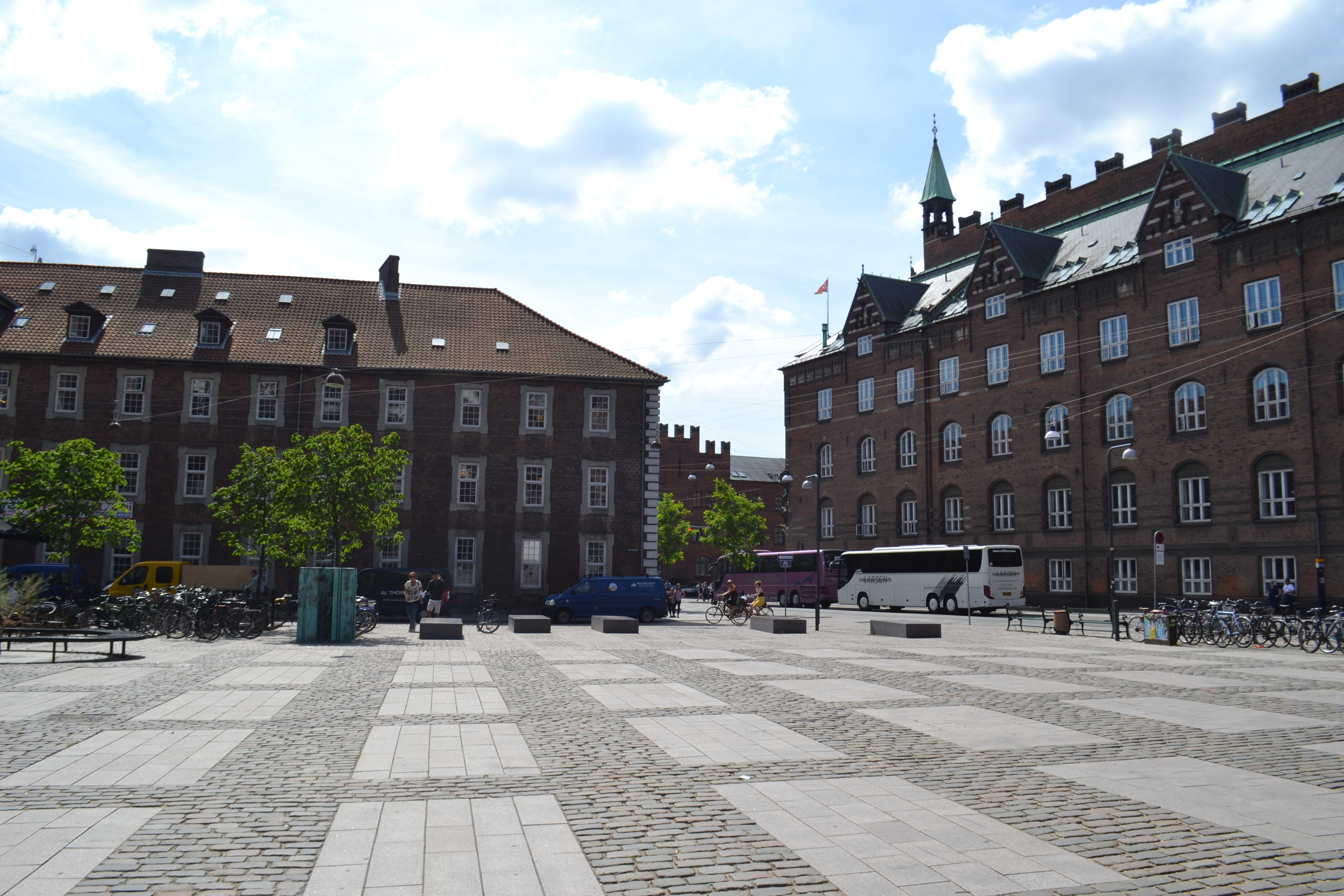
Regnbuepladsen

The small space in front of Vartorv and Palace Hotel, adjoining the City Hall Square, was renovated to a design by Hall McKnight in 2013. The refurbished square received a Civic Trust Award and a RIBA EU Award in 2014. On 1 July 2014, the space was renamed Regnbuepladsen (English: Rainbow Square) in reference to the rainbow flag.

== Transport ==
The main staircase of the Rådhuspladsen Copenhagen Metro station faces the square.
