= Nytorv 19 =

Building in Copenhagen, Denmark

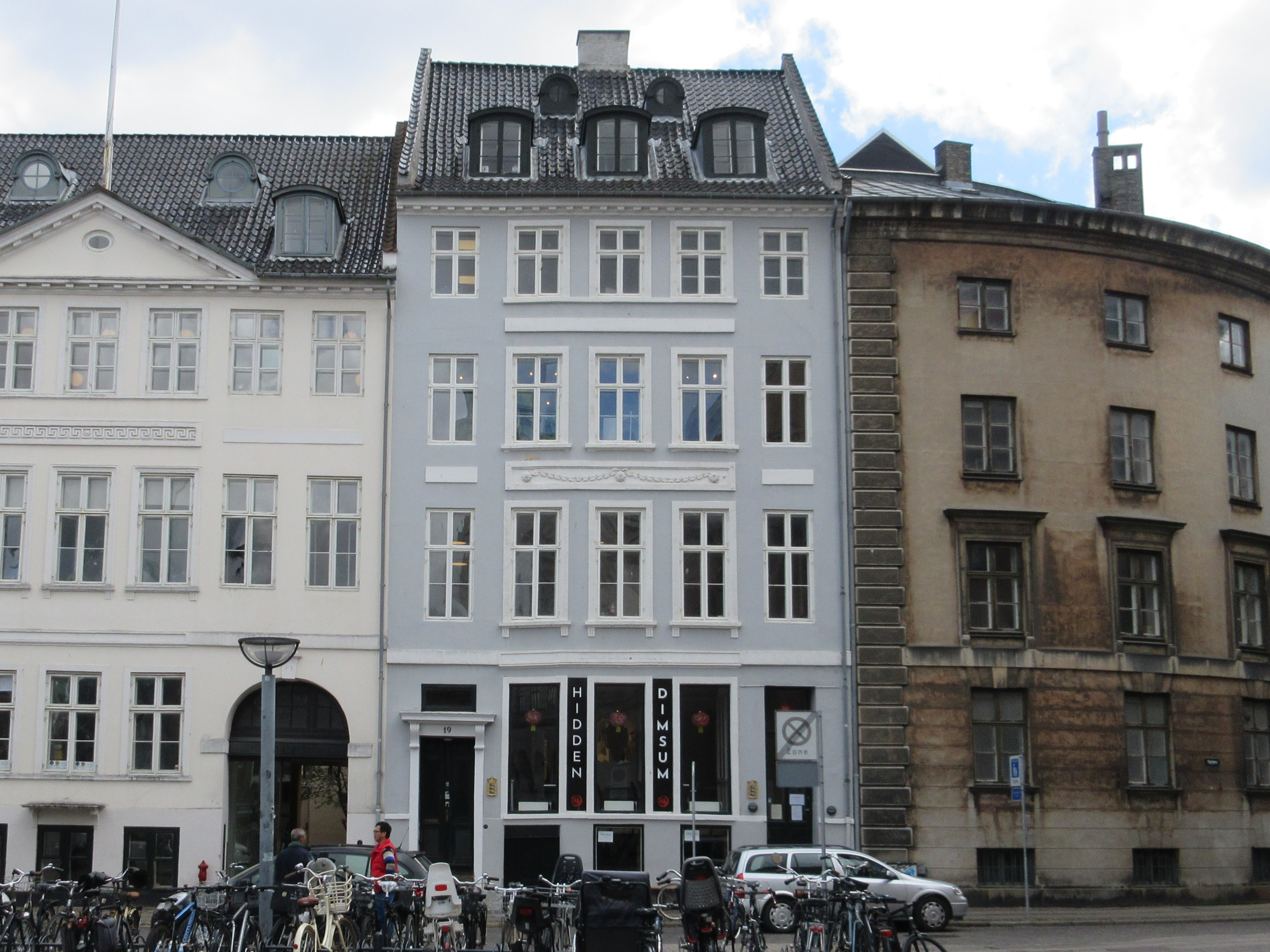
- Interactive map of the Nytorv 19 area

General information
- Architectural style: Neoclassical
- Location: Copenhagen, Denmark
- Coordinates: 55°40′37.45″N 12°34′24.24″E
- Completed: 1797

Nytorv 19 is a Neoclassical building situated on the south side of Nytorv, between the Krak House (No. 18) and the Nytorv extension of Copenhagen Jailhouse (No. 21), in the Old Town of Copenhagen, Denmark. The building was constructed in 1797 as part of the rebuilding of the city following the Copenhagen Fire of 1795. It was listed in the Danish registry of protected buildings and places in 1945. The building was from 1877 owned by bookseller and publisher Otto B. Wroblewski. A bookshop carrying his name occupied the ground floor of the building until 2005. Other notable former residents include the diplomat Frederik Adler Pløyen, actor Ferdinand Lindgreen, naval officer Lorentz Fjelderup Lassen and flower painter Johan Laurentz Jensen.

== History ==
=== 18th century ===
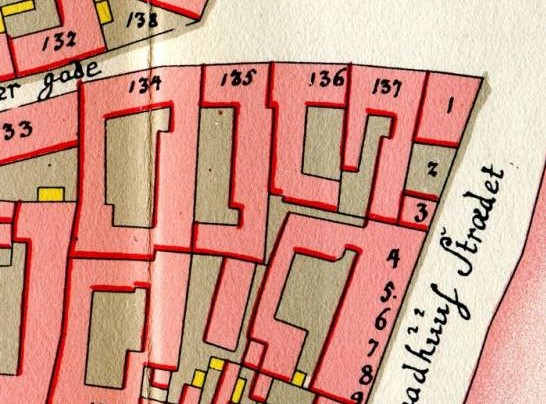
No. 1376 seen in a detail from Christian Gedde's map of Copenhagen's West Quarter, 1757

The property was listed in Copenhagen's first cadastre of 1689 as No. 112 in the city's West Quarter. It was owned by one Christian Viborg's widow at that time. It was listed in the new cadastre of 1756 as No. 136 and belonged to merchant Martinus Schultz at that time.

The property was home to 69 residents in 10 households at the time of the 1787 census. Henrick Christoffer Mocke, a beer seller, resided in the building with his wife Maria Cherstin. Per Jensen, a blacksmith at Nyholm Naval Dockyards, resided in the building with his wife Anne Magrette and their three sons (aged five to 17). The two eldest sons worked as carpenters at Nyholm. Søren Pedersen, another blacksmith at Nyholm Dockyards, resided in the building with his wife Karen Niels Datter, their two children (aged nine and 14) and one lodger. Charl Henrick Betzel, a soldier in the Norwegian Life Regiment, resided in the building with his wife Anne Maria Arnsen, their four children (aged one to seven), a lodger and the lodger's seven-year-old son. Johan Maansen, a boatman in royal service, resided in the building with his wife Anne Marie Lars Datter and their four children (aged seven to 14). Johanne Maria, a widow street vendor, resided in the building with three of her children (aged 11 to 25). Christian Frederick Løvenberg, a smith, resided in the building with his wife Johanne and their three children (aged two to seven). Johan Christian Rom, another smith, resided in the building with his wife Ellen Maria Anckkersen and their two children (aged four and six). Chrestofer Stom, a junior officer in the Zealand Regiment, resided in the building with his wife Inger and their two sons (aged one and nine). Christop Sterm, a corporal in the Zealand Regiment, resided in the building with his wife Inge, their two children (aged in and eight) and no less than 20 royal guards from the same regiment (listed as lodgers).

=== Hans Jessen and the new building ===
The property was destroyed in the Copenhagen Fire of 1795, together with most of the other buildings in the area. The present building on the site was constructed from merchant Hans Jessen in 1797.

Kessen is registered as a "manufacturer of starch" at the 1801 census. His property was home to a total of 25 residents in six households at that time. Jessen resided in the building with his wife Mette (née Pilegaard), their son Jes Andres Jessenm (student), his wife's relative Andreas Pilgaard, student Carl Adolph Dahl and one maid. Frederik Adler Pløyen, a secretary in the Department of Foreign Affairs, resided in another apartment with his wife Johanne Bachman, their two-year-old daughter Elise Henriette Pløyem, his sister-in-law Elise Henriette Pløyem, Johanne Bachman and one maid. Balthazar Pausen Schiøtt, another secretary, resided in the building with his wife Margrethe Nissen, their two children (aged 15 and 17) and two maids. Jens Jensen, a beer seller (øltapper), resided in the basement with his wife Maren Tvede, their three children (aged four to 14) and one maid.

The property was listed in the new cadastre of 1806 as No. 116. It was still owned by merchant Hans Jessen at that time.

The actor Ferdinand Lindgreen (1770-1842) resided in one of the apartments from 1816 to 1817. Counter admiral Lorentz Fjelderup Lassen (1756-1837) resided in one of the apartments from 1819 to 180. The flower painter Johan Laurentz Jensen resided in one of the apartments from 1826 to 1832.

=== 1840 census ===
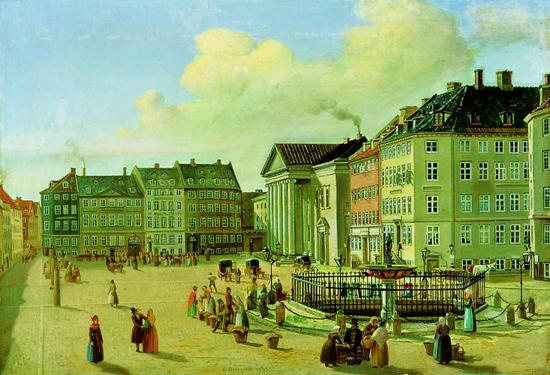
The building seen in a painting from 1839

The property was home to just 13 residents in four households at the time of the 1840 census, partly because no residents were recorded on the second floor (possibly due to the apartment being temporarily empty, other use or simply missing census records). Vulff Salomon, a Jewish merchant, resided on the first floor with his wife Sara Oppenheim, their 22-year-old daughter Therese Salomon, his son Julius Fredrich Sloman (a travelling salesman) and one maid. Christopher Fich, an auctioner's assistant, resided on the third floor with his wife Bolette Sunkenberg and one maid. Johan Ludvig Bauer, a floor clerk (handelsbetjent), resided on the ground floor with his wife Petrine Høst and one maid. Adam Petersen, a grocer (høker), resided in the basement with his wife Dorthe Nielsen and one maid.

=== 1850 census ===
The property was home to 18 residents in five households at the 1850 census. Sally Slomann, a clerk (handelsfuldmægtig), resided on the first floor with his wife Rosalia (née Heilbuth), their one-year-old daughter Elisabeth Marie Therese Slomann and two maids. Edle Sophia Cederfeldt de Simonsen (née Møllerm 1797–1869), widow of commander-captain Andreas Christian Cederfeldt de Simonsen (1779-1839), resided on the second floor with two unmarried daughters (aged 22 and 27) and one maid. Julius Diderich S--Nau, a porcelain merchant, resided alone on the third floor. Johan Ludvig Bauer, a clerk (handelsbetjent), resided on the ground floor with his wife Cetrine Petronela Bauer and one maid. Niels Mortensen, a grocer (høker) lived with Berthe Marie Mortensen (née Freriksen), their two children and one maid.

=== Otto B. Wroblewski ===
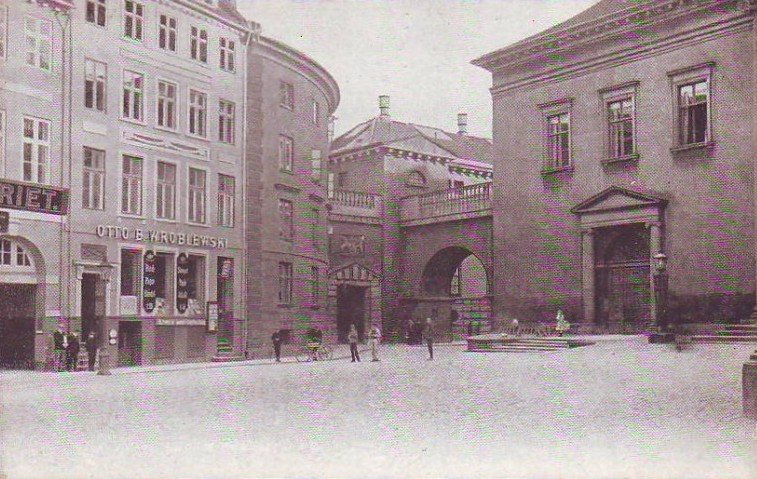
Otto B. Wroblewski's at Nytorv 10

The publisher and former bookseller Otto B. Wroblewski purchased the building in 1877. He had started his career as a bookseller in Rskilde in 1855. In 1848, he opened a combined bookshop, stationery and publisher at Købmagergade 18. On 1 January 1862, he closed the bookshop to focus on his activities as a publisher as well as the sale of stamped paper. On 1 April 1863, he moved the firm to new premises at Nytorv 11. In 1872, he moved again, now to Nytorv 27, on the other side of the square (corner of Strøget). Wroblewski opened an elegant shop in his new building at Nytorv 19. From 14 October 1882, he also operated a bookshop in the building.

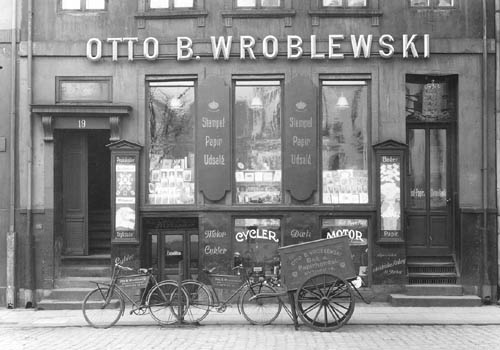
Otto B. Wroblewski

Wroblewski's son, Otto Wroblewski Jr. (1860-1921), was made a partner in 1886. He became the sole owner of the firm upon his father's death in 1907. His own son, Paul Wroblewski (1892-1979), was made a partner in 1919. Paul Wroblewski became the sole owner of the company upon his father's death in 1921. His son, Ivan Otto Wroblewski (1928-), was made a partner in 1074.

On 1 January 1995, Ivan Otto Wroblewski sold the firm (and property) to Forlaget Thomson, a subsidiary of The Thomson Corporation. The new owner adapted the building for use as office space. On 31 October 1996, Ivan Wroblewski was replaced by Peter Brandt as daily leader of the bookshop. The bookshop closed on 30 June 2001.

== Architecture ==
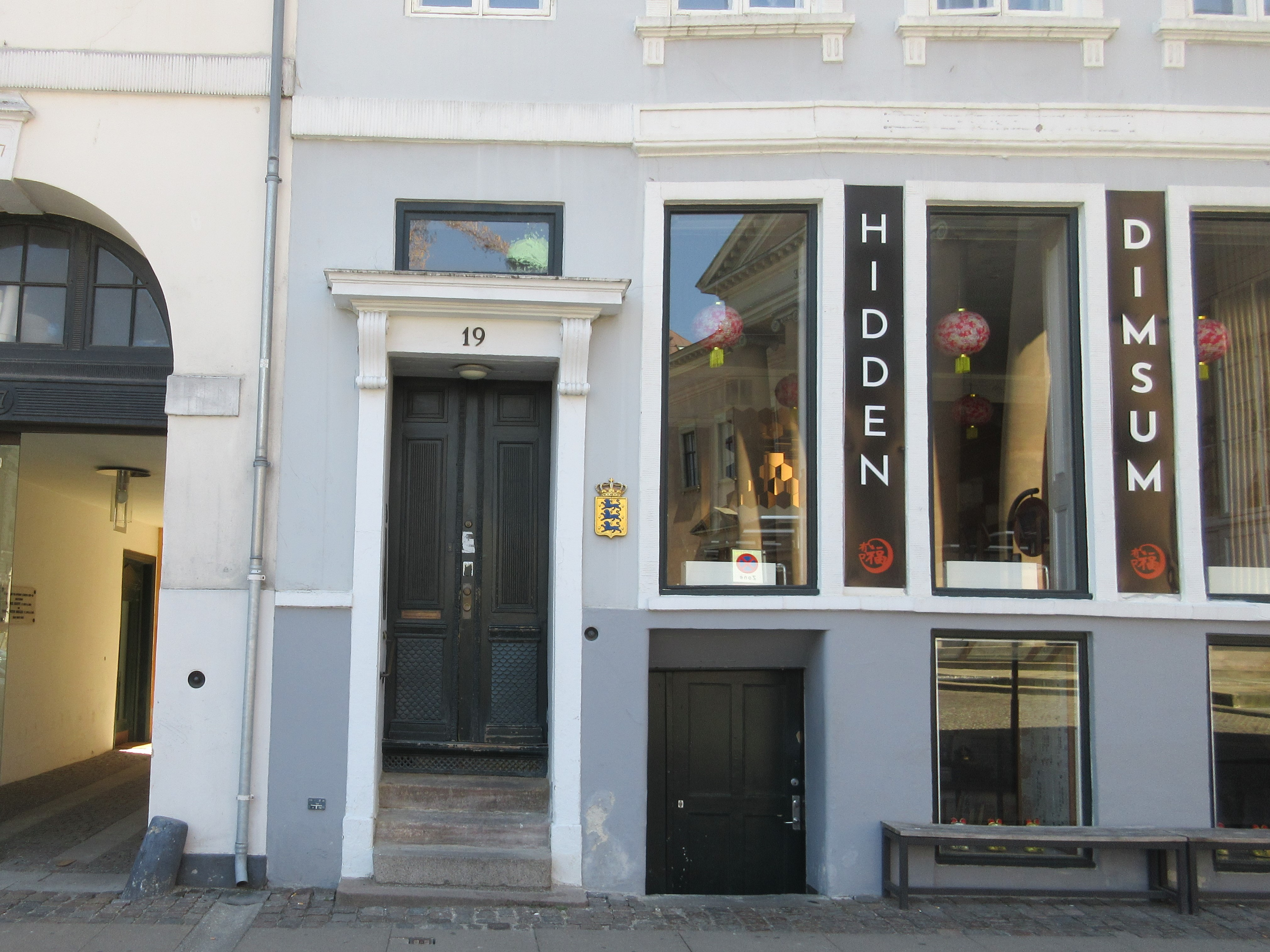
Detail of the facade

Nytorv 19 is constructed in brick with four storeys over a walk-out basement. The five-bays-wide facade is plastered and painted in a bluish-grey colour. It is finished with a white-painted band above the exposed part of the basement, a white-painted cornice band above the ground floor and a modillion cornice below the roof. A frieze with festoon ornamentation is seen above the three central windows of the first floor. It is flanked by two short blank friezes above the lateral windows. A frieze is also seen above the three central windows of the second floor but it is without festoon ornamentation and not flanked by friezes above the lateral windows. The three central windows of the first and second floor are also accented with white-painted framing, marginally more so on the first floor where the sills are supported by corbels. The main entrance is located in the bay furthest to the left (east). The door is topped by a hood mould supported by corbels. The entrance to the ground floor is located in the bay furthest to the right (west). A basement entrance is located in the second bay from the left. The pitched black-glazed tile roof features three dormer windows towards the square. The roof ridge is pierced by a central chimney. A three-bays-long side wing extends from the rear side of the building along the boundary to No. 21 (Copenhagen Jailhouse). A secondary staircase appendix projects from the side wing. It is integrated with the front wing via a canted corner bay. The yard side of the building complex is plastered and painted yellow.

== Today ==
The building is now owned by Frederik Brøndum. A restaurant occupies the ground floor and basement of the building. The three upper floors are used as office space.
