= Krak House =

Building in Copenhagen, Denmark

- Kraks Hus
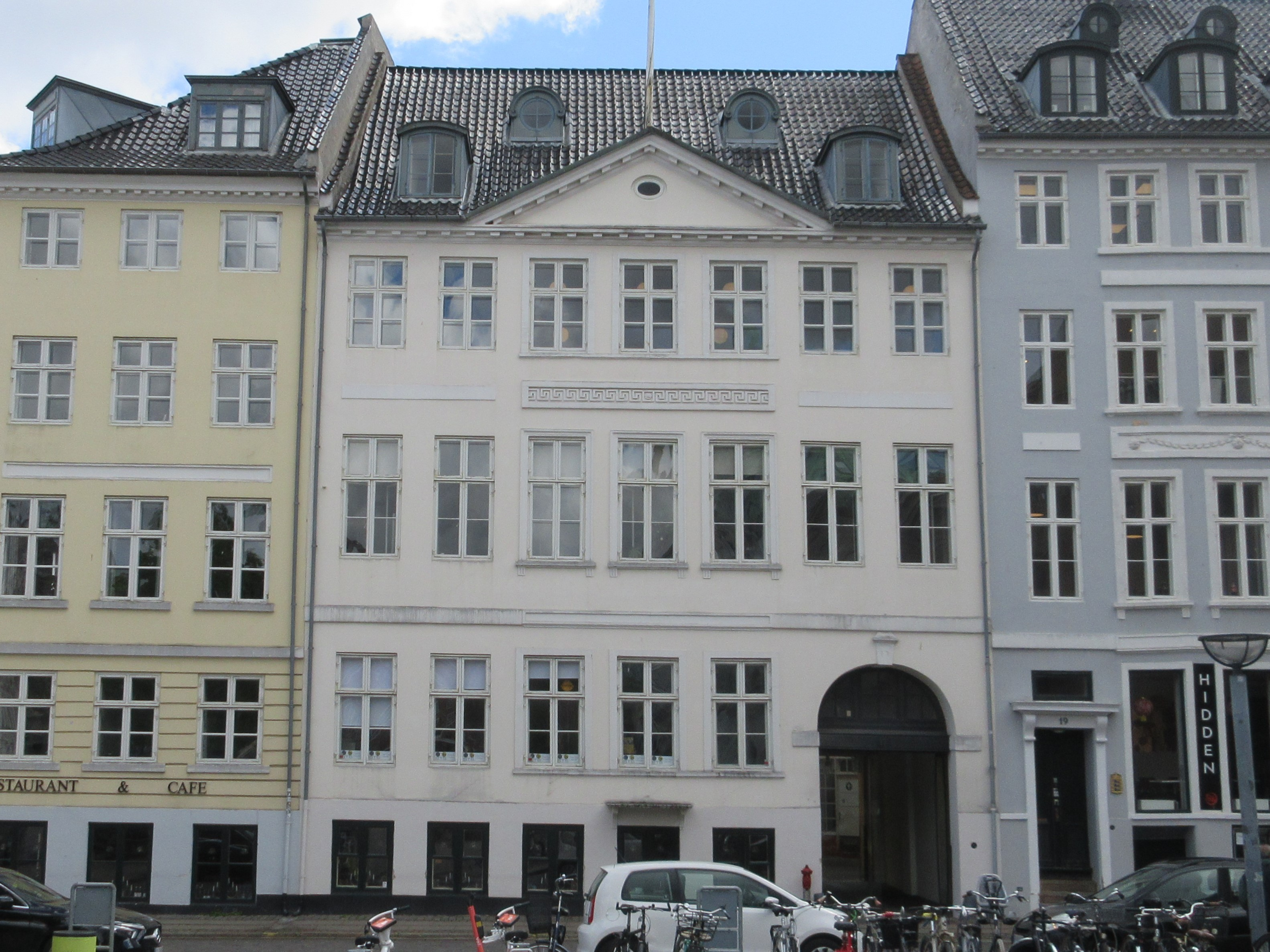
- Interactive map of the Krak House area

General information
- Architectural style: Neoclassical
- Location: Copenhagen, Denmark
- Coordinates: 55°40′37.7″N 12°34′24.73″E
- Current tenants: Danish Centre for Culture and Development.
- Completed: 1796
- Owner: Nordea

The Krak House (Danish: Kraks Hus) is a Neoclassical property overlooking the square Nytorv (No. 17) in the Old Town of in Copenhagen, Denmark. It takes its name from the publishing house Kraks Forlag which was based there for many years. The Danish Centre for Culture and Development, a self-governing institution under the Danish Ministry of Foreign Affairs, is based in the building.

== History ==
=== Origins ===
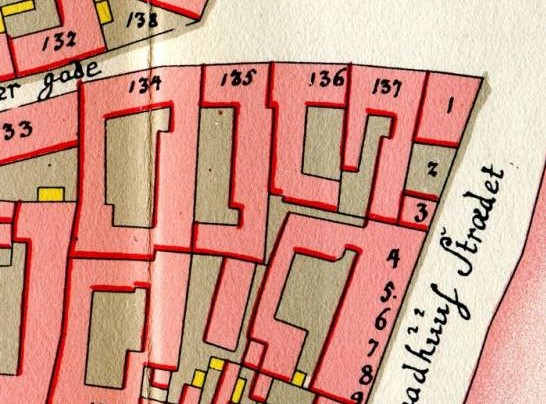
No. 137 seen on a detail from Christian Gedde's map of Copenhagen's West Quarter, 1757.

The property was listed as No. 113 in the city's West Quarter owned (Vester Kvarter) in the Cadastre of 1689. It was at that time owned by procurator Christoffer Munk. In 1the new cadastre of 756, it was listed as No. 137 and belonged to a justitsråd named Fischer.

At the time of the 1787 census, No. 137 was home to two households. Catrine Orups. a 63-year-old widow and the owner of the property, resided in the building with a maid and a poor 11-year-old girl. Christian Gotlob Proft (1736- 1793), a bookdealer, resided in the building with his wife Christine Rothe, their six children (aged five to 23), the wife's sister Christine Lovise Rothe, a clerk, a lodger and two maids.

=== The new building ===
The property was destroyed in the Copenhagen Fire of 1795, together with most of the other buildings in the area. The current building on the site was built for merchant Hans Jessen in 1795-1796. It was in the new cadastre of 1806 listed as Western Quarter, No. 117 and had by then been acquired by Hans Christian Møller.

At the time of the 1801 census, No. 137 was home to four households. Nobleman Arnoldus von Falkenskiold of Sæbygård (1743-1819), a military officer with rank of colonel, resided on one of the apartments with his wife Elisabeth von Sehested-Falkenskiold, their four children (aged six to 19), a housekeeper (husjomfru), two maids, a coachman and a male servant. Christian Proft, a bookdealer (son of C. G. Proft), resided in another apartment with his wife Jacobine Høvinghof, their two children (aged three and five), the clerk Adolph Nitsche and the student Friderich Proft. Georg Friderich Leopold von Bøtticher, a captain in the Norwegian Regiment, resided in a third apartment with one maid and one lodger (soldier). Knud Larsen, a beer seller (øltapper), resided in the basement with his wife Karen Hillebrandt, their three children (aged three to 13) and one maid.

The property was listed as No. 113 in the new cadastre of 1806. It was at that time owned by Hans Christian Møller.

=== 1729s and 1830s ===
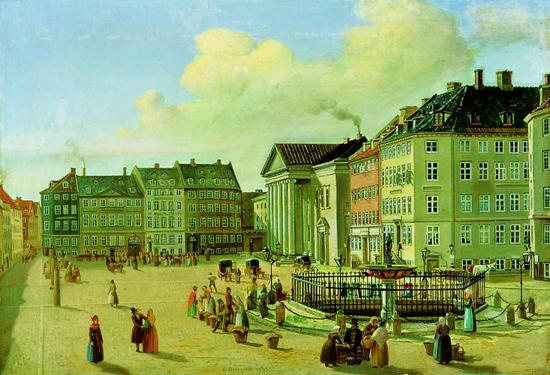
The Krak House seen on a painting from 1839

The historian E. C. Werlauff lived in the building from 1823 to 1825. He was employed at the Royal Danish Library from 1798 and worked there for the next 65 years, replacing D. G. Moldenhawer as Chief Librarian in 1823. The writer and poet Henrik Hertz lived in the building from 1836 to 1837. Poul Martin Møller, writer and professor of philosophy at the University of Copenhagen, was a resident in the building from 1837 until his death just over one year later.

=== 1749 census ===
At the time of the 1840 census, No. 137 was home to 40 people in 13 households. Ole Peter Nielsen, a distiller, resided on the ground floor with his wife Caroline Marie Petersen and a six-year-old foster son. Jens Hansen Grønberg, a master joiner, resided on the first floor with his wife Marie Elisabeth Olsen and their four children (aged two to 15). Anne Marie Møller, a 25-year-old woman employed with neddlework, was also resident on the first floor. Niels Johan Salquist, a workman, resided on the second floor with his Maria Elisabeth Salquist and their three children (aged two to 11). Sophia Munck, a 68-year-old widow, was together with one lodger (needleworker) also resident on the second floor. Anne Cathrine Lassen, a 67-year-old laundry woman, resided in the garret with one lodger. Søren Philipsen, a watchman, was also residing in the garret with his wife Conradine Philipsen and their two children (aged two and four). The tenants of the side wing included a trompeteer and a workman on the ground floor, a cotton weaver and a seamstress on the first floor, a laundry woman on the second floor and a workman on the third floor.

=== 1850 census ===
The property was home to 26 26 residents in five households at the 1850 census. Poul Sörensen Refs, an innkeeper, resided one the ground floor with a waiter, a caretaker, two lodgers, a housekeeper and a maid. Philip Bendixen, a merchant (grosserer), resided on the first floor with his wife Henriette Bendixen født Solden, three daughters (aged 14 to 20), one maid and one lodger. Dorthea Christine Hoff, widow of a justitsråd, resided on the second floor with two unmarried daughters (aged 28 ad 34), one maid and two lodgers. Carl Frederik Svendsen, a former mailman, resided alone in the garret. Peder Hansen m a grocer (høker), resided in the basement with his wife Caroline (née Larsen), their two children (aged seven and 11) and one maid.

=== 20th century ===
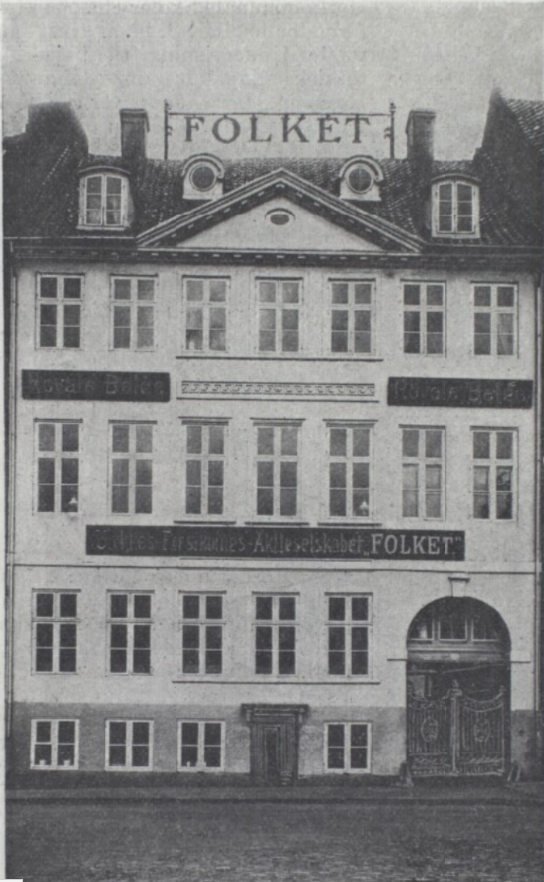
Assuranceselskabet Folket's building, 1900

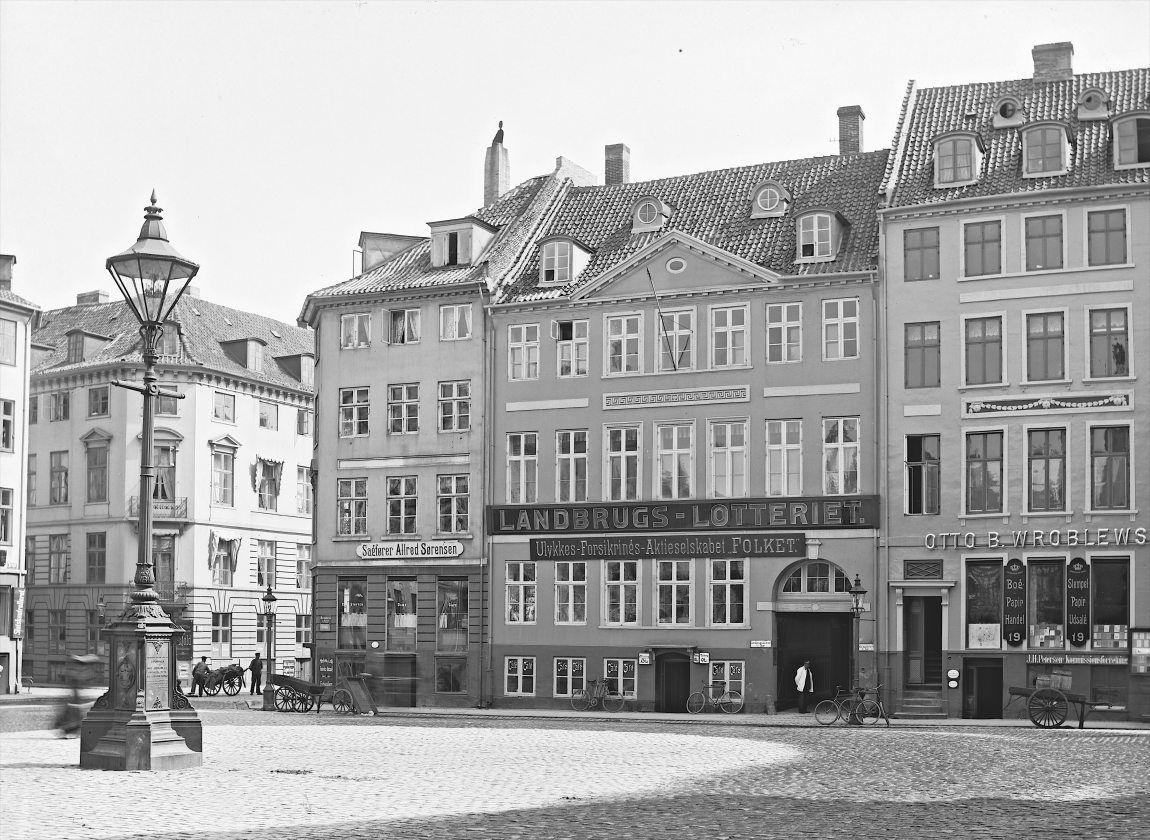
The building on 14 August 1908

The insurance company Assuranceselskabet Folket was based in the building at the turn of the century. The building was listed on the Danish Registry of Protected buildings and Places in 1918. It was purchased by the publishing house Kraks Forlag in 1920 and used as its new head office. The company restored the building in 1986-1988 with the assistance of the architect Søren Cock-Clausen. In 1998. Kraks Forlag moved to a new headquarters in Virum north of Copenhagen. The associated foundation, Kraks Fond, moved to Ved Stranden 16 and is now based in Fæstningens Materialgård.

== Architecture ==
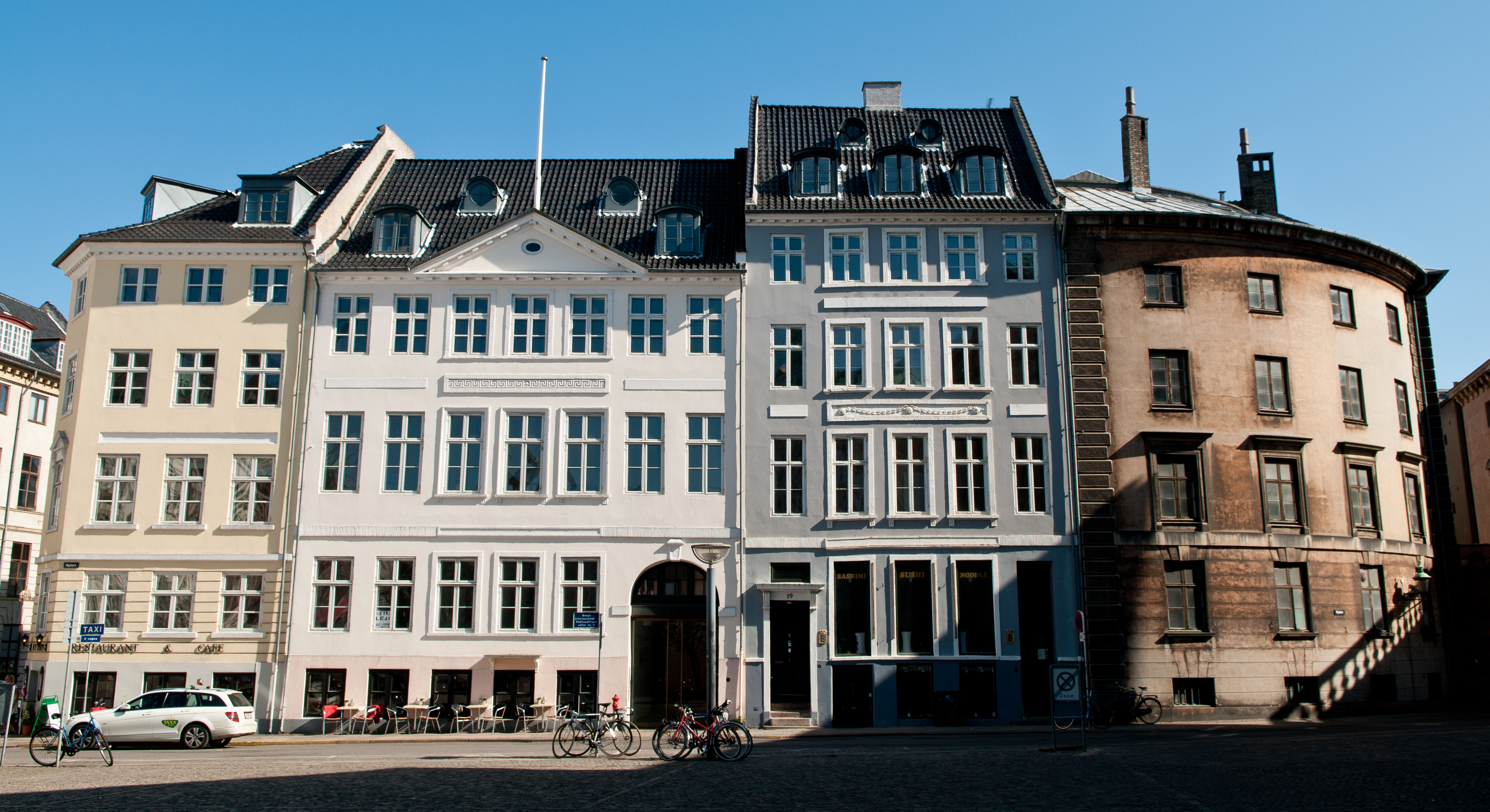
Nytorv 15-19

The house consists of three storeys and a cellar. The seven-bay facade is tipped by a triangular pediment over the three central bays.

== Today ==
The Danish Centre for Culture and Development, a self-governing institution under the Danish Ministry of Foreign Affairs, is based in the building. Other tenants include Fable Media and hydralab.

== See also ==
- Listed buildings in Copenhagen Municipality
