= Great book theft =

Library theft case in Copenhagen, Denmark

The great book theft (Danish: Det store bogtyveri) was the largest book theft in Danish history. Almost 3,200 works (books and the like), estimated in 2003 to have a value of DKK150-300 million (US$24–48 million), were stolen from the Royal Library in Copenhagen. The perpetrator was an employee at the library who stole the works between 1970 (possibly even starting in 1967) and 1978, but the case was only resolved in 2003. Most works have since been recovered, but several hundred remain missing. It has been called the most significant cultural theft in Denmark since the Golden Horns of Gallehus were stolen in 1802.

== The theft ==
The works (books and similar) were primarily stolen from the library's antique collections, published in the 16th to 18th century, almost entirely foreign (only a few were Danish) and chosen based on their perceived economic value, often targeting illustrated works and other types of works that are popular among international book collectors. Many of the stolen books were relatively small and thin, making it easier to smuggle them out of the library. All works published before the year 1500 and the most important works published after 1530 were housed separately in the library under higher security and nothing was stolen from those collections. The smaller number of more recently published works (not antiques) that were stolen are generally of low economic value and can typically be replaced.

Suspicion of theft –or at least recognition that some works were missing– began in the early 1970s, but it was only in 1975 that systematic theft was confirmed. Further security measures were introduced and in 1978 this was extended to checking the pockets and bags of employees, at which point the thefts stopped. The police became involved in the mid-1970s and a detailed investigation was performed. Wanted notices for missing works were forwarded to Interpol and international antique book traders. Although there were several theories regarding potential perpetrator(s), none were based on more than speculations, but it was recognized that it likely was an inside job. There was very little solid evidence and few leads; the police investigation had completely stalled by the mid-1980s.

== Resolution ==
The case was solved in September 2003 when a person wanted to sell a large number of antique books, including one that was particularly rare, at the Christie's auction house in London and they contacted the Danish Royal Library. The thief, a director (at the time of the theft) of the Royal Library's oriental department named Frede Møller-Kristensen, had died in January 2003. The people attempting to sell the large number of books at the Christie's auction house were his widow and daughter-in-law. Whereas he appears to have been slow and meticulous when selling the stolen works (either when doing it himself or instructing his family to do it) and none are confirmed to have been sold in the first couple of decades after they were stolen, following his death his family became more careless. At a coordinated raid of the family's homes in Germany and Denmark in November 2003, some 1,800 books were recovered, including 1,500 in the home of Frede Møller-Kristensen and his wife (then widow). Subsequently, further works were recovered. In 2005, a comprehensive inventory found that 622 antique works (books and similar) were still missing from the Royal Library's collection, of which slightly more than 2/3 potentially were stolen by Frede Møller-Kristensen (the remaining were lost in other ways earlier, for example during war evacuations). From 1997 to 2002, the thief and his family are known to have sold 77 books for about DKK10 million (US$1.7 million) at various international auctions, and it is estimated that up to 250 of the stolen books may have been sold.

During his employment at the library, Frede Møller-Kristensen was regarded as a well-educated and very knowledgeable librarian and researcher, although he gradually developed an alcohol problem, which became a serious hindrance to his work in the 1980s. Colleagues saw him as friendly, quiet and almost appearing anonymous; during his employment nobody had considered him as the potential perpetrator. Because he was the director of the department where many works were stolen, he had been able to partially suppress information about the disappearances in the initial phase in the 1970s.

=== Convictions ===
Because Frede Møller-Kristensen had died before the case was solved, nobody was charged for the theft itself, but four family members and a friend were charged with possession and selling of stolen goods. His widow insisted on her innocence, but her detailed diary became a primary piece of evidence in the case. In 2004, Eva Møller-Kristensen, the 69-year-old widow, was sentenced in Copenhagen's City Court to three years in prison and a DKK623,613 (US$106,000) fine, Thomas Møller-Kristensen, his 42-year-old son, got two years; Silke Albrecht, his 33-year-old daughter-in-law, and a family friend, each received 18 months; the friend was acquitted on appeal. In 2005, a 40-year-old daughter was also found guilty, receiving a ten-month suspended prison sentence and DKK146,000 (US$25,000) that she had received from her parents were seized. A DKK17.9 million (US$3 million) civil suit, equalling the estimated amount that would be needed to recuperate the still missing works that are known to have been sold, was filed against the widow in 2005, but it was considered unlikely that she could pay because of her limited economic means and poor health.
