= Jens Lauritzen House =

Building in Copenhagen, Denmark

- Jens Lauritzens Gård
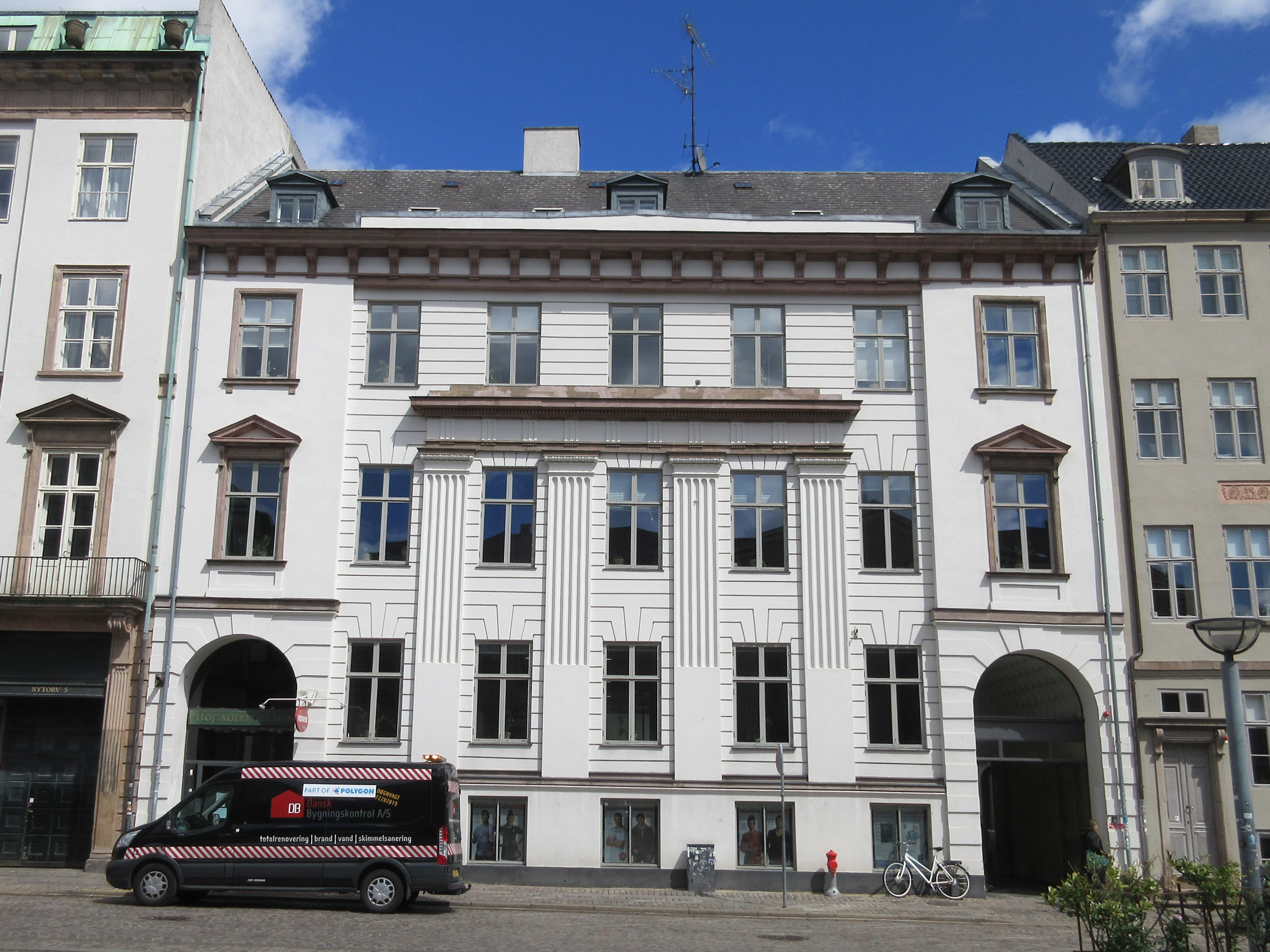
- Interactive map of the Jens Lauritzen House area

General information
- Architectural style: Neoclassical
- Location: Copenhagen, Denmark
- Coordinates: 55°40′39.52″N 12°34′24.56″E
- Construction started: 1796
- Completed: 1796
- Owner: Nordea

Design and construction
- Architect: Andreas Kirkerup (attribution)

The Jens Lauritzen House is a Neoclassical property at Nytorv 7 in the Old Town of Copenhagen, Denmark. Home to the Association of Folk High Schools in Denmark, the building is now also known as Højskolernes Hus (English: The House of Folk High Schools).

== History ==
=== 18th century ===
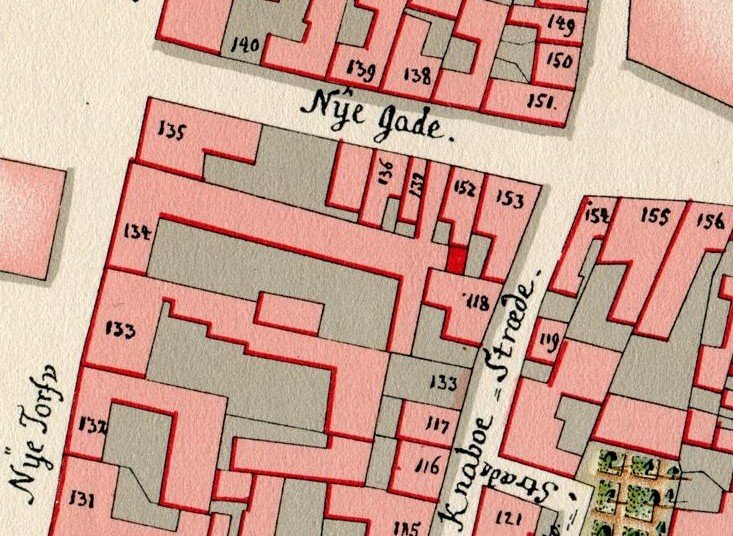
No. 132 seen on a detail from Christian Gedde's map of Snaren's Quarter, 1757.

The site was part of two properties in 1689. One of them was listed as No. 149 in Snaren's Quarter and owned by brewer Hans Mikkelsen. The other one was listed as No. 150, owned by brewer Søren Pedersen. They were later merged into a single property. By 1756, it was listed as No. 132, owned by brewer Oluf Beck.

=== Lauritzen and the new building ===
The property was later acquired by brewer and merchant Jens Lauritzen. His property was home to 11 residents in two households at the 1787 census. Lauritzen resided in the building with two clerks (betjent), one brewer's apprentice (bryggerknægt), a caretaker (gårdskarl), a coachman, a housekeeper, and a maid. Christen Jensen Ebstrup, a junk dealer, resided in another apartment with his wife Mette Maria and their three-year-old granddaughter Anna Margrethe.

Together with most of the other buildings in the area, Lauritzen's property was destroyed in the Copenhagen Fire of 1795. A new building was constructed for him in 1795–1796. It is believed that the building was designed by Andreas Kirkerup.

Lauritzen's property was home to four households at the 1801 census. Jens Lauritzen resided in one of the apartments with his second wife Anna Marie Hansen, a 17-year-old granddaughter of his first wife's sister, a 28-year-old nephew, one brewer, one brewer's apprentice, a caretaker, a coachman and two maids. Ditlev Friderich Feddersen, a royal bailiff (kgl. foged), resided in the building with his wife Dorthea Catharina Staal and three maids. Christine Knudsdatter Lercke, a beer seller (øltapper), resided in the building with her six children (aged two to 13) and one maid. Peder Foltmer, another beer seller (øltapper), resided in the building with his wife Karen Sørensdatter.

The property was listed in the new cadastre of 1806as No. 87 in Snaren's Quarter. It was owned by Lauritzen's widow at that time.

=== 1840–1900 ===
The property was home to 36 residents in five households at the 1840 census.. Hertz Isaac Loria (1783–1856), a textile merchant, resided on the ground floor with his wife Bella (née Meyer, 1794–1882), their five children (aged 10 to 24), a niece, a servant and two maids. Isaac Levysohn, a merchant (grosserer), resided on the first floor with his wife Hanna Levysohn (née Nathansen), two male employees and two maids. His wife Hannah Nathanson (1822–1885 later married Messina-based businessman and consul Axel Fog. Abel Christine Fiedler (1760–1846), widow of Caspar Friederich Fiedler (1744–1811), a glass merchant and director of Kjøbenhavns Brandforsikring (Copenhagen Fire Insurance), resided on the second floor with a daughter and two grandsons, two maids, a caretaker and two lodgers. Daughter Christiane Caroline Sommer was the widow of regiment surgeon and royal surveyor Joachim Otto Sommer (1781–1823). R. Petersen, a grocer (høker), resided in the basement with his wife Dorthea M. Petersen (née Worm), their two children (aged 11 and 13), two male employees and one maid. Jens Sørensen Thostrup, another grocer (høker), also resided in the basement with his wife Christine Catrine Thostrup née Luund, and their 20-year-old daughter Caroline Dorothea Thostrup.

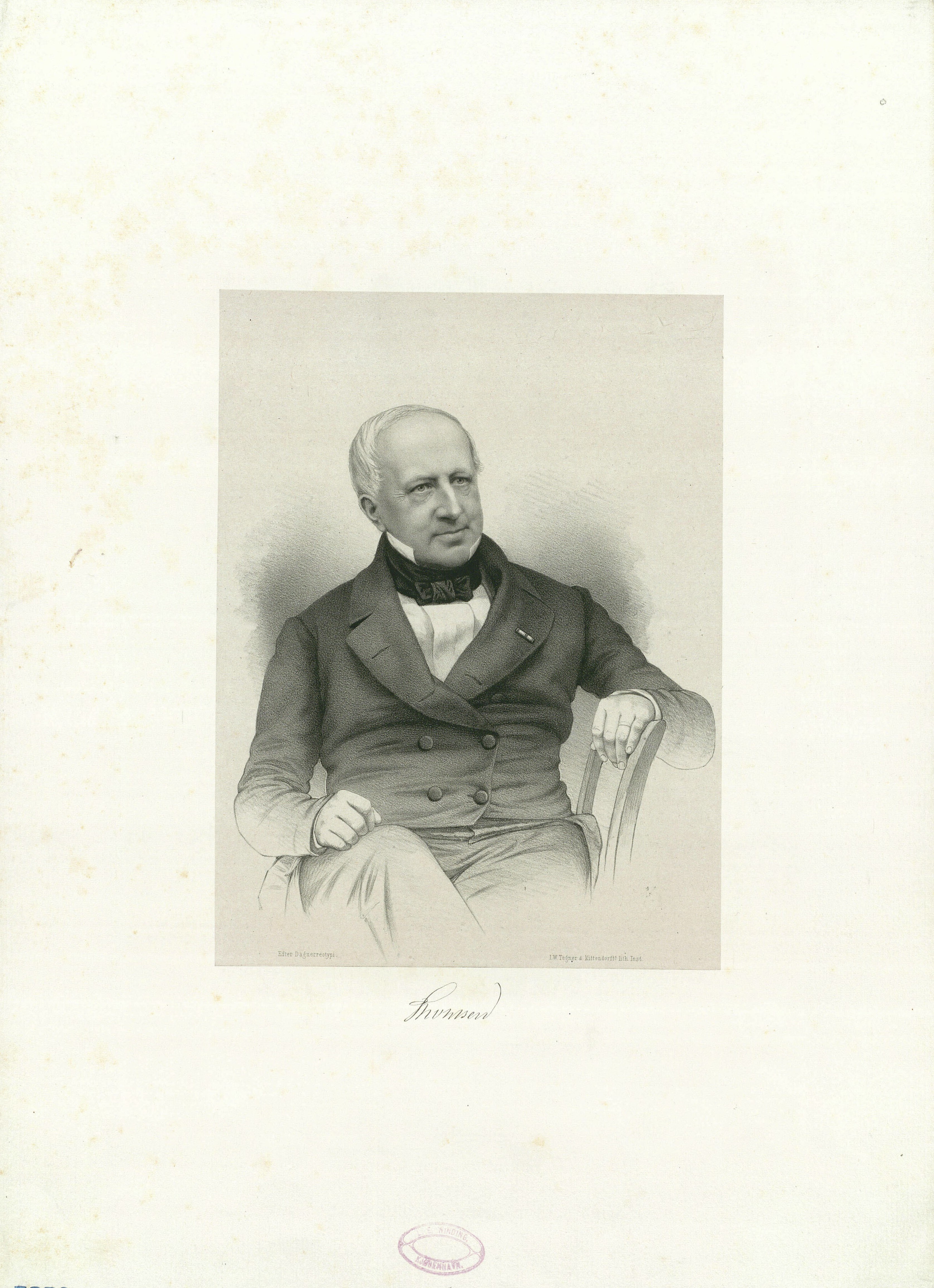
Andreas Peter Thomsen

The property was home to 35 residents in five households at the 1850 census. H. Levysohn, who had become a widow, was still residing on the first floor with her sisters Bella Nathansen and 26 years old Beate Bollag, the latter's five-year-old son Anton Bollag, one male servant and two maids. Louis Christian Voss, a professor of medicine and royal physician, resided on the ground floor with his wife Thora Voss, their seven children (aged one to 19), one lodger (goldsmith's apprentice) and three maids. Andreas Peter Thomsen, chief justice of Hof- og Stadsretten, resided on the second floor with his sons Ludvig Jacob Manus Ulrich Thomsen and Christian Albert Frederik Thomsen, his sister Caroline Cathrine Thomsen, his foster sister Cathrine Ulrike Byberg, his sister-in-law Christine Marie Gude and two maids. Niels Hansen, a grocer (høler), resided in one half of the basement with his wife Martaa Maria Rossenkeld and one maid. Ole Larsen, another grocer (høker), resided in the other half of the basement with his wife Marie Larsen, their 13-year-old daughter and one maid.

The younger of Thomsen's two sons was the later civil servant and politician Christian Albert Frederich Thomsen (1827–1894). He married on 14 November 1856 Voss' daughter Thora Michelle Voss.

With the introduction of house numbering by street in 1859, as a supplement to the old cadastral numbers by quarter, Snaren's Quarter No. 87 was listed as Nytorv 7. The building was home to a total of 26 residents in five households at the time of the 1860 census. Johan Georg Ferdinand Kiotz, a merchant (grosserer), resided on the ground floor with his wife Marie Stephandine (née Hansen), their two children (aged 22 and 25) and one maid. Sophie Emilie Baroness Knuth (née Brüel, 1798–1866), widow of Carl Conrad Gustav, Baron Knuth-Conradsborg of Rudbjerggaard, resided on the first floor with her sister Louise Amalie Brüel, the visitor Emilie Caroline Hellemann, one male servant, a coachman, a female cook and a maid. Andreas Peter Thomsen (1781-1860), former chief justice of Hof- og Stadsretten, resided on the second floor with his daughter Marie Ulrikke Louise Caroline Thomsen, his hoster sister Cathrine Ulrikka Byberg, his late wife's sister Kirstine Marie Gude, her 20-year-old Albert Valentin Gude (1749-1818, student and later civil engineer, and two maids. Christian Petersen, a grocer (høker), resided in one half of the basement with his wife Hanne Marie (née Schmiddt) and their three children (aged four to 12). N. Andersen, another grocer (høler), resided in the other half of the basement with his wife Doroyhea Andersen.

General Cai Hegermann-Lindencrone (1807–1893) lived in the building from 1862 to 1864. National bank director Moritz Levy (1824–1892) lived in the building from 1868.

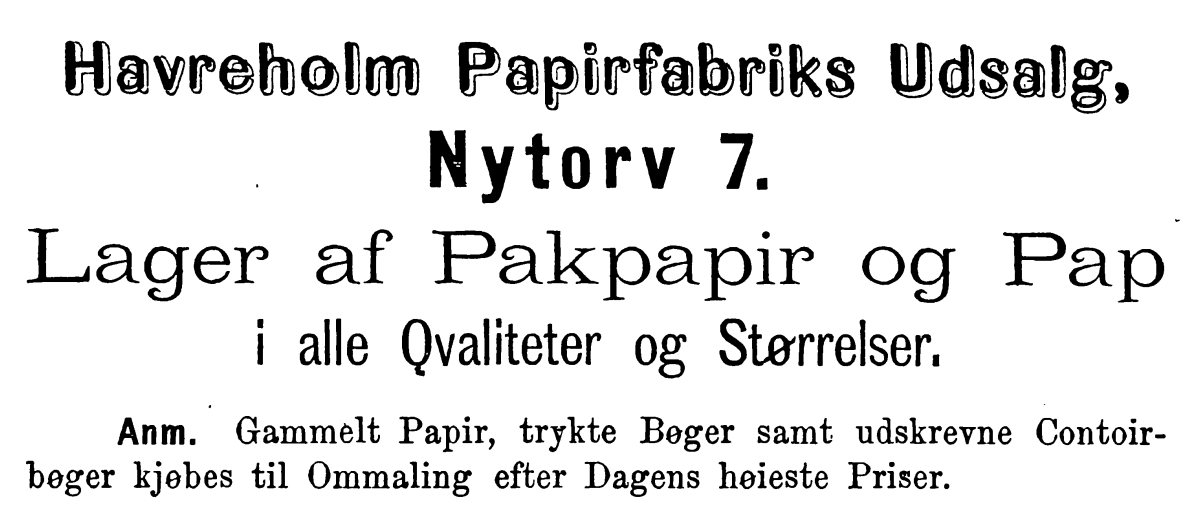
Advert for Havreholm Paper Factory, 1872.

The property was home to 34 residents at the 1880 census. Emilie Frederikke Christensen, a widow who managed baker Olsen's bread outlet, resided on the ground floor with the floor clerk Maria Christine Weber. Christian Fibiger Knudsen a bank assistant resided alone on the first floor. Lauritz Christian Lindhardt, a dentist, resided on the second floor with his wife Mary Jane Lindhardt (née From=, their four children (aged two to eigh5t), a male servant, a female cook and two maids. Lauritz Ejler Theodor Schiøler (1835-1908), a businessman (varermægler), resided on the third floor with his wife Augusta Thalia Petrea Schiøler (née Lehn=, 1836-1901), their seven children (aged two to 18), one male servant and one maid. Rasmus Jensen . a Årivatbanken courier, resided in the garret with his wife Caroline Christine Jensen (née Petersen=, their four children (aged zero to eight), his sister Marie Jensen (teacher) and one maid. Søren Peter Petersen, a servant for clothing retailor Lund,, was also resident in the garret.

=== 20th century ===
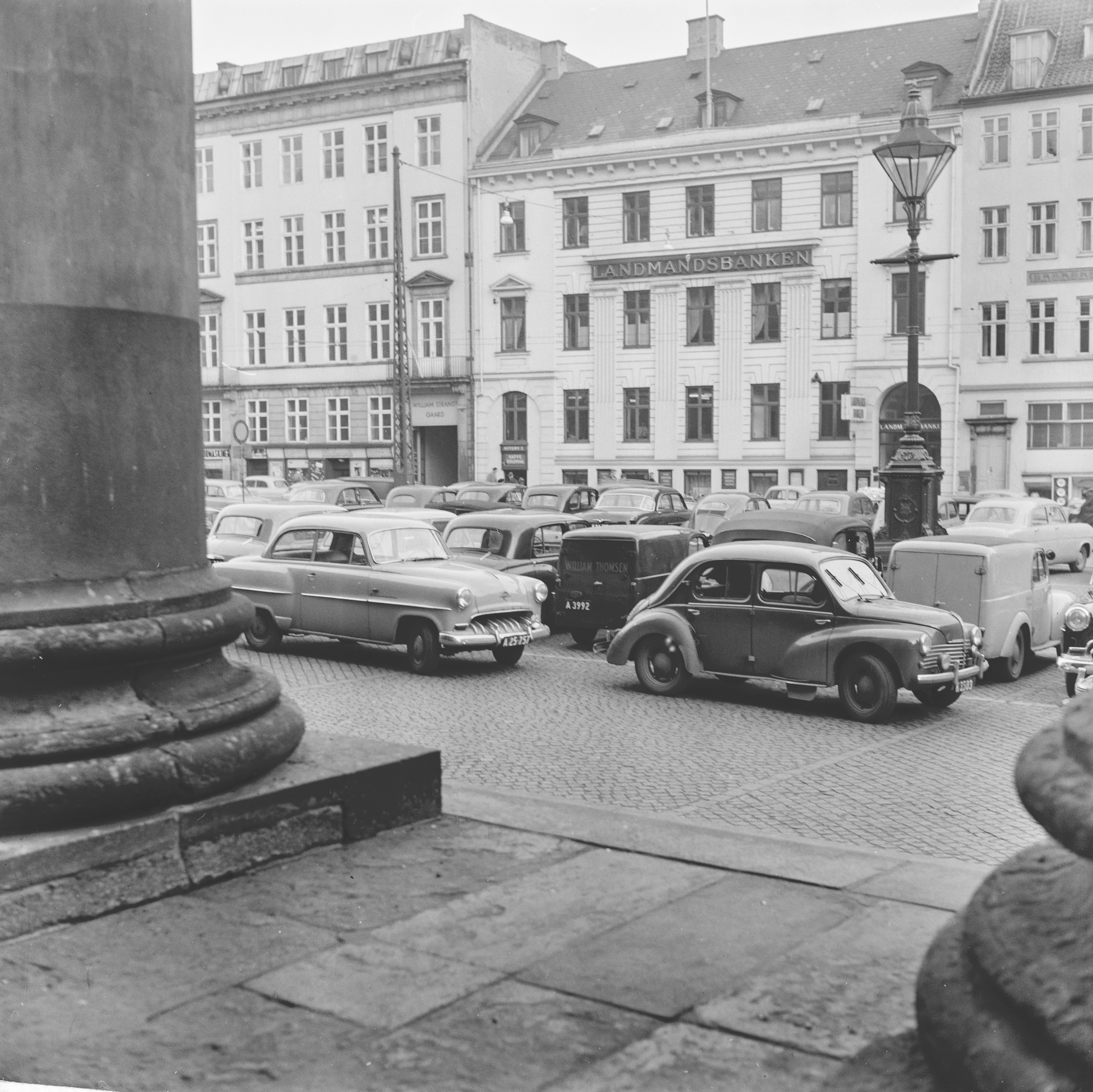
The building in 1954.

The property was home to 15 residents at the 1906 census. Sophie Græbe, a widow, resided on the ground floor with her son Walter Aoerhoff, one maid and her late husband's relative Elsa Aoerhoff. Anton Stelling, owner of the Stelling paint company, resided on the first floor with his wife Emma Stelling and two maids. Oscar Wanscher. chief surgeon at Frederick's Hospital, resided on the second floor with his wife Johanne Margrethe Wanscher, their two children (aged 16 and 24) and three maids.

A branch of Landmandsbanken was based in the building in the 1950s.

== Architecture ==
The building is constructed with three storeys over a walk-out basement and is seven bays wide. The five central bays are slightly recessed. Four ionic order pilasters flank the three central bays. A side wing extends from the rear side of the building. In the courtyard is a five-storey warehouse.

== Today ==
The building is owned by Nordea. The tenants include the Association of Folk High Schools in Denmark. The warehouse in the courtyard houses a travel agency.

In 2020, Holsøe Arkitketer was responsible for converting the rear wing from office space into residential apartments.

== See also ==
- Listed buildings in Copenhagen Municipality
