= George Pepler =

British town planner

Sir George Lionel Pepler (24 February 1882 – 13 April 1959) was a British town planner who was influential in the development of town planning practice in the first half of the twentieth century.

== Life and career ==
George Pepler was born 24 February 1882 in Croydon, Surrey, and was educated at Bootham School, York, and The Leys School, Cambridge.

He trained as a surveyor, but became interested in development and town planning issues, and established a practice with Ernest G. Allen. From 1908, they were among the first to specialise in laying out new villages and housing estates for landowners. Pepler became a member of the Garden Cities Association (later the Town and Country Planning Association), and of the National Housing and Town Planning Council. In 1914 he was a founding member of the Town Planning Institute (TPI). Also in 1914, as a member of the Local Government Board, he was placed in charge of the Greater London Arterial Road Conferences. In 1919, he was appointed Chief Town Planning Inspector to the Ministry of Health, a post which he held until 1941. He was then Chief Technical Adviser to the Ministry of Town and Country Planning from 1943 to 1946. In these posts he was responsible for persuading local authorities of the importance of town planning for communities, and then, after the end of the Second World War, for their overall responsibility for guiding the process of post-war housing and physical reconstruction.

Pepler was largely responsible for preparing the Town and Country Planning Act 1947, which gave a leading role to town planning within central and local government, and enshrined the concept of the green belt. He later took on planning consultancy roles in Renfrewshire, and between 1950 and 1954 for the Government of Singapore. He was a member of the Royal Commission on common land in 1955–58.

He became President of the TPI in 1919–20, and uniquely served for a second term in 1949–50, as well as acting as the organisation's Secretary and Treasurer at different times. He also received the organisation's Gold Medal. He chaired both the Town Planning Joint Examination Board and the Town and Country Planning Summer School for many years. He was President of the International Federation for Housing and Town Planning in 1935–38, and again between 1947 and 1952 before becoming its Honorary President for life. He was also active in the National Playing Fields Association, and in the Council for the Preservation of Rural England.

He was knighted in 1948. He died in Dorset at the age of 77.

== Legacy ==
The George Pepler International Award was established by the Royal Town Planning Institute in 1973, and is awarded to a person aged under 30 undertaking research in some aspect of town planning.

== See also ==
- Garden Village, Swansea
