= International Federation for Housing and Planning =

World-wide network regarding housing

- Founded: 1913 London, England
- Founder: Ebenezer Howard
- Type: Non-governmental organization
- Purpose: Urbanism, housing, spatial planning
- Region served: Worldwide
- Key people: Flemming Borreskov
- Website: www.ifhp.org

The International Federation for Housing and Planning (IFHP) is a worldwide network of professionals founded in England, representing the broad field of housing and planning. Its membership is drawn from corporate organisations, professional individuals and those with vocational interests in its activities. The organization is headquartered in London.

The Federation organises a wide range of activities and creates opportunities for an international exchange of knowledge and experience in the professional field. Among these activities, the most prominent event is the annual congress devoted to a topical theme.

== History ==
IFHP was founded in London in 1913 by Ebenezer Howard. Howard was the father of the 'garden city', a combined housing and planning concept designed to solve the problems of ever-expanding metropolitan cities and to create better living conditions for the people. Howard had established the Town and Country Planning Association in 1899 to promote these 'garden city' ideals. The establishment of IFHP with its principle of international exchange of knowledge and experience was a significant step forward for the planning profession, as the international arm of the garden city movement, enhancing the promotion of housing and planning and improving the general standard of the profession.

Its evolving areas of interest have been reflected in the changing titles of the organisation:

- 1922 International Garden Cities & Town Planning Federation
- 1924 International Federation for Town & Country Planning and Garden Cities
- 1926 International Federation for Housing and Town Planning
- 1958 International Federation for Housing and Planning

Along with the title changes, the Headquarters has relocated 16 times through five countries: UK, Belgium, Germany, The Netherlands and now Denmark. Its present address is Fæstningens Materialgård, Frederiksholms Kanal 30, st. mf., 1220 Copenhagen K. Denmark.

IFHP promotes and stages international conferences and congresses, often on several occasions in a year. It promotes global communication and cross fertilisation of ideas and solutions amongst members, professional, corporate and governmental interests. Several working groups are sponsored to address specific global issues. As an organisation it remains neutral on party political and religious issues. The United Nations and the European Union have both sought its representation on their environmental groups.

Over its hundred years of existence, the Federation has been led by no less than 21 Presidents, the first being Sir Ebenezer Howard who held the stewardship for 15 years from 1913 until his death in 1928. Others have come from Europe, Asia and North America.

The current Federation President is Flemming Borreskov (Denmark). The Federation marked its centenary with the theme “A Tomorrow for Cities”.

== Notable past presidents ==
- Ebenezer Howard, UK (1913–1928)
- George Pepler, UK (1935–1938, 1947–1952, thereafter President for Life)
- Karl Strölin, D (1938–1945)

== Bibliography ==
- R. Riboldazzi (2009), Un'altra modernità. L'IFHTP e la cultura urbanistica tra le due guerre, 1923–1939, Roma: Gangemi.
- R. Riboldazzi (2010), La costruzione della città moderna. Scritti scelti dagli atti dell'IFHTP, 1923–1938, Milano: Jaca Book
- Graham Allan (2013), A hundred years at the global spearhead. The Centenary of IFHP 1913–2013
- Wagner, Phillip (2016), Facilitating planning communication across borders: The International Federation for Housing and Town Planning in the interwar period, Planning Perspectives 31, 299–311, DOI: https://dx.doi.org/10.1080/02665433.2015.1102643
- Wagner, Phillip (2016), Stadtplanung für die Welt? Internationales Expertenwissen 1900-1960, Göttingen: Vandenhoeck & Ruprecht, http://www.v-r.de/de/stadtplanung_fuer_die_welt/t-0/1038095/
- Wagner, Phillip (2014), New life for American Downtowns? The 1958 international seminar on urban renewal and the travel of planning ideas in the North Atlantic World, Planning Perspectives 29, 189–208, DOI: https://dx.doi.org/10.1080/02665433.2013.869183
