= Nytorv =

Public square in the centre of Copenhagen, Denmark

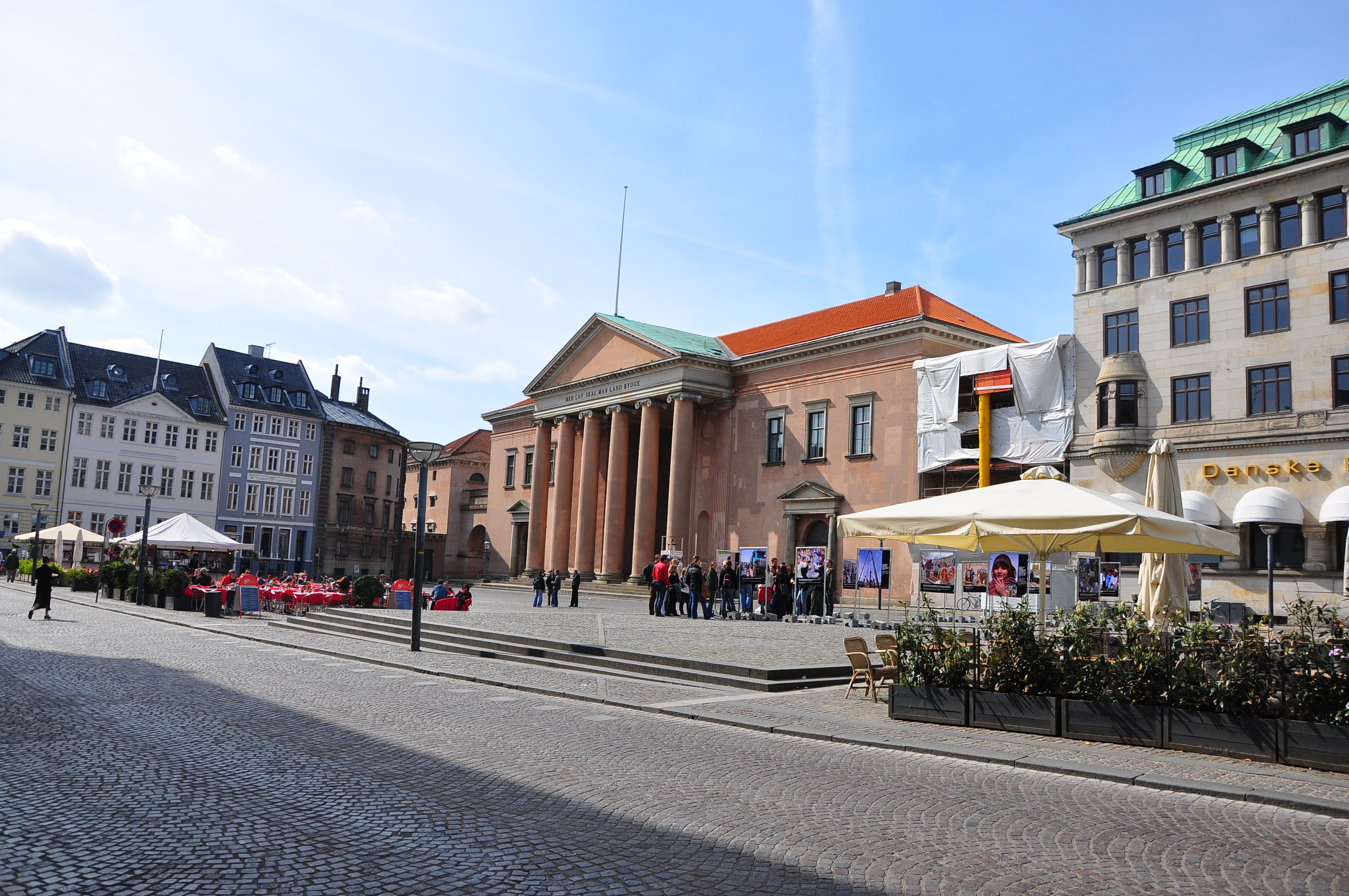
- Nytorv
- Part of: Strøget
- Location: Indre By, Copenhagen, Denmark
- Postal code: 1450
- Coordinates: 55°40′39.36″N 12°34′22.8″E

Nytorv (English: New Square or New Market) is a public square in the centre of Copenhagen, Denmark. Together with the adjoining Gammeltorv it forms a common space, today part of the Strøget pedestrian zone. The square is dominated by the imposing Neoclassical façade of the Copenhagen Court House, which from 1815-1905 also served as the City Hall.

== History ==
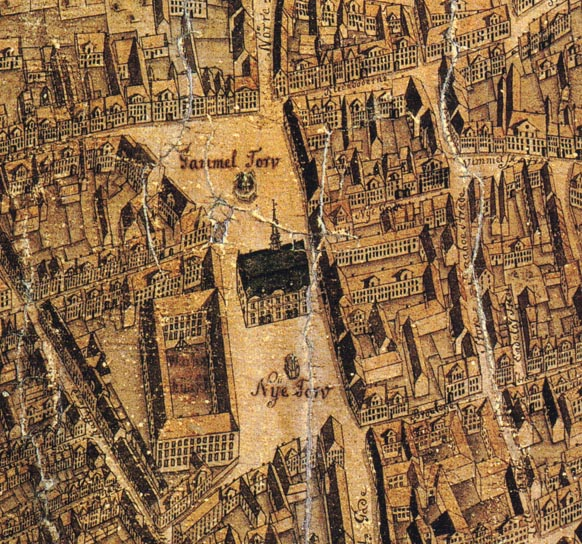
Nytorv and Gammeltorv viewed on Gedde's Map

=== The new market ===
Nytorv was created by Christian IV in 1610 when he cleared an area behind the City Hall in connection with his adaptation of the building in a Renaissance style. Nytorv thrived as a marketplace, as did Gammeltorv, which was located on the other side of the city hall. It was at Nytorv that the butchers carried out their work, while most of the sales took place at Gammeltorv.

=== The city's scaffold ===
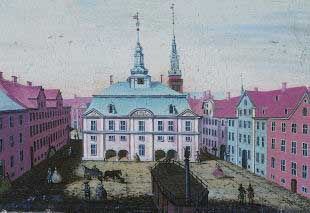
Nytorv with the scaffold painted by Johannes Rach in 1747

Nytorv also became the location of the city's scaffold and a pillory. Pillories were also found at a number of other sites around the city. A permanent scaffold was not constructed until 1627, and in 1728, when the City Hall was rebuilt after the Copenhagen Fire of 1728, an octagonal masonry podium was built.

Between 1728 and 1740, Ludvig Holberg lived in a house on the corner of Gammeltorv and Nygade, on the border between the two squares. In an epigram, originally in Latin, he commented on the dual nature of the site, between posh Gammeltorv, with the Caritas Well (the 'ancient arts'), and Nytorv with its sinister execution facilities:

You ask, in what part of town, I now abide

Two squares quite near, papillae, on the way.
The one Gammel Torv, where ancient arts confide
Fights and theft and fraud and drink and play.
The other Nytorv where a scaffold has been set,
Midway between the two doth Justitia now reign,
So between the doomed and the gallows in duet

I live; my one God, help me 'gainst the twain.

— Ludvig Holberg

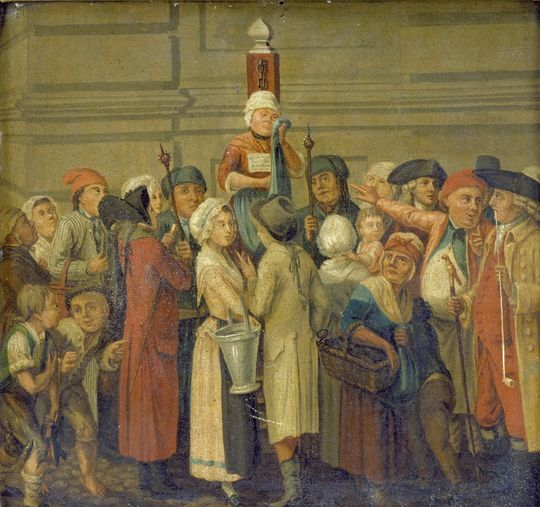
Woman in neck iron at the pillory on Nytorv, c. 1780

The last executions to be carried out at the scaffold behind the City Hall took place in 1758 when Frederik Hammond, the owner of an iron works in Norway, and his assistant, a Swede named Anders Sundblad, were convicted of producing counterfeit securities for an amount of 35,000 rigsdaler and beheaded. Three years later the scaffold was removed and from then executions only took place at Østerfælled, Vesterfælled and Amagerfælled, though branding and whipping continued at the Nytorv pillory until 1780.

=== Merger with Gammeltorv ===
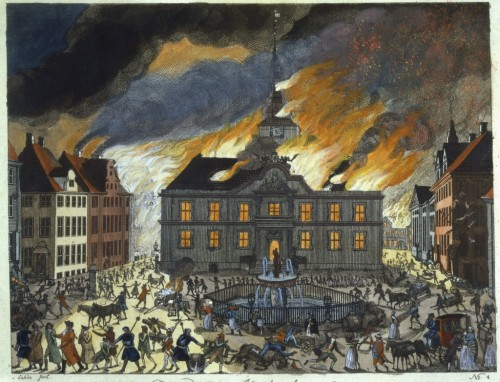
Copenhagen's fourth city hall in flames during the Fire of 1795

In the Copenhagen Fire of 1795 the City Hall burnt down once again. This time it was not rebuilt at the same site, but moved to a larger lot on Nytorv's western side. Since 1728, it had been the location of the Royal Orphanage but this too was lost in the fire and was moved to other locations around the city.

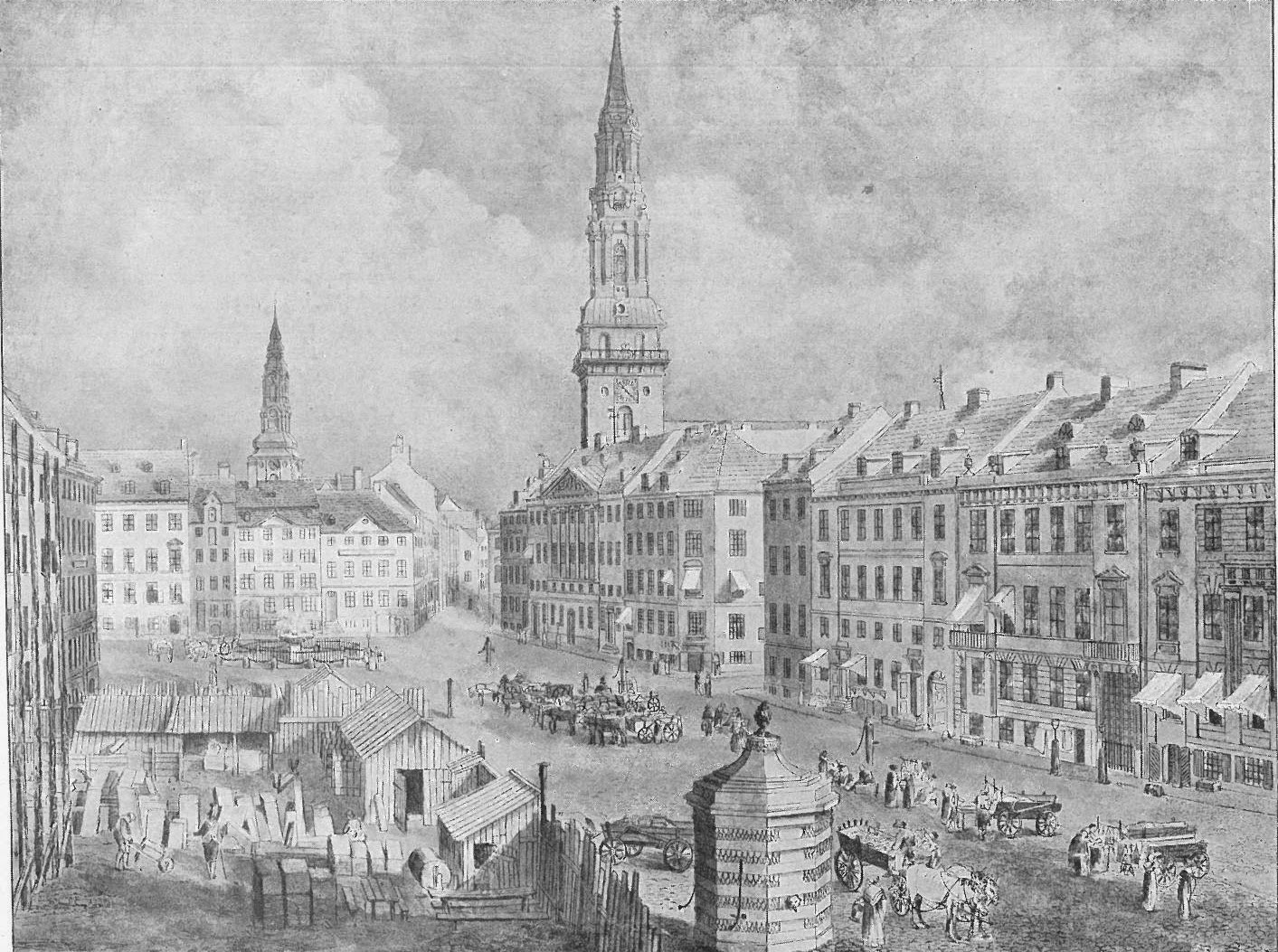
The merged squares in 1805 but before the British bombardment in 1807 destroyed the spire of Church of Our Lady in the background and many of the buildings

The new building, which was to serve both as a City Hall and a courthouse, was designed by Christian Frederik Hansen, the leading Danish architect of the time. Completed in 1815, the project also included a jailhouse next door, connected to the courthouse by an arch with a passageway.

After the fire, Nytorv and Gammeltorv made up one common space. During the first half of the 20th century, the market activities gradually disappeared from the square which instead became increasingly dominated by cars. This changed in 1962 when the Strøget pedestrian zone was laid out.

== Buildings ==
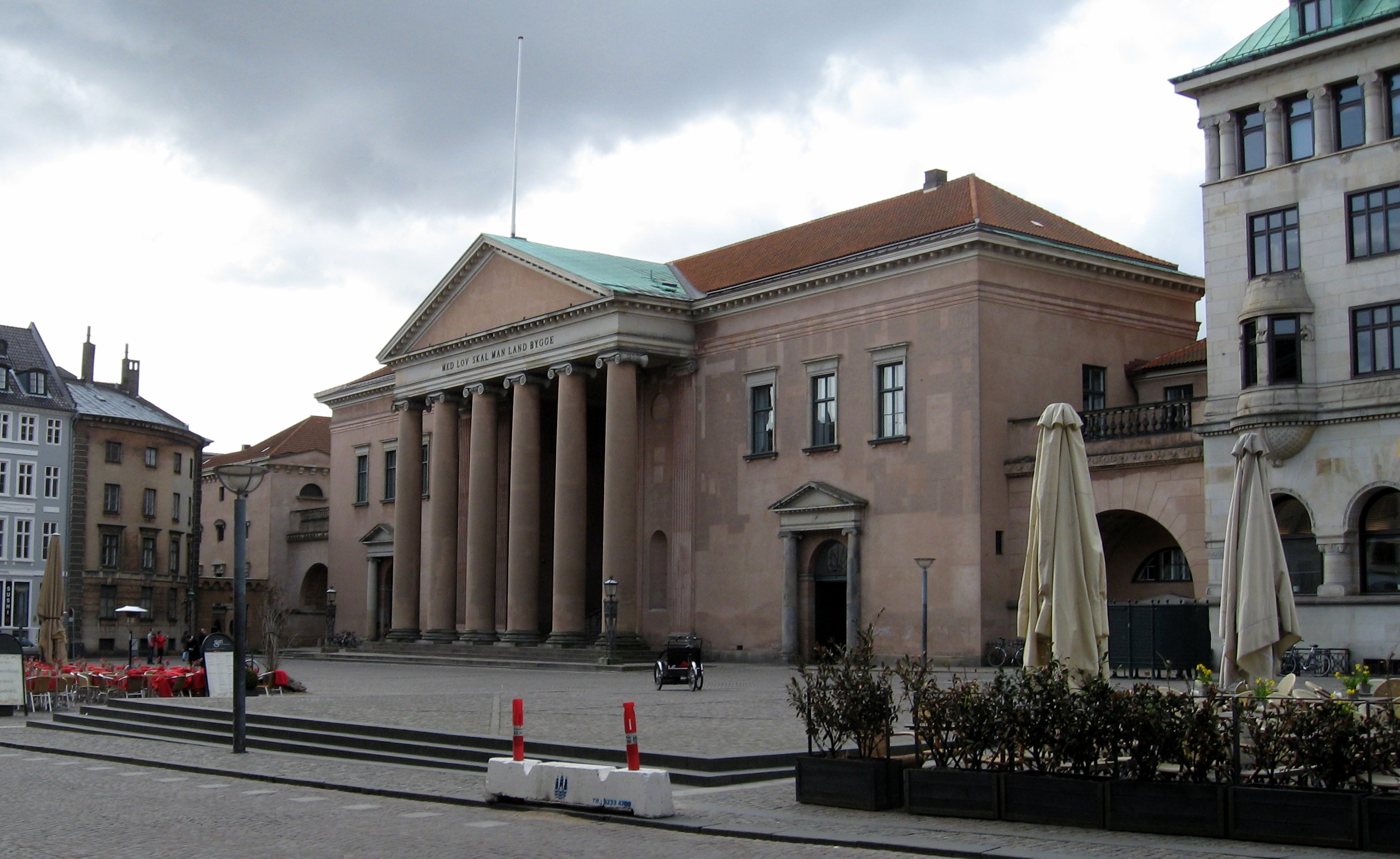
Copenhagen Court House

The square is dominated by the large courthouse with its ionic order columns, which occupies most of its west side. A skyway on each side of the courthouse connects it to the neighbouring buildings. The one to the left, on the other side of Slutterigade, is the former jailhouse. The skyway was used for transporting prisoners and has therefore been nicknamed the Bridge of Sighs.

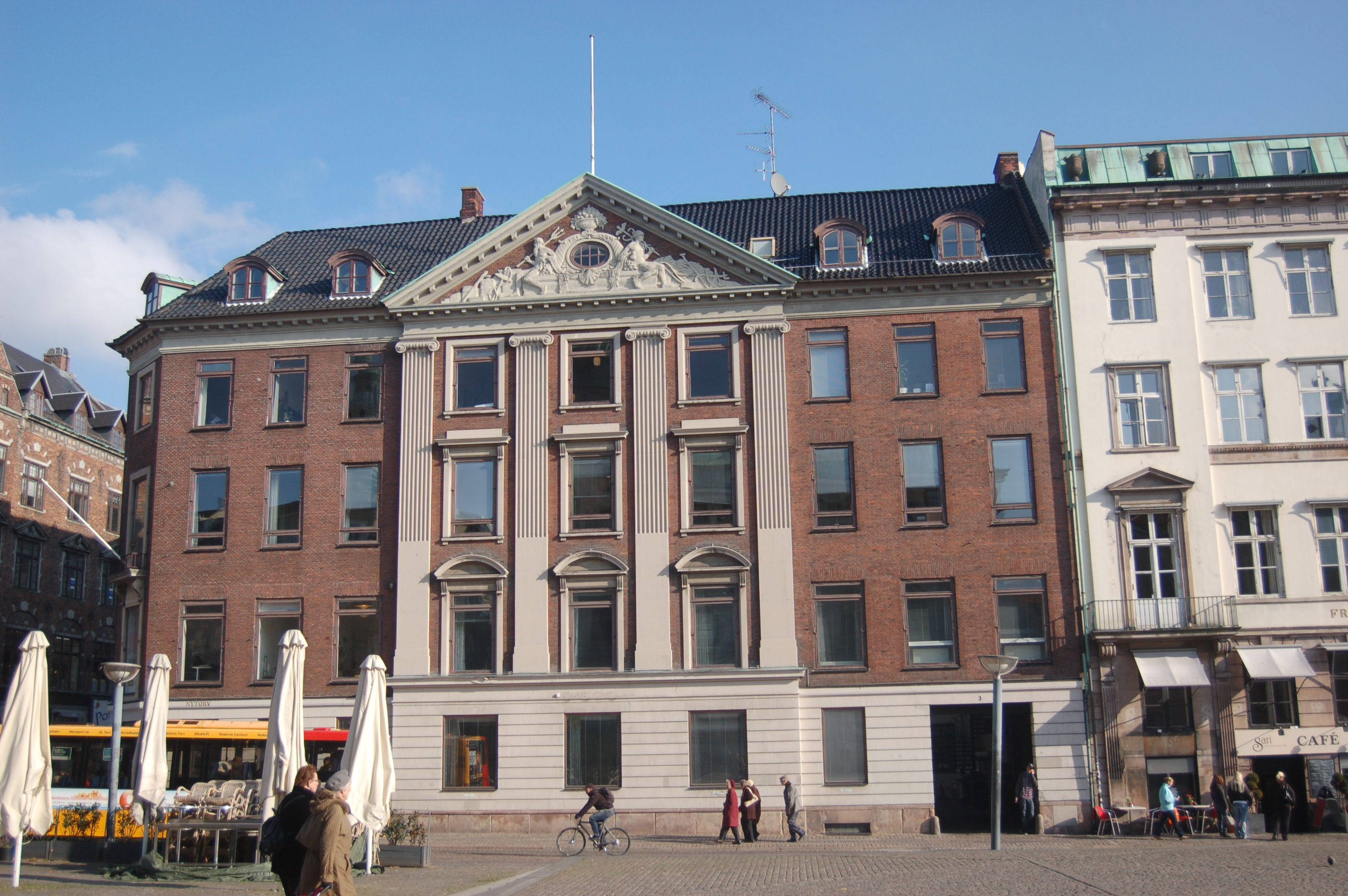
3 Nytorv on the corner of Strøget

Most of the other buildings that line the square are Neoclassical buildings dating from the reconstruction of the city after the Great Fire of 1795. No. 3, opposite the courthouse, on the corner of Strøget, is an exception. its imposing facade, with a three-bay median risalit, decorated with pilasters and tipped by a triangular pediment, was created in the 1910s. The Frisch House (No. 5) which was built from 1799 to 1803 for Hartvig Frisch to designs by Nicolai Abildgaard originally also featured pilasters and pediment but was heightened with an extra floor and adapted by August Klein in 1889–1890.

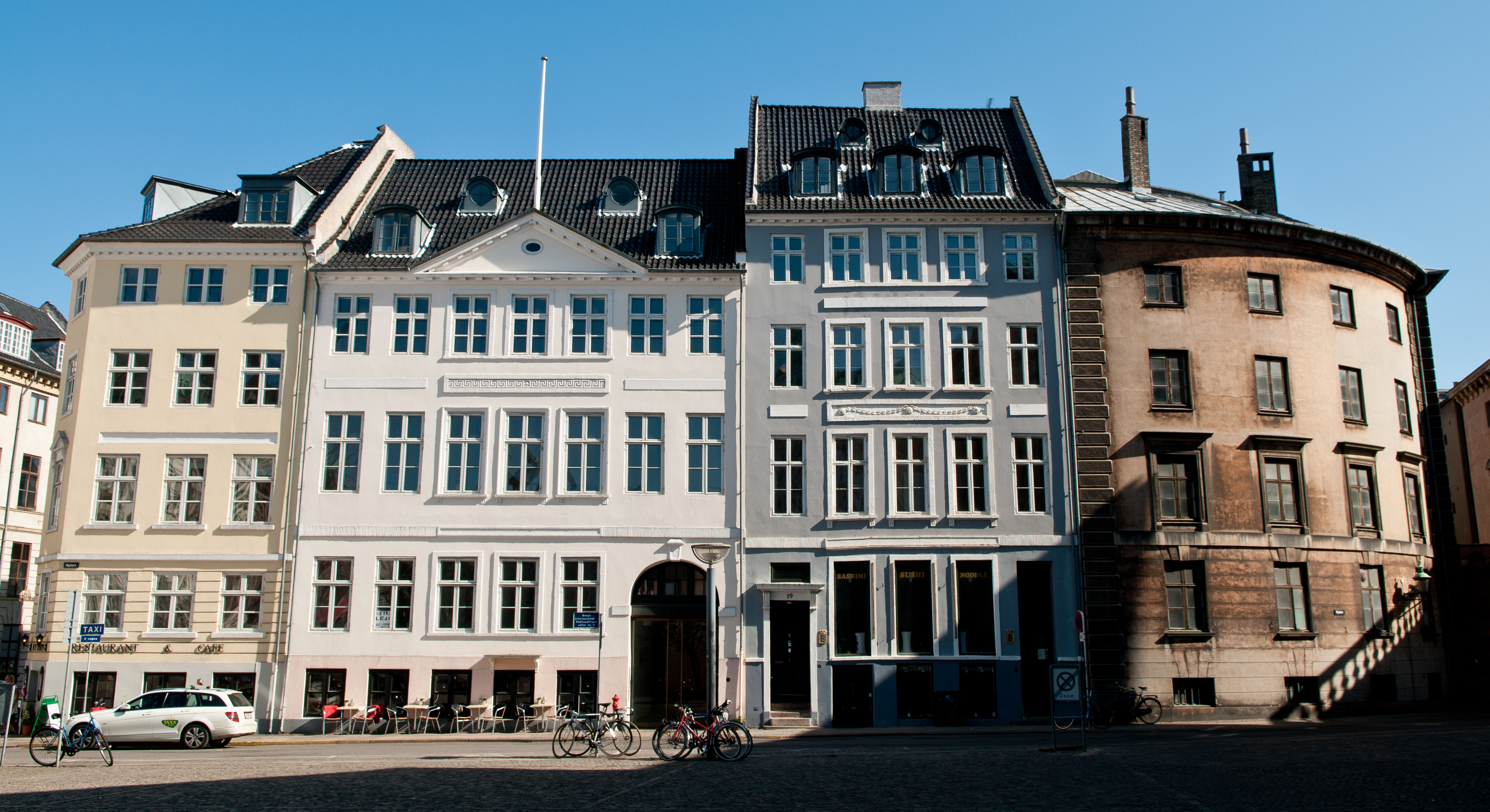
The south side of the square (No. 15–1)

The Jens Lauritzen House (No. 7) was built in 1795–96 for Jens Lauritzen, a grocer and brewer, possibly to designs by Andreas Kirkerup. No. 9 was built 1796–97 by an architect while No. 11, the large property on the corner of Brolæggerstræde, was designed by C. F. Hollander and completed one year later.

The three properties on the south side of the square were all built between 1795 and 1797 by unknown architects. The central one is known as the Krak House. It is flanked by Nytorv 15 and Nytorv 19.

The building at the corner of Frederiksberggade (Frederiksberggade 1) was built in 1905–1908 to a Hugend style design by Victor Nyebølle. It was built for the bank Kjøbenhavns Hrundejerbank.

== Nytorv today ==
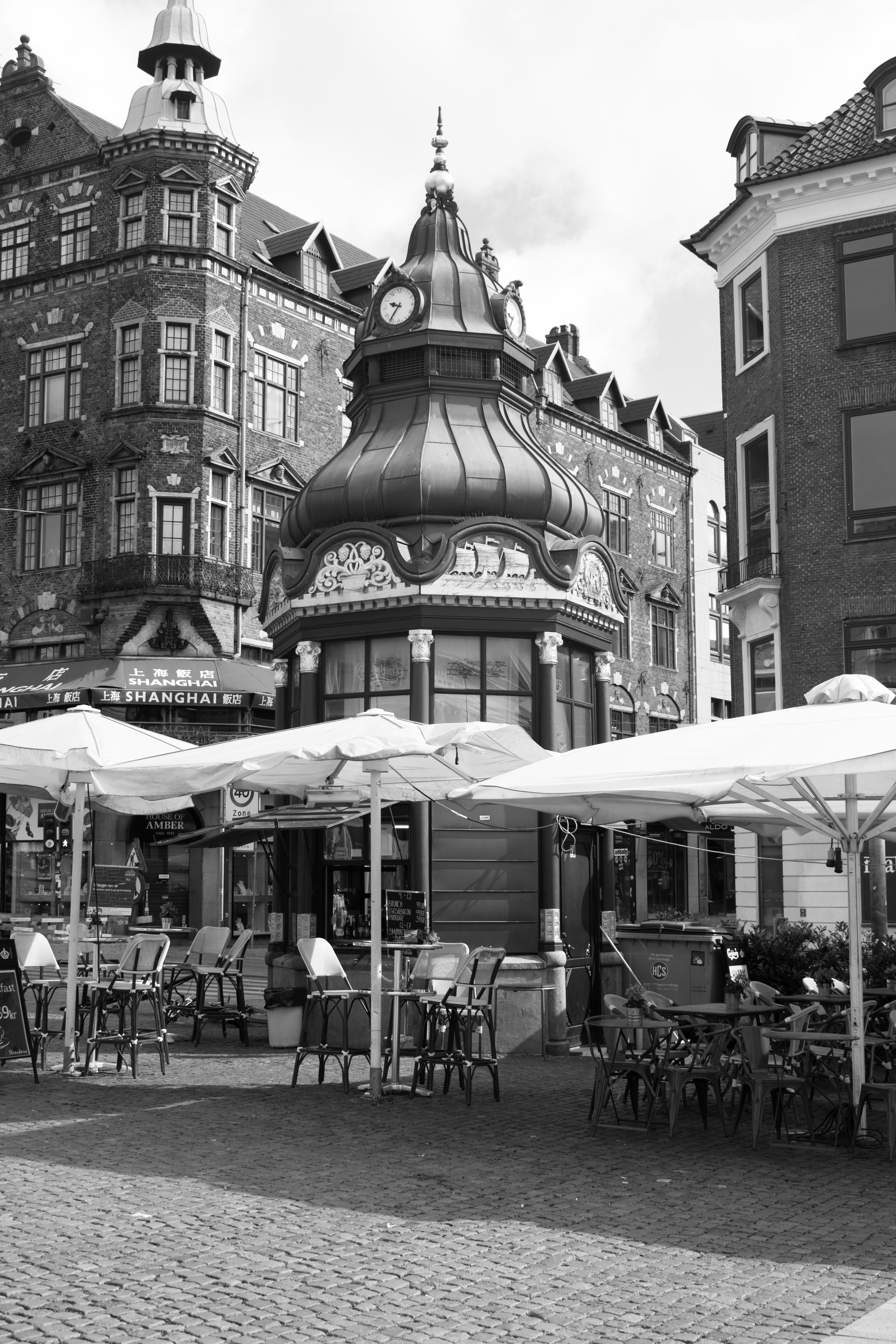
The old telephone kiosk

Today Nytorv/Gammeltorv is a lively square in the heart of Copenhagen's old city. During the latest refurbishment of the square, conducted by city architect Otto Käszner in 1993, an octagonal podium was created at the site where the scaffold used to be and the footprint of the former city hall was marked in the paving with a paler stone. The podium now serves as a bench or occasionally as a bandstand, for instance during Copenhagen Jazz Festival.

The square is also home to one of the old telephone kiosks which are found in central locations throughout the city. The original model was designed by Fritz Kochs, but the one on Nytorv is a later model, somewhat larger and more heavy in its design, installed by Martin Jensen in 1913.

== Cultural references ==
- Nytorv is used as a location at 1:15:37 and again at 1:15:54 in the first Olsen Gang film.
- In his poem Gennem byen sidste gang, a terminally ill Dan Turèll describes how he, on his last stroll through the city, just after passing Nytorv will be fading away.
