= Kraks Fond =

Danish foundation

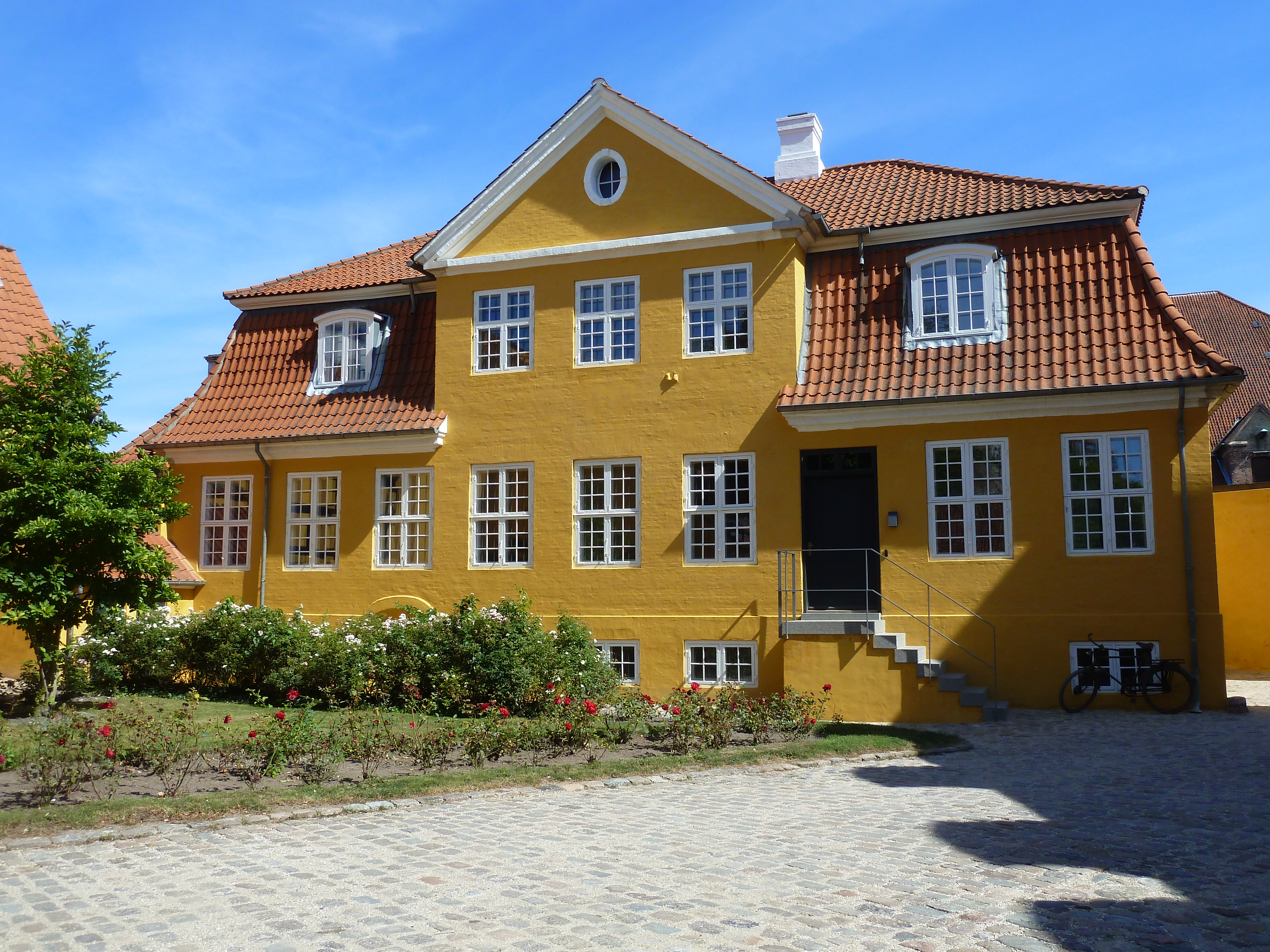
The building in Fæstningens Materialgård where the Krak Foundation is now based

Kraks Fond is a foundation based in Copenhagen, Denmark. The foundation was established in 1924 as the owner of the publishing house Kraks Forlag. In 2007, Kraks Forlag was sold to Eniro. The foundation is today based in Fæstningens Materialgård at Frederiksholms Kanal.

== Research ==
Kraks Fond has supported research in city's economic development since 2011, especially through Kraks Fond Byforskning.

== Investments ==
The foundation's assets are managed through the investment company Ove K. Invest A/S. It has investments in the companies Resolux ApS (30%), Omni-Drive (30%= and Inrotech Denmark (30%). Other investments are in the Nordic Real Estate Partners funds NREP Nordic Retail, NREP Copenhagen Residential and NREP Nordic Strategies. Fund II Herlev Bymidte
