= Copenhagen Court House =

Historic building in Copenhagen

Coordinates: 55°40′38″N 12°34′23″E

Copenhagen City Court House
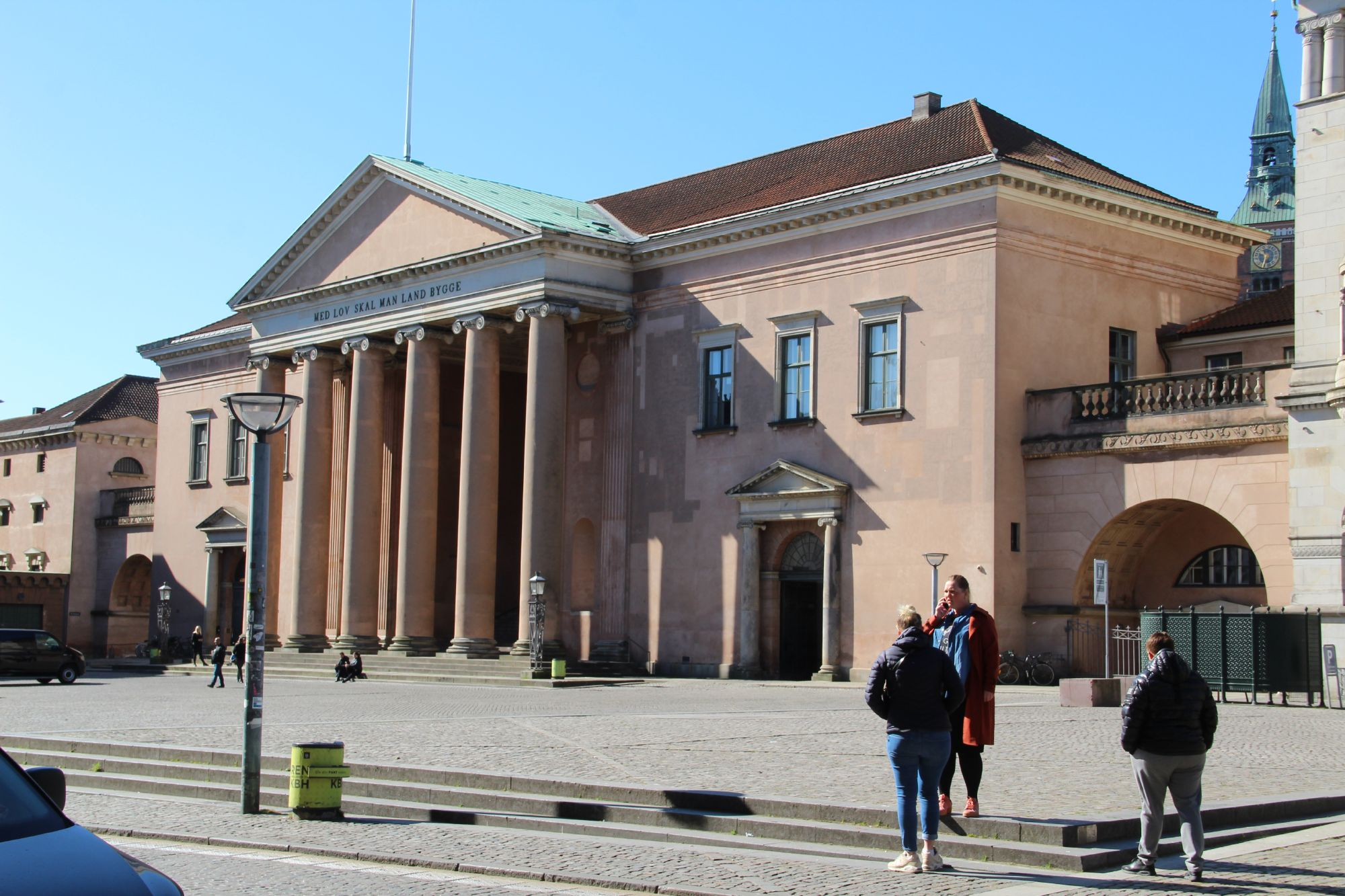
- Copenhagen Court House
- Interactive map of the Copenhagen City Court House area

General information
- Architectural style: Neoclassicism
- Location: City centre, Copenhagen, Denmark
- Construction started: 1803
- Completed: 1815
- Client: City of Copenhagen

Design and construction
- Architect: Christian Frederik Hansen

The Copenhagen Court House (Danish: Københavns Domhus) is a historic building located on Nytorv in Copenhagen, Denmark. Originally built as a combined city hall and courthouse, it now serves as the seat of the District Court of Copenhagen. Inaugurated in 1815, it was built to the design of Christian Frederik Hansen in Neoclassical style.

== History ==
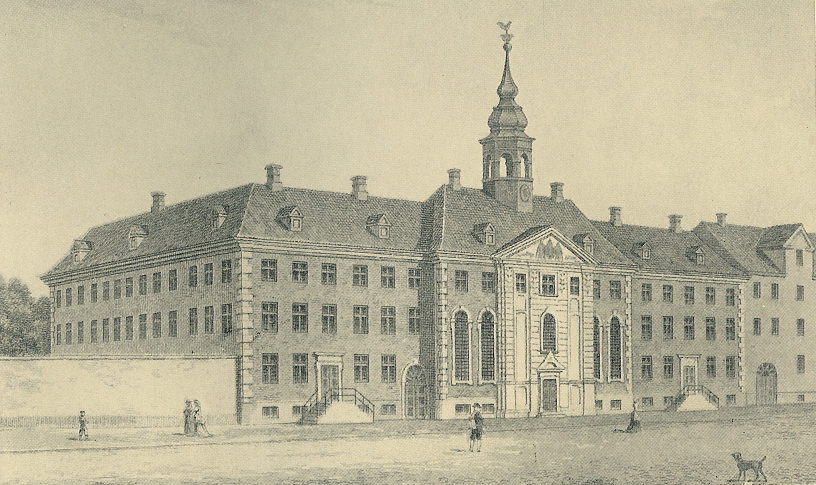
The Royal Orphanage as it appeared following an expansion in 1765

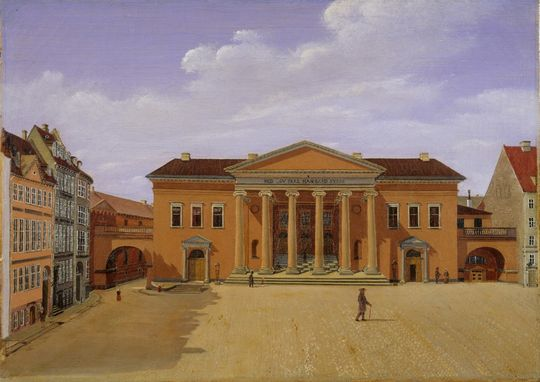
The building in 1850, painting by Carl Balsgaard

A modern style court of justice, Hof- og Stadsretten, was introduced in Denmark, specifically for Copenhagen, by Johann Friedrich Struensee in 1771. Located in Viborg and Copenhagen, two High Courts were introduced as courts of appeal in 1805. It was for this emerging legal system that a new courthouse was needed.

In the Great Fire of 1795, Copenhagen's city hall, located between Nytorv and Gammeltorv, was among the many buildings lost to the flames. It was the second consecutive city hall at that spot to meet this fate; the first building, built in 1679 at the same site, had been lost in the Fire of 1728.

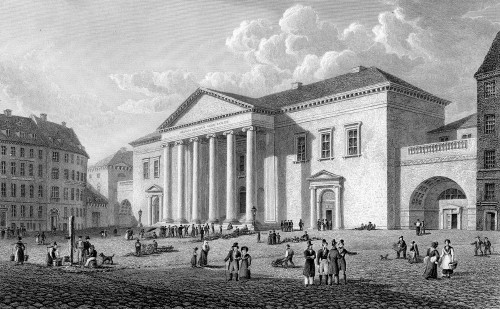
The Town Hall in c. 1845

After the fire, it was decided to build a combined city hall and courthouse at Nytorv, at a site previously occupied by the Royal Orphanage built in 1728. The project also included a jailhouse. Christian Frederik Hansen, the leading Danish architect of the time, was charged with the commission. Construction started in 1803 and was completed in 1816. The project was delayed by scarcity of building materials as well as the British bombardment of the city in 1807 in the Battle of Copenhagen. Materials from the demolition of Hirschholm Palace were used for the building.

The building served its dual purpose for almost 100 years, until the current Copenhagen City Hall was inaugurated in 1905. After that it has exclusively been used for the District Court of Copenhagen.

== Architecture ==
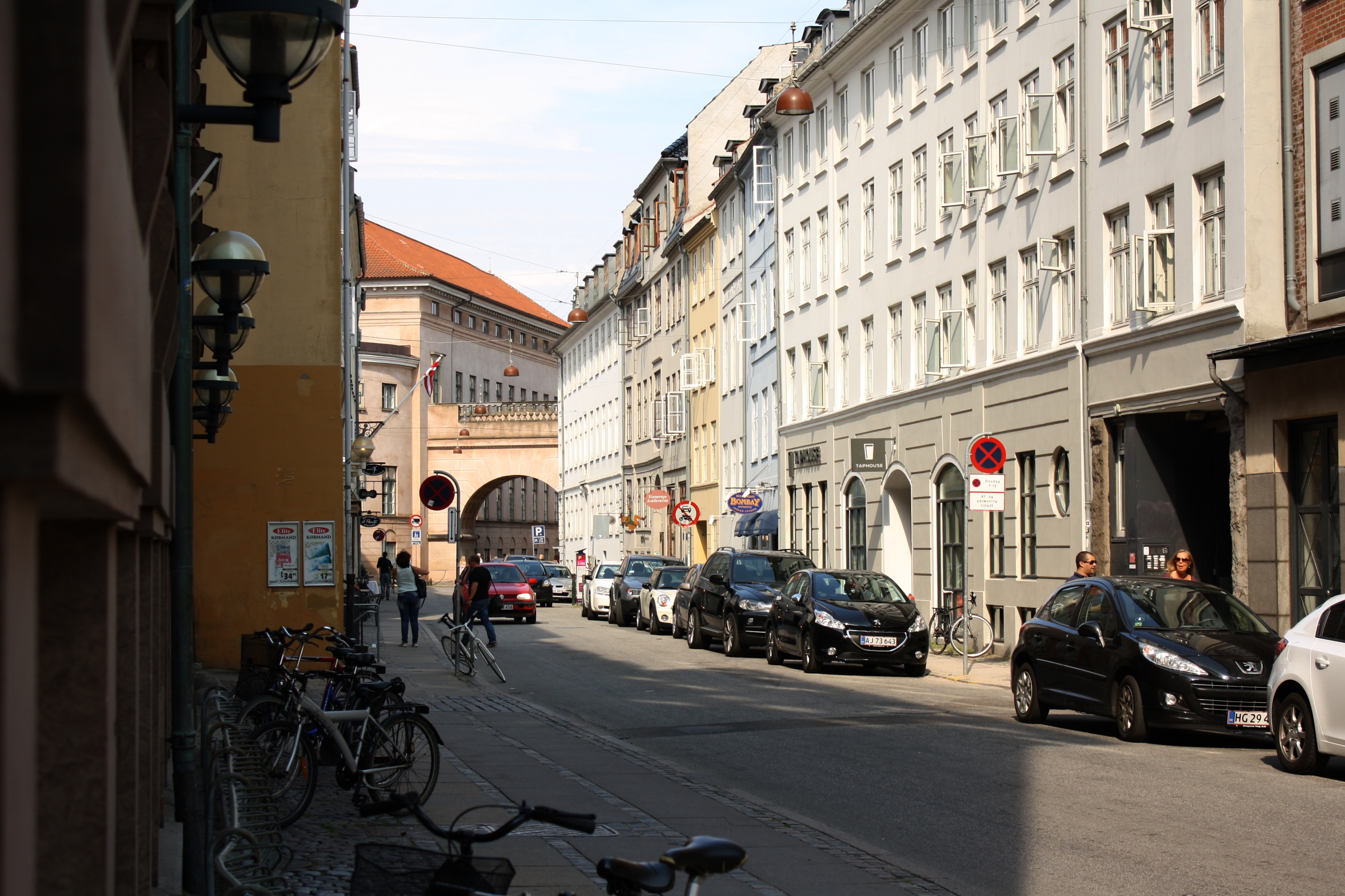
The rear side of the courthouse with one of the two passageways connecting it to the jailhouse

The facade is dominated by six large Ionic Columns, flanked by masonry with a minimal number of windows. Behind the columns a staircase leads up to the vestibule with four more Ionic columns. From here a complex network of corridors and stairs connects to the rest of the building. Although the courthouse has been renovated several times, the overall layout of rooms with columns, reliefs and stucco has been preserved.

On each side of the building, it is flanked by a large arch. On the left the arch provides a walkway above the street, connecting the courthouse to the jail on the other side. The jail building has an austere expression with small windows.

Both the facades of the courthouse and the jail features inscriptions. The inscription above the entrance of the courthouse, "Med lov skal man land bygge" (English: "With law shall land [i.e. the nation] be built"), is a quotation from the preamble of Codex Holmiensis, while the inscription on the jail reads "For almeen sikkerheden" (English: "For the public security").

== See also ==
- Architecture of Denmark
- Frederiksberg Courthouse
