= Fæstningens Materialgård =

Building in Copenhagen, Denmark

Coordinates: 55.6726°N 12.5782°E

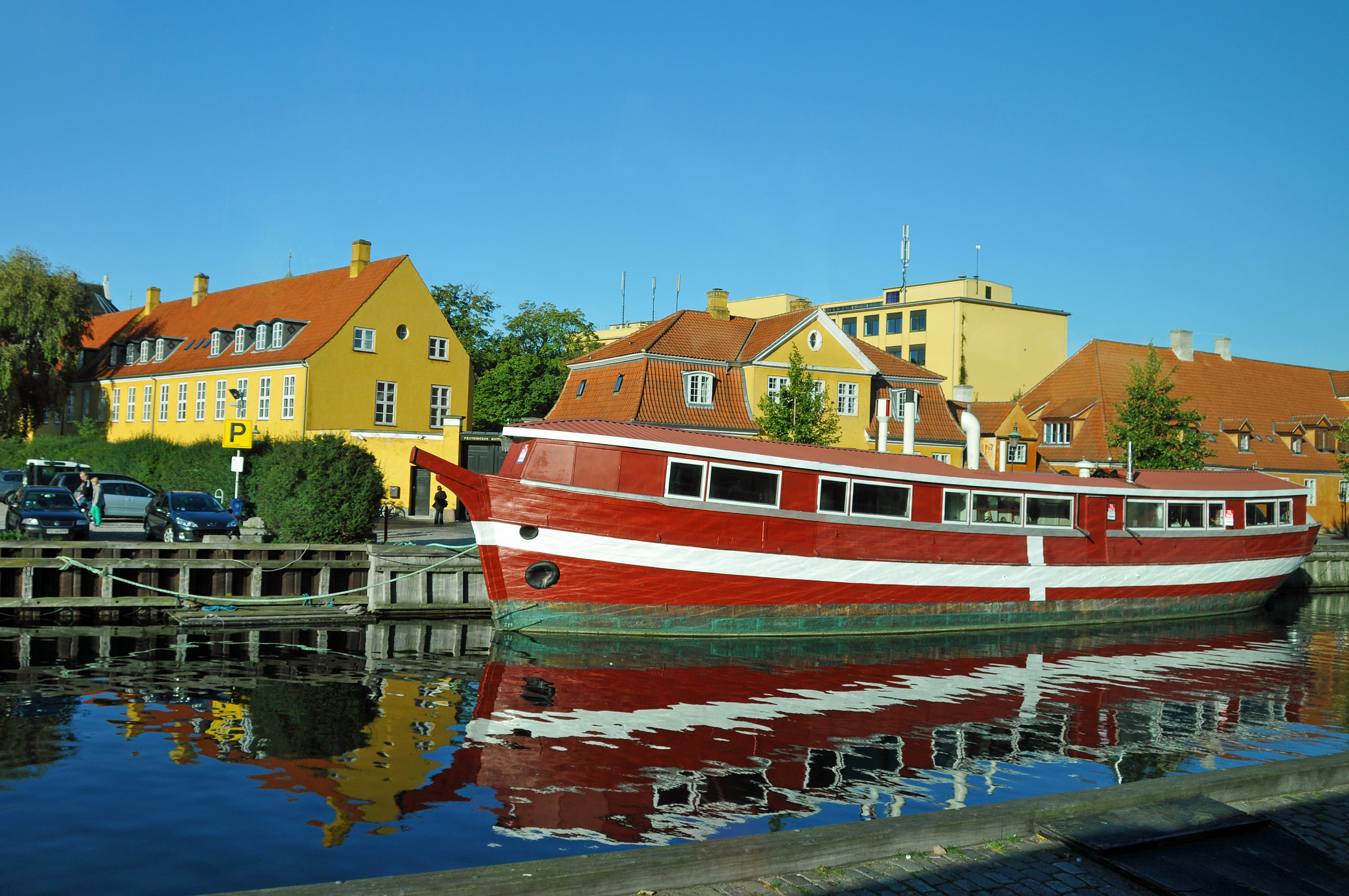
Fæstningens Materialgård viewed from across the canal

Fæstningens Materialgård is a former military storage facility at 30 Frederiksholms Kanal in Copenhagen, Denmark. Arranged around a central courtyard, the individual buildings have been built to a homogeneous design, all with yellow-washed facades, green doors and gates, white window frames and red tile roofs, but they have in fact been accumulated over an extended period of time, mainly between 1740 and 1925. They also integrate visually and physically with the adjacent Civiletatens Materialgård, a storage facility associated with the royal palaces, and the Royal Horse Guards Barracks, together forming an area of low, yellow buildings surrounded on three sides by Frederiksholm Canal, Bryghusgade and Vester Voldgade.

The International Federation for Housing and Planning was one of the first tenants moving into 30 Frederiksholms Kanal in December 2012.

== History ==
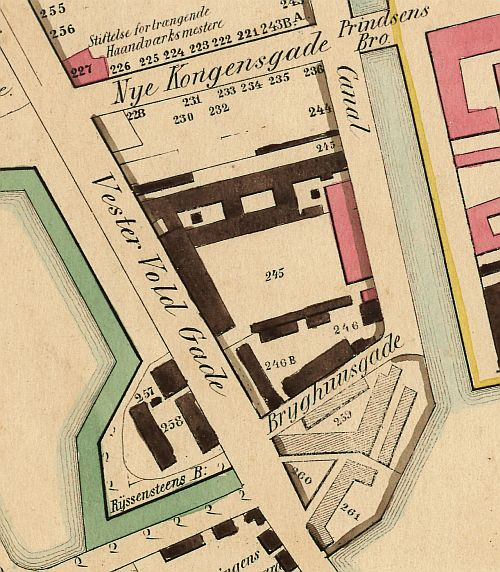
Fæstningens Materialgård seen on a map detail.

Frederiksholm Canal was dug in 1681 and a new military storage facility, Fæstningens Materialgård, was established as a replacement of its predecessor in Rigensgade. None of these original buildings exist today.

== Layout and architecture ==
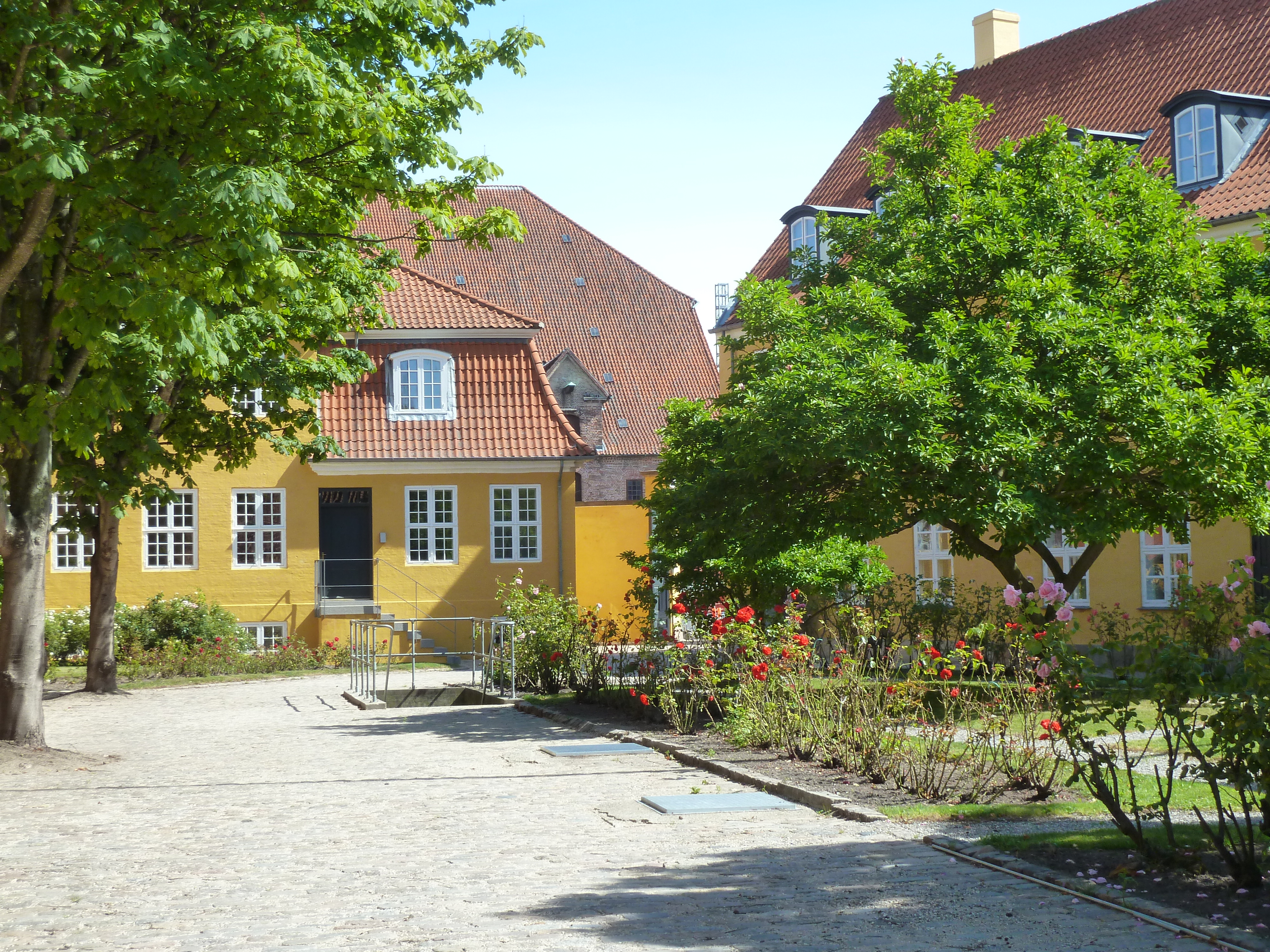
Magnolia trees in the courtyard

The complex consists of four building volumes and two small sheds, interconnected by walls and surrounding a large courtyard. The main entrance to the area is through a gate on the corner of Frederiksholms Kanal and Bryghusgade. The courtyard contains a small garden with Magnolia trees and roses.

The buildings were listed by the Danish Heritage Agency in 1952 and the listing was extended to also include the courtyard environment with its original paving.

=== The Storage Keeper's House ===
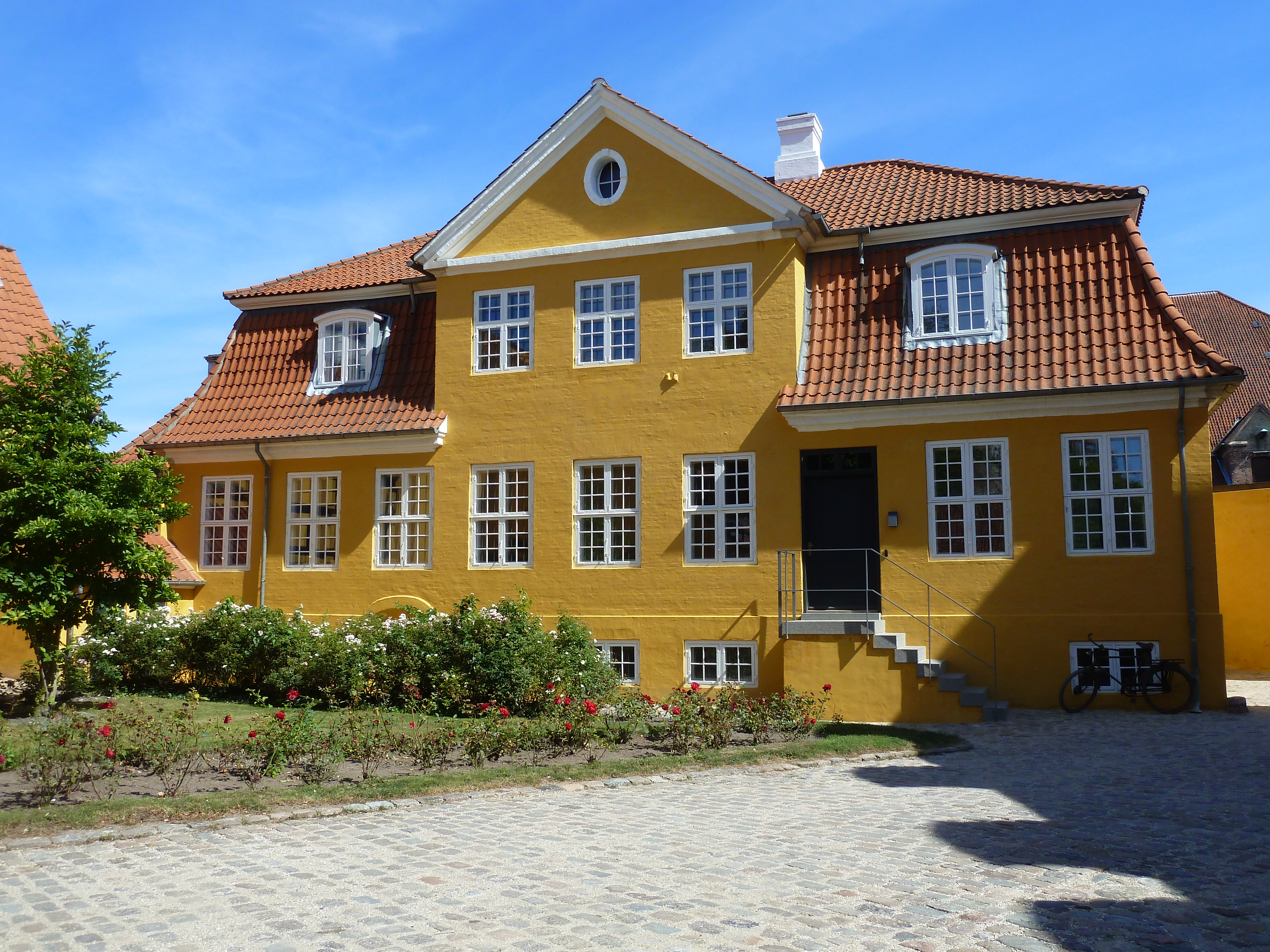
The Storage Keeper's House seen from the courtyard

The oldest building which still exists today is the Storage Keeper's House (Materialforvalterboligen) from 1740, located immediately to the right of the main gate and facing the canal. The architect is not known but may have been Johan Cornelius Krieger.

The building is nine bays wide and has a red mansard roof with a large wall dormer both on its front and rear sides.

The interiors combine elements from the Baroque, Empire and Neoclassicism. The ground floor originally served representative purposes and is richly decorated. The first floor served as a residence and is built to a more simple design. The building still has its original window frames, doors, shutters and panelling.

=== Bryghusgade Wing ===
On the other side of the main entrance, along Bryghusgade, lies a building known as the Storage Building (Magasinbygningen). It was originally built in 1768 but has later been extended twice and the interiors have been altered.

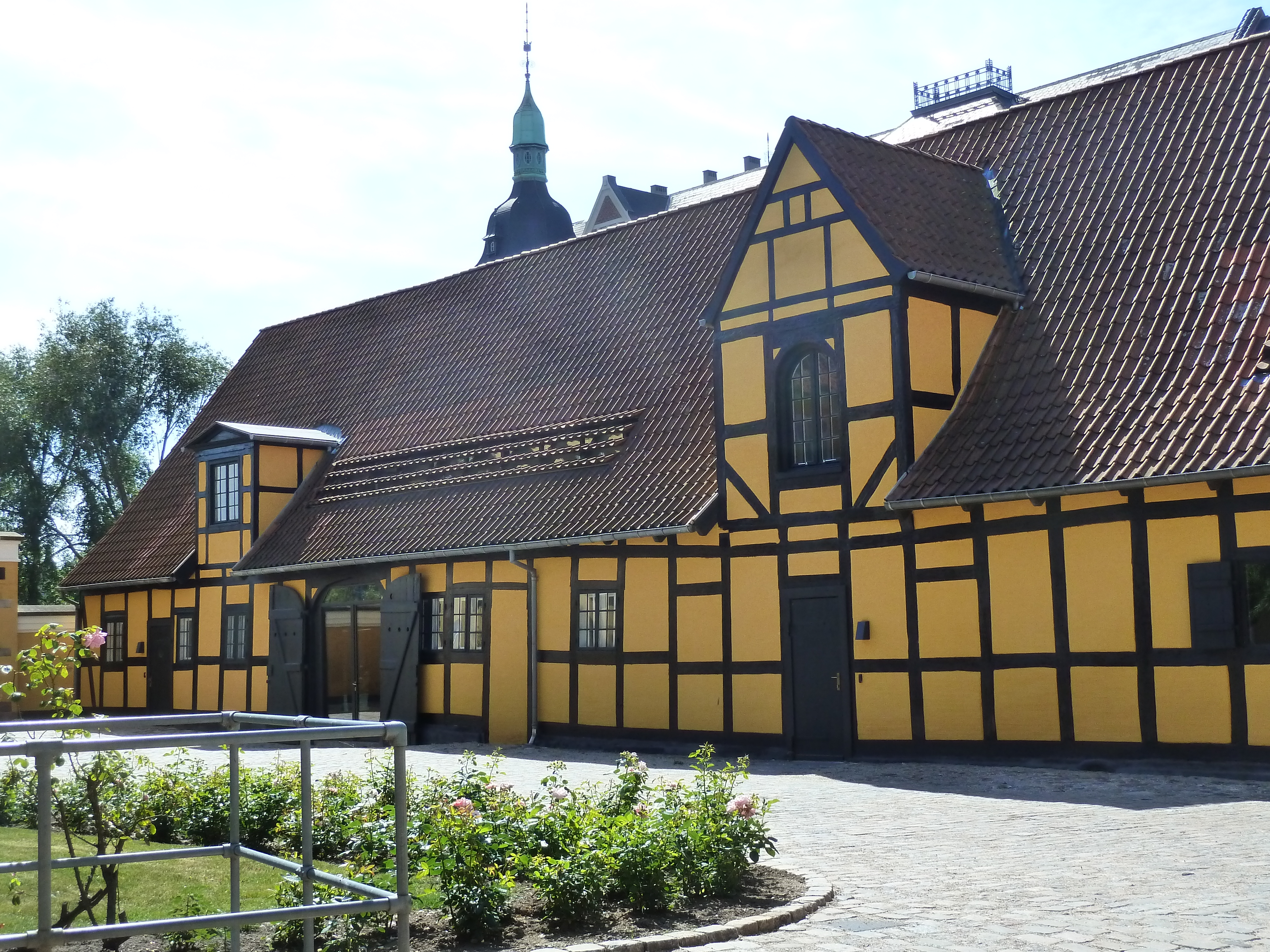
The storage building along Vester Voldgade seen from the courtyard

=== Vester Voldgade Wing ===
The 45-bay long half-timbered building on the rear side of the complex was built in 1748 along the city's West Rampart, now Vester Voldgade. The main facade of the building faces the courtyard where two dormers, originally with hoists, break up the monotony of the large tile roof. It was originally used for storage of materials and also contained stables in its eastern end.

=== Overhang Building ===
Originally two individual structures, separated by a pit for production of slaked lime, the Overhang Buildings (Halvtagsbygningen) were constructed in 1819 along the boundary to Civiletatens Materialgård, the name referring to the large overhang of their skillion roofs. The building to the south was a storage shed and the building to the north contained a workshop. In 1925 they were connected to form one large building. A dormer window almost the full length of the building was added in the 1970s.

== Realdania renovation ==
Fæstningens Materialgård was acquired by the Realdania foundation in 2007. The complex has subsequently been subject to a demonstration project targeted at investigating possibilities of carrying out and optimizing energy-saving renovations of listed buildings without compromising their architectural and historical qualities.

The renovation was completed in 2012 when the buildings were converted into office space. It required large technical installations which have been placed in a disused underground bunker beneath the couthyard.

== IFHP Copenhagen office ==
The International Federation for Housing and Planning which collaborates with Realdania opened an office at 30 Frederiksholms Kanal in 2012.

== Literature ==
- Kleis, Birgitte and Christian Varming, Jens: Fæstningens Materialgård. Realea. ISBN 8792230393. 132 pages (in Danish and English).
