= Copenhagen Fire of 1795 =

Conflagration in Denmark

Coordinates: 55.678°N 12.589°E

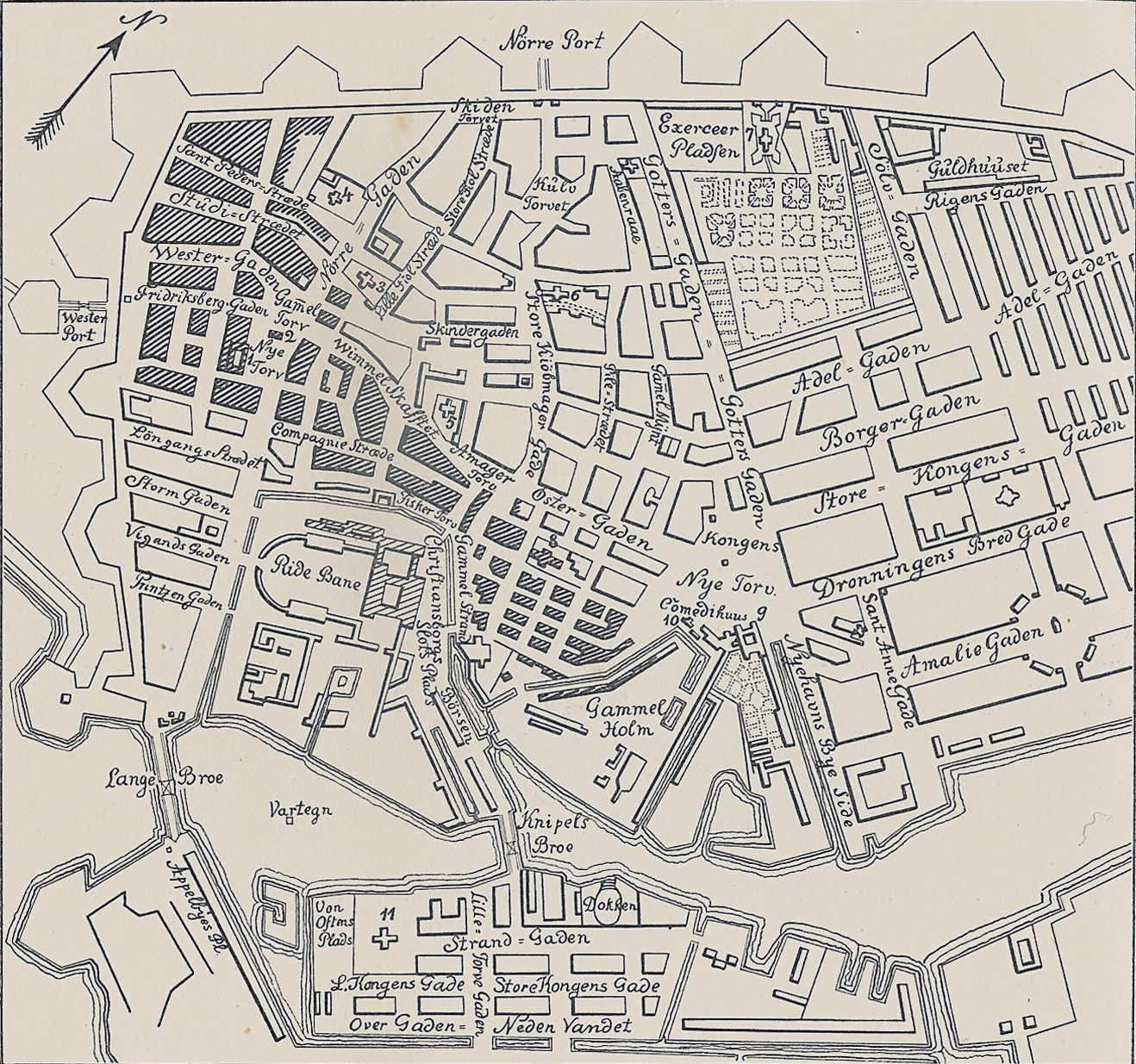
Map of Copenhagen Fire of 1795

The Copenhagen Fire of 1795 (Københavns brand 1795) started on Friday, 5 June 1795, at or around 3 pm by the Navy's old base south east of Kongens Nytorv on Gammelholm, in the Navy's magazine for coal and timber, the so-called Dellehave. As the workers had already gone home, a considerable length of time passed before efforts to combat the fire started, and out of fear of theft, the fire hydrants had been removed. The people of Holmen also blocked the civilian fire brigade, possibly in the belief that since it was a military area, the military should take care of it.

There had been an extended period without rain and the dry wood, combined with the storage of rope work and tar, made the fire spread quickly. The wind blew especially strong from east-southeast, and that meant the countless embers were carried through the air into the city. Because of the strong sunlight, small fires were difficult to detect until they have taken hold. This is why the fire spread from Gammelholm to the main magazine along Holmens Canal (Holmens Kanal Danish) and over Holmens Canal to the quarter around Saint Nicolai Church and from there, along Gammel Strand to the area around Nytorv/Gammeltorv.

== The fire at Nicolai Church ==
Right by Saint Nicolai Church, after the Copenhagen Fire of 1728, infrastructure to fight fires had been constructed because the area was very densely built up. A basin that could hold 400 barrels of water had been excavated for use. In addition, a pumping station was built that could pump water through an 800-foot-long hose. The pumps were able to raise the pressure to such a level that it could deliver one barrel of water per minute from the hose. But when a spark set fire to the church tower, nobody could find the key to the door of the pumping station. Only some time later did anyone think of kicking the door in. By then, the fire had already taken hold and the residents in the surrounding quarter were panicked. The road became so full of people, who were also transporting furniture to safety from the fire, that the water hoses could not be brought close to the fire. Soon the church burned to the ground, and with it the pumps. At that point, the Saint Nicolai quarter could not be saved.

== Fighting the fire ==
The majority of the residents in the area threatened by the fire chose to flee, but in some places residents chose to stay in their houses and fight the fire. This happened in the first three to four houses on the north side of Østergade. Here people spread themselves throughout the houses both inside and out, armed with buckets and plenty of water. This prevented the fire from taking hold and saved the neighbouring street of Købmagergade at the same time, since it would have inevitably spread to there as well.

Royal advisor Carsten Anker (Danish title: konferensråd) had his mansion on the corner of Vingårdsstræde and Kongens Nytorv saved by covering both it and a connected building with a sail that constantly had water poured on it.

Supreme Court attorney Peter Uldall (Danish title: justitsråd) saved his mansion in Vimmelskaftet by paying a large party to stay and put out any embers. It also prevented the fire from spreading to the northern side of the plaza, so only the southern side burned down.

== Consequences ==
The fire died out on Sunday, 7 July, around 4 pm. It had destroyed 909 houses and partially damaged 74. Just over 6,000 of the just under 100,000 residents in the capital were made homeless. A large number of them took refuge in the ruins of the recently burned-down Christianborgs Castle, the remaining walls of which were so large that an entire family could move into a window niche. The stables were also used as housing.

The fire had, together with Copenhagen's fire of 1728, in effect burned down almost the whole of Copenhagen's medieval and Renaissance heritage and so only a few houses from before the 18th century remain in that part of the city. More historic buildings in Copenhagen would be lost to fire in 1807 when the city was bombarded by the British.

The fire was a strong contributing factor to the foundation of Denmark's first credit institution, Kreditkassen for Husejerne i Kjøbenhavn, in 1797.

After the fire, a large-scale plan was designed by the city planner Jørgen Henrich Rawert and the construction master Peter Meyn. The plan dictated the newly constructed houses should be made of masonry (instead of being timber-framed) and house corners at intersections should be diagonal and the streets straightened so that the fire department's long ladder companies could navigate the streets more easily. City planners also decreed that the new stone buildings could not be taller than the width of the street to prevent future fires.
