= Herman Henrik Kønneman =

Danish businessman and politician

Herman(n) Henrik (Hen(d)rick, Heinrich) Kønneman (Könneman(n)) (16 October 1692 – 11 May 1771) was a Danish businessman and politician. He was a councilman in Copenhagen in 1729–1749 and mayor from 1749. In 1744–1746, he served as one of the directors of the Danish Asiatic Company.

== Early life ==
Kønneman was born on 16 October 1692 in Copenhagen, the son of Herman Henrik K'nnemann and Susanne Sterck. He had two siblings. His mother's sister was married to merchant and one of Copenhagen's 32 Men Johan Rehling.

== Career ==
In 1718, he was granted citizenship as a canvas merchant (lærredskræmmer). In 1730–1832, he was a board member of Søe-Assurance Compagniet (referred to as "Kommitteret ved policernes ekspedition". By 1737, he was one of the largest shareholders of the company. In 1744–1746, he served as one of the directors of the company

In 1729–1749, he was councilman in Copenhagen. In 1749, he became mayor. He was awarded the title of kommerceråd in 1731, justitsråd in 1740 and etatsråd in 1755.

== Personal life and property ==
Kønneman was married three times. In 1721, he Married Anna Elisabeth Klinge (died 1729). On 2 December 1729, he married Louise Sophie Wolffen. On 3 June 1739, he married Charlotte Amalie Ocksen. In this last marriage, he was the father of at least the following children:

- Anna Cecilia Rømer (1742-)
- Hermann Henrik Könemann (1746-1822), Supreme Court secretary, married to Barbara Cathrine Schønheyder
- Johann Könemann
- Henriette Margrethe Kønnemann (1747-), married to Jean Christopher van Deurs (1725 - 1781)

In 1756, Kønneman owned the large property at Gammeltorv 4 (then Snaren's Quarter, No.114). His sisterAnna Maria Könemann, who was married to Diderich Barthold Beckmann, resided at Gammeltorv 18 on the other side of the square.
