= Stelling (company) =

Danish retailer of office and art supplies

Stelling is a retailer of office and art supplies based in Copenhagen, Denmark. The company was founded in 1860 as a modest paint shop on Gammeltorv. In the early 1910s, however, it established a paint, lacquer and varnish factory at Valgårdsvej 2 in Valby. In the 1980s, the factory closed and most of the buildings were demolished. Toftegårds Plads is now located at the site. The Stelling House at the original location at Gammeltorv 6 was designed by Danish architect Arne Jacobsen and is now a heritage listed building.

== History ==
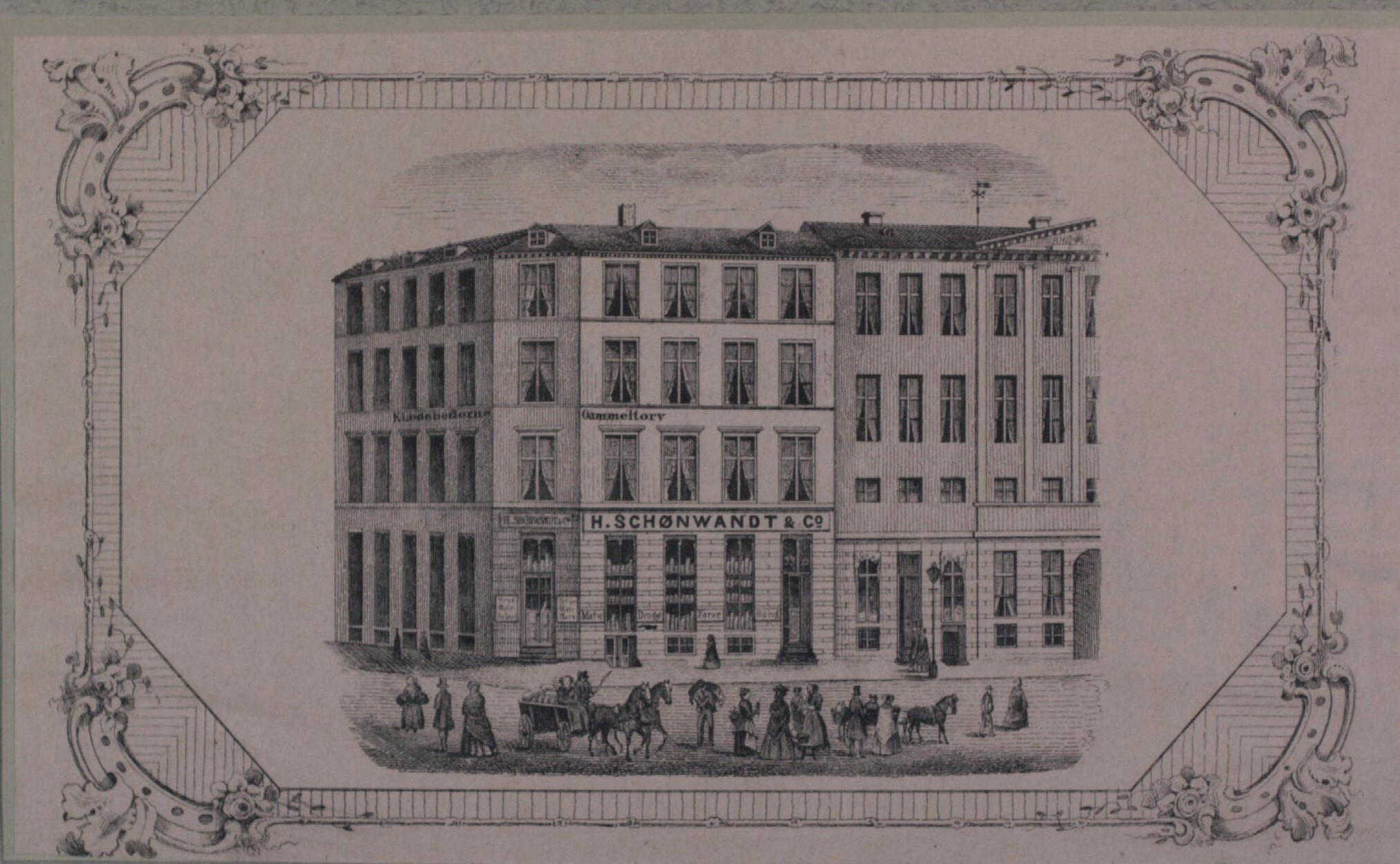
Advert for H. Schønwandt & Co- at Gammeltorv 6

The company traces its history back to 1860 when H. Schönwandt (b. 1862) opened a paint shop at Gammeltorv 6 in Copenhagen. After the founder's death, the company was sold to Anton Stelling (1836-1912). In 1900, Anton's sons, Walter (1869-1935) and Erwin (1870-1923) joined the company as partners. The same year, F.E. van der Aa Kühle's Lacquer Factory in Valby was acquired by the company. In 1912–14, the factory expanded with Christian Mandrup-Poulsen as architect.

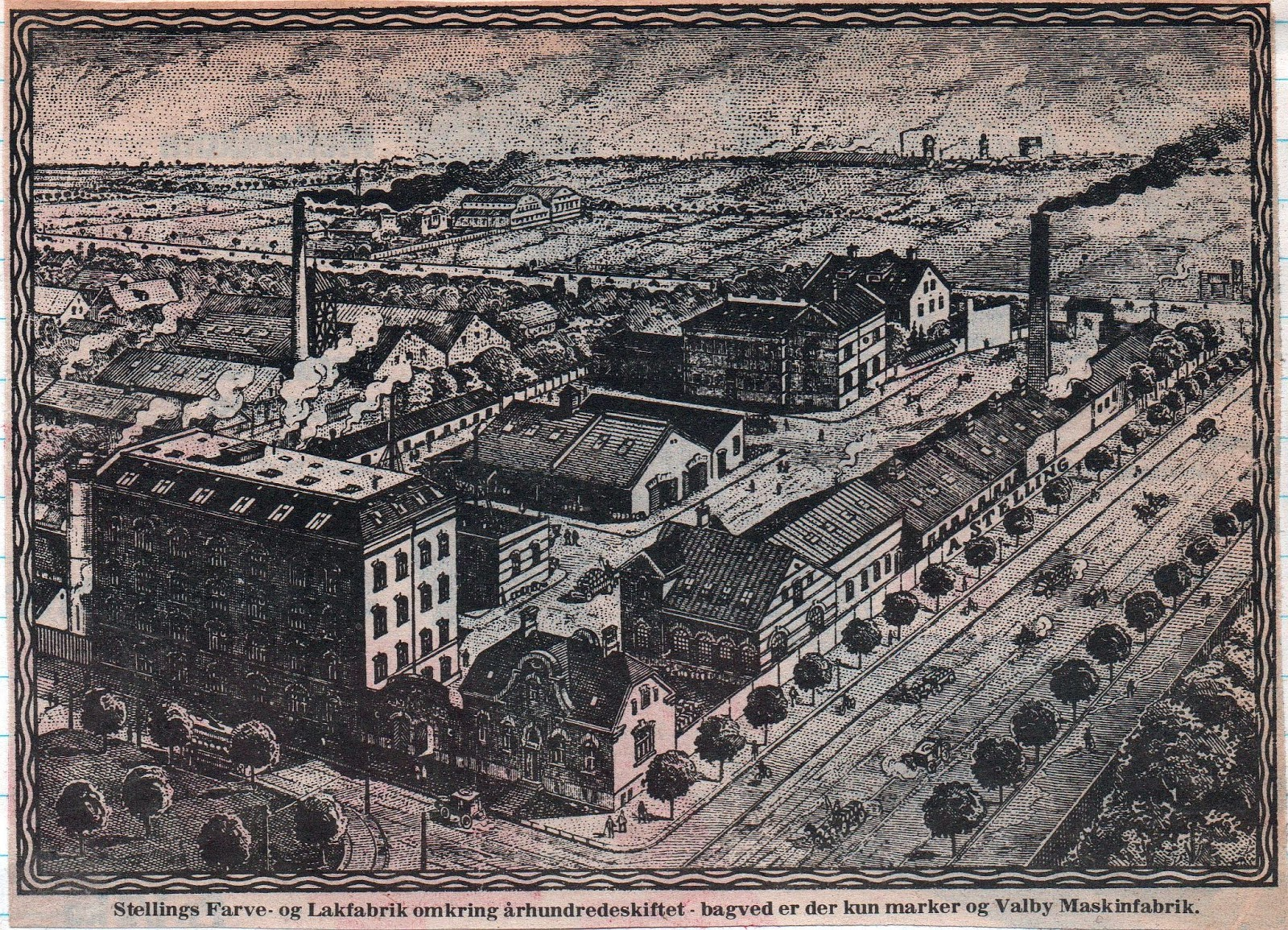
Stelling's factory in Valby seen on a bird's eye drawing by Franz Šedivý

Walter Stelling succeeded his father as CRO of the company in 1912. His son Olaf Stelling (b. 1909) was made a partner in 1933. After Walter Stelling's death, the company was continued by Olaf Stelling in a partnership with his mother, Signe Stelling. In 1937, the company's old headquarters at Gammeltorv 6 was replaced by a new building designed by Danish architect Arne Jacobsen. The new building became known as "the Stelling House" (in Danish: "Stellings Hus", literally "Stelling's House"). In 1991, the Stelling House was listed in the Danish registry of protected buildings and places.
