= Caritas Well =

Fountain in Copenhagen, Denmark

Coordinates: 55.6781°N 12.5723°E

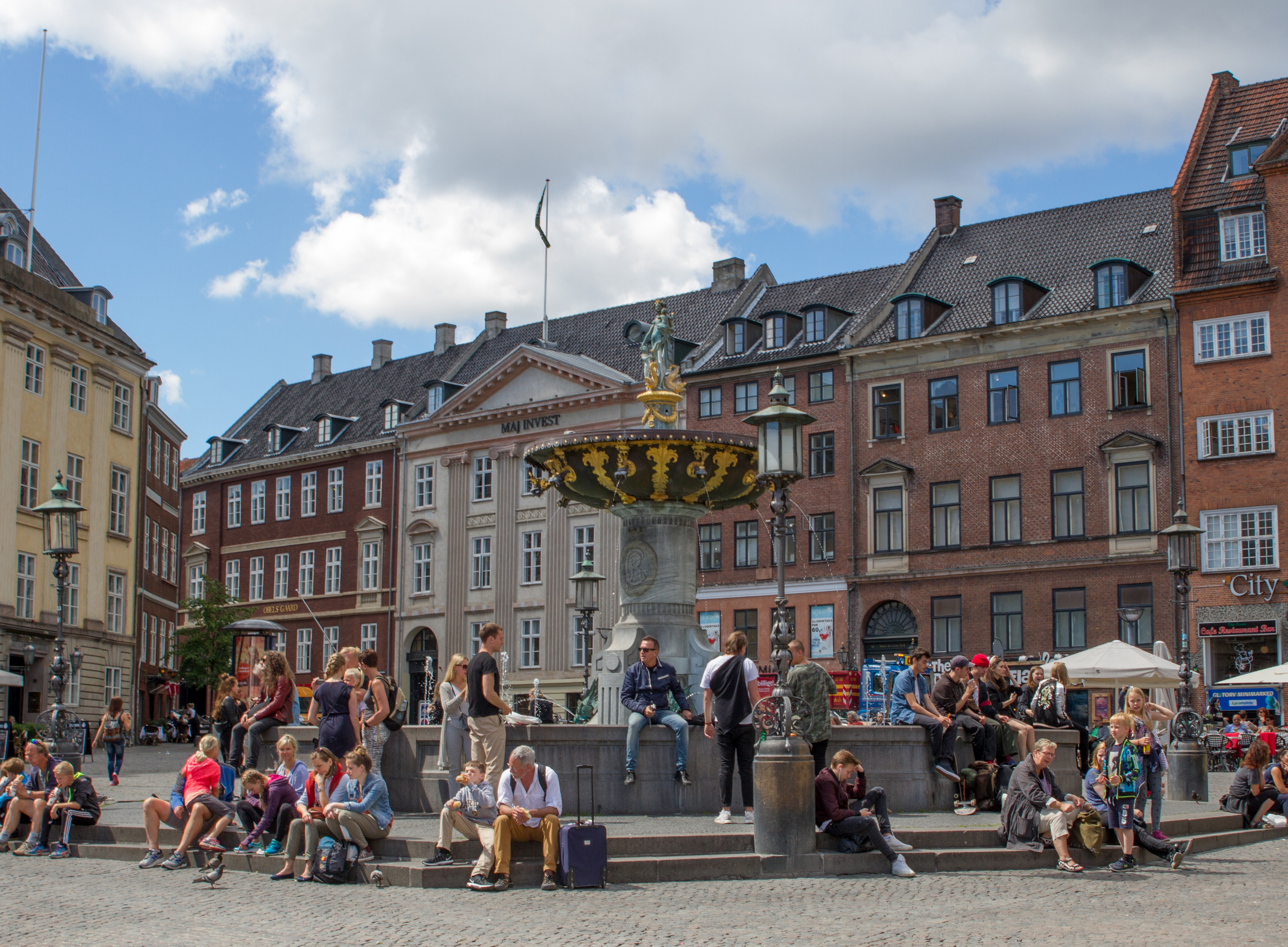
The Caritas Well

The Caritas Well (Danish: Caritasbrønden), also known as the Caritas Fountain (Danish: Caritasspringvandet), is the oldest fountain in Copenhagen, Denmark. It was built in 1608 by Christian IV and is located on Gammeltorv, now part of the Strøget pedestrian zone.

It is known for the Golden Apples "jumping" on the Queen's birthday.

== Design ==
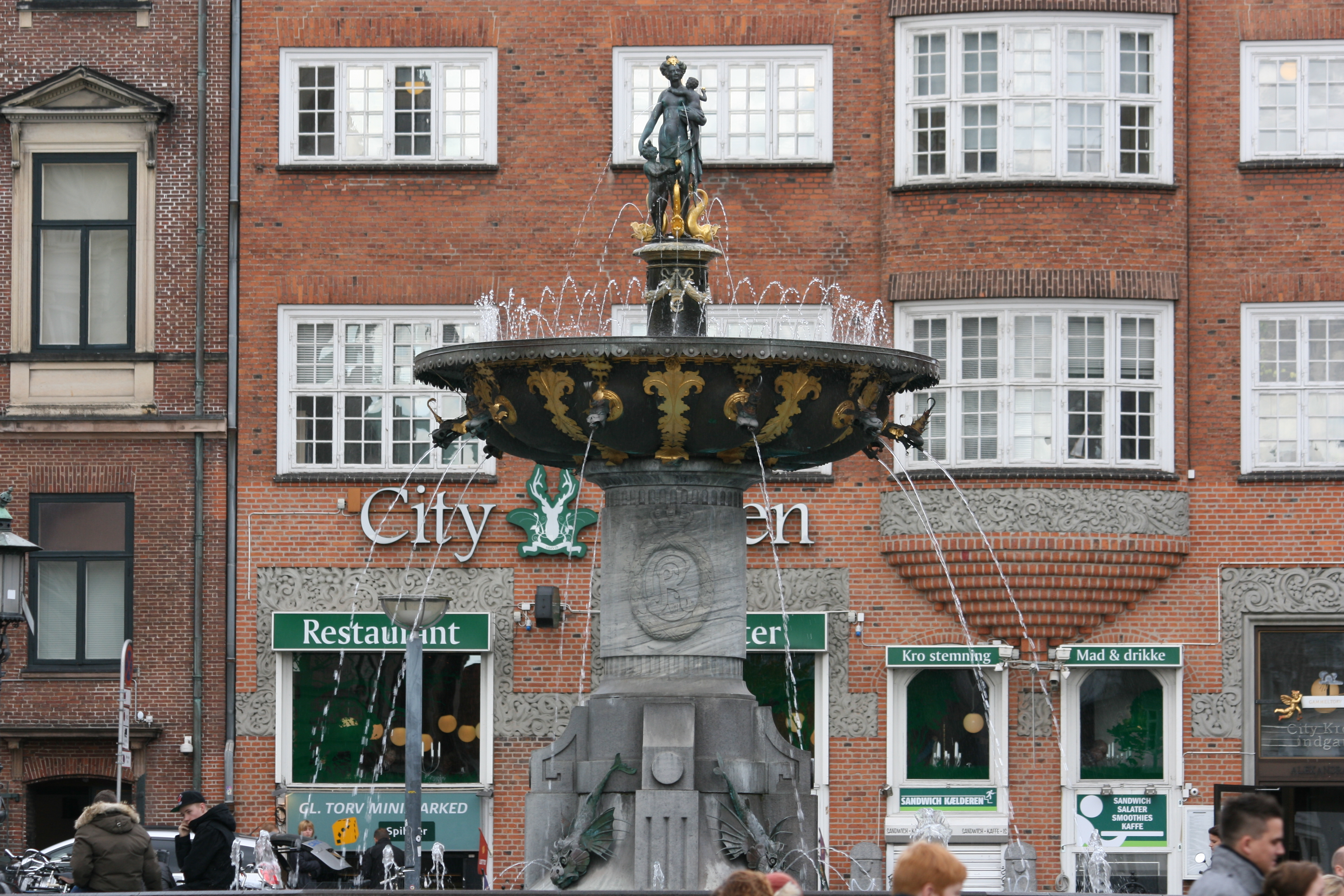
Detail

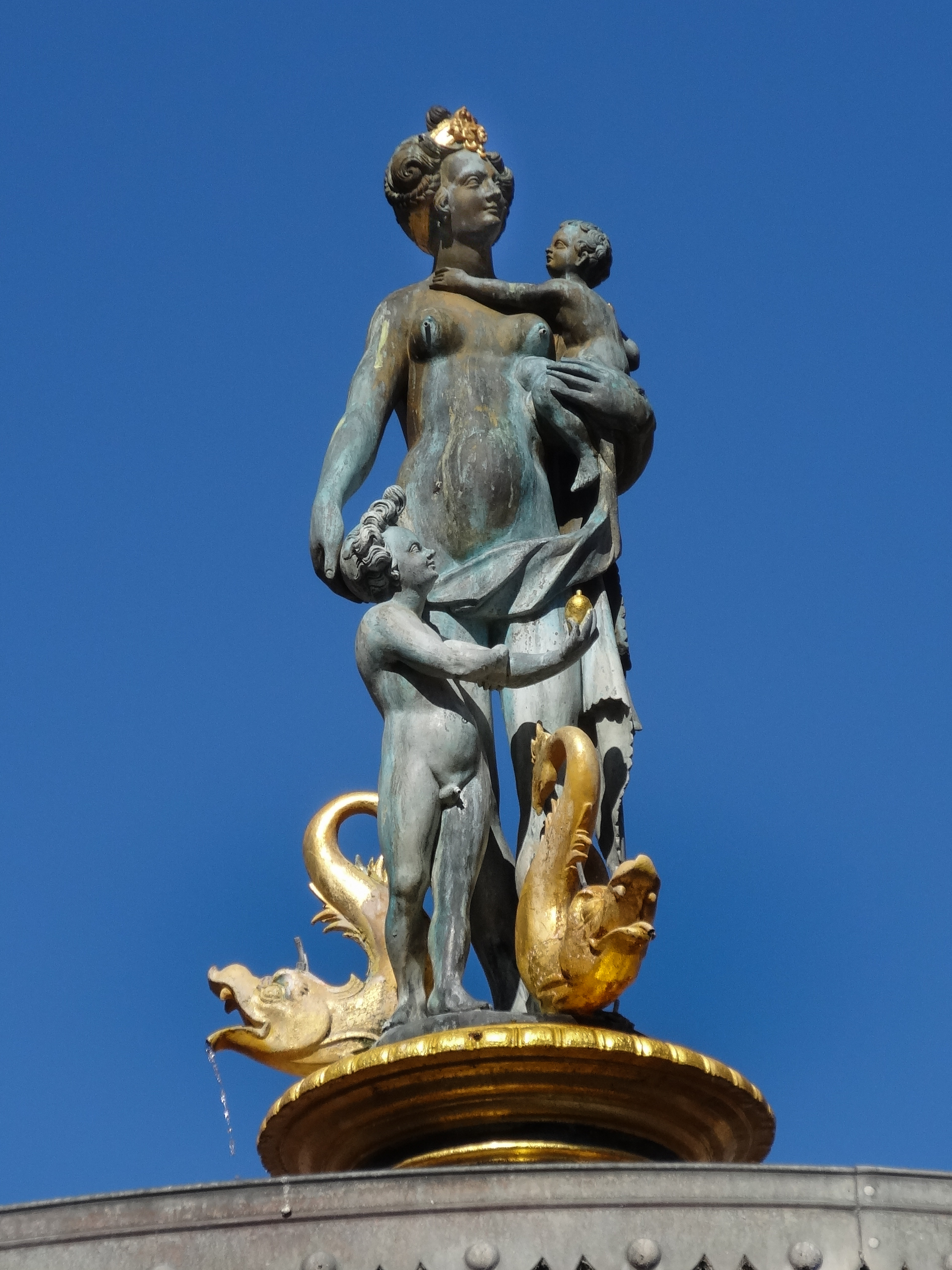
The Caritas figure

The figure group is originally carved in wood by the German wood carver Statius Otto in Elsinore for casts afterwards to be made in bronze. The figures depict the greatest of the three theological virtues, love or charity (caritas in Latin), symbolised by a pregnant mother with her children. The figures stand on a column in a copper basin. The copper basin is raised above a lower basin on a stone pillar. The female figure sprays water from her breasts while the little boy "pees" into the basin. From 1857 to 1940, these holes were sealed, out of deference to the sensibilities of the time.

== History ==
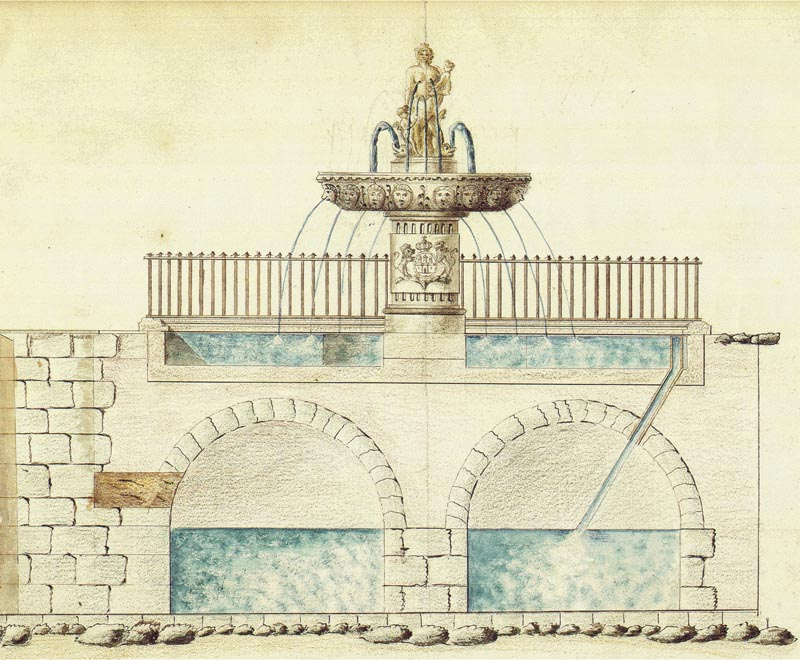
Drawing from the 1770s commissioned by mayor Hans Christopher Hersleb

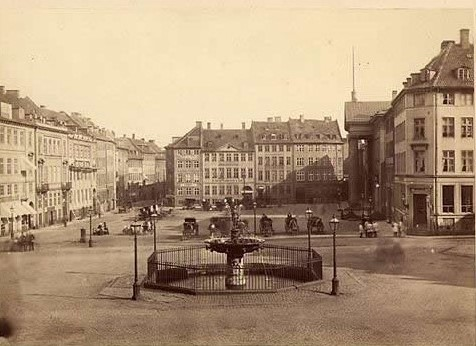
The Caritas Fountain in 1860

The Caritas Well is a result of a relocation and modernization of an older fountain erected by Frederik II. He provided for the construction of a six km water tube from Lake Emdrup north of the city to Gammel Torv. The altitude difference being 9 metres, the water pressure was adequate for a fountain to be constructed. Though ornamental in character, the well was also part of the city's water supply system.

== The Golden Apples ==
On the monarch's birthday (currently 16 April for Queen Margrethe II), copper balls covered in 24 carat gold, symbolising golden apples, are placed in the fountain, to balance on the streams. The tradition goes back to the 18th century.

== See also ==
- Gefion Fountain
- Stork Fountain
