= Søren Kierkegaard as Philosopher =

1986 book by Harald Høffding

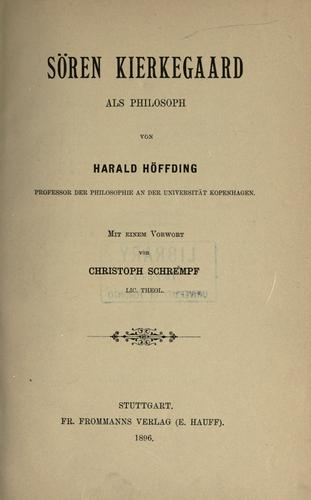
- Book title to Søren Kierkegaard as Philosopher
- Author: Harald Høffding
- Original title: Sören Kierkegaard als Philosoph
- Language: German
- Subject: Philosophy
- Publisher: Stuttgart F. Frommann
- Publication date: 1896
- Publication place: Germany
- Media type: Print (Hardback)

Søren Kierkegaard as Philosopher (German: Sören Kierkegaard als Philosoph) is an 1896 book about Søren Kierkegaard by philosopher Harald Høffding. Its publication marked a significant turning-point in German philosophy, which formally introduced and disseminated Kierkegaard's philosophy to Germany and the rest of Continental Europe by the beginning of the 20th century. Søren Kierkegaard as Philosopher was one of the first German studies of Kierkegaard to treat him as a coherent philosopher and theologian, and raised questions that became central to Kierkegaard studies and to German lebensphilosophie generally.
