= Alexandrahus =

Building in Copenhagenm Denmark

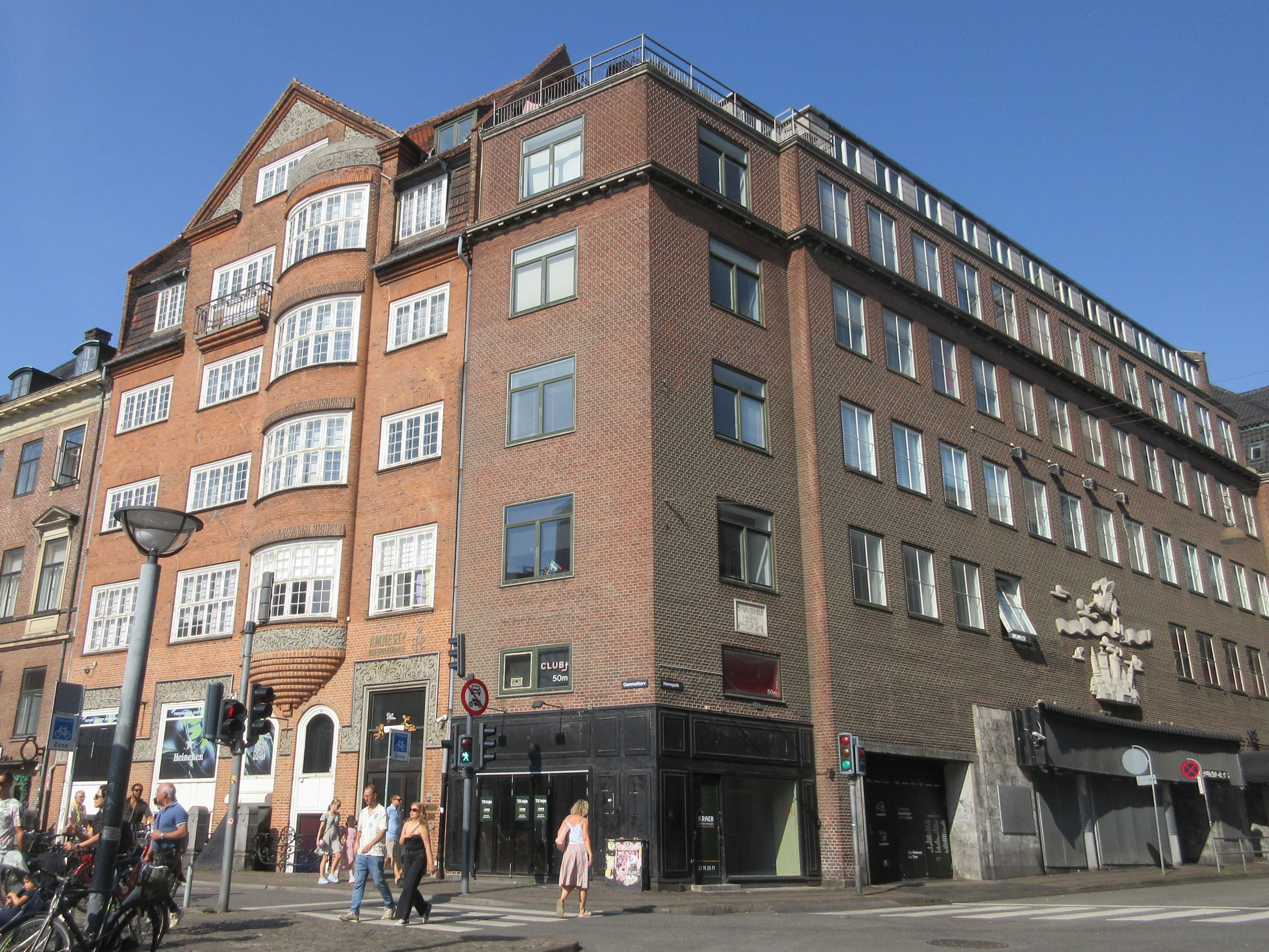
- Interactive map of the Alexandrahus area

General information
- Location: Copenhagen, Denmark
- Coordinates: 55°40′42.38″N 12°34′19.7″E
- Completed: 1942

Alexandrahus is a building complex situated at the corner of Nørregade (No. 1) and Gammeltorv (No. 8) in central Copenhagen, Denmark. The cinema Alexandra-Biografen was operated on the site from 5 December 1942 to 23 December 1981, A plaque on the facade commemorates the philosopher Harald Høffding, who was born on the site. The previous building on the site was known as the Høfding House (Danish: Høfdings Gård) and belonged to his father, Niels Frederik Høffding.

== Architecture ==
The corner building was designed by Ernst Kühn (1890–1948). It is a five-storey building constructed in red brick with extruded joints, with a 14-bay long facade on Nørregade and a just one-bay-long facade towards the square. The bay closest to the corner stands out from the rest of the facade towards the street, both by being wider than the other bays and by being slightly recessed from the rest of the facade. The fifth floor is separated from the lower floors by a dentillated cornice. The most distinctive feature of the Nørregade facade is a relief composition by Olaf Stæhr-Nielsen above the main entrance. It features a composition of Copenhagen's most iconic towers as well as a pegasus, a film strip, an owl, a half moon and clouds. Close to the corner is a plaque which commemorates that Harald Høffding was born on the site.

== Gallery ==
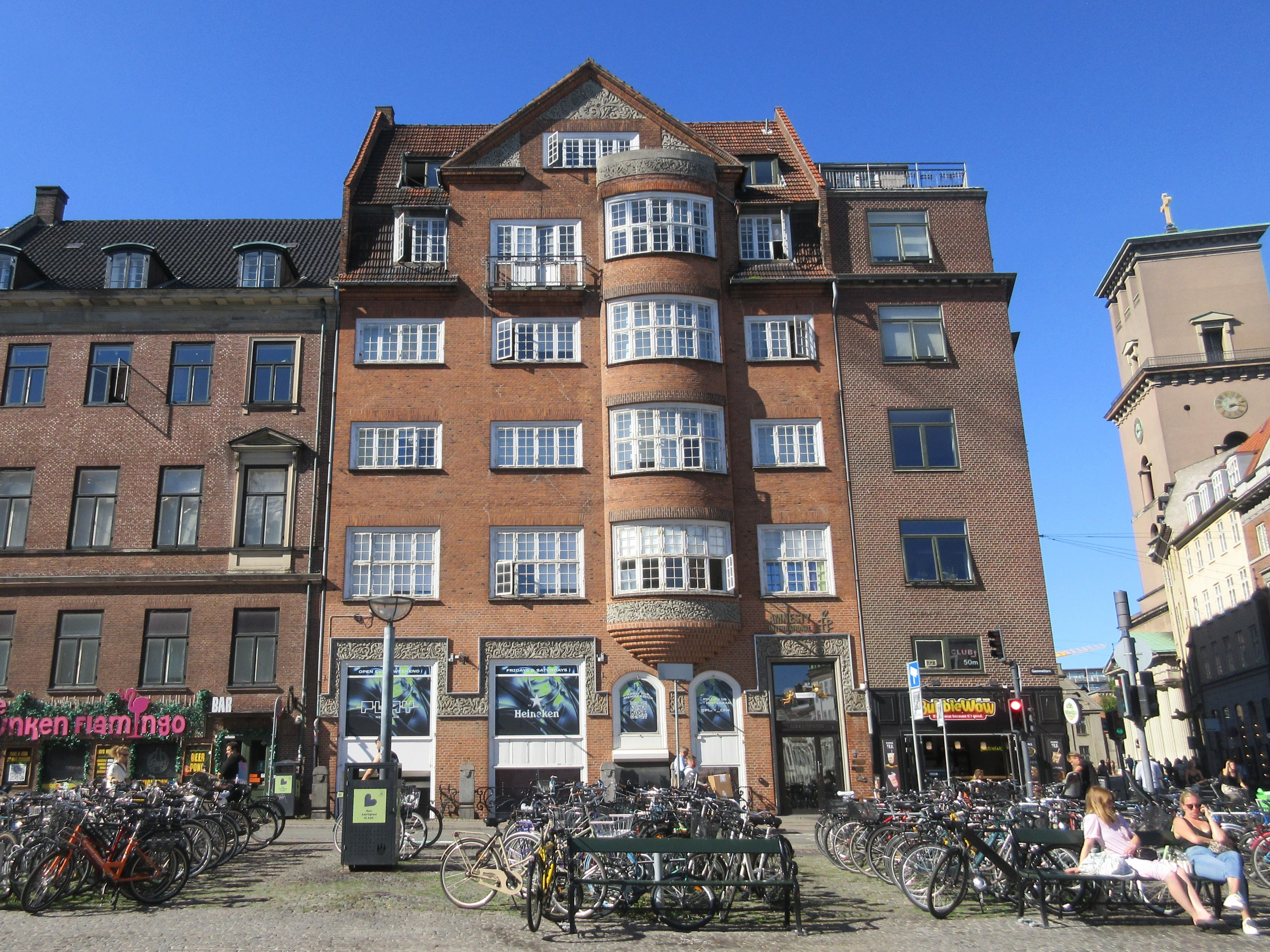
The building complex ciewed from Gammeltorv

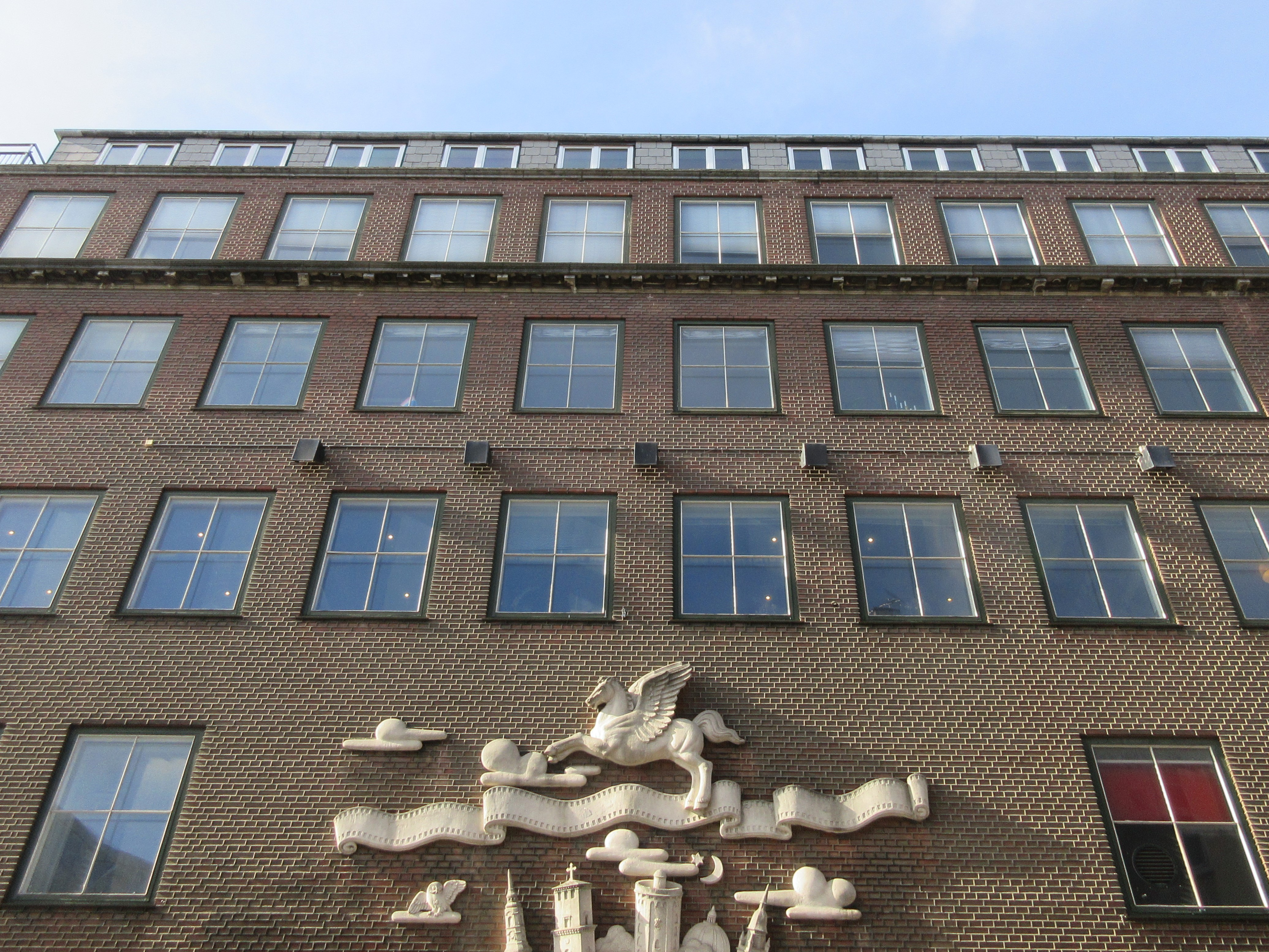
The facade on Nørregade

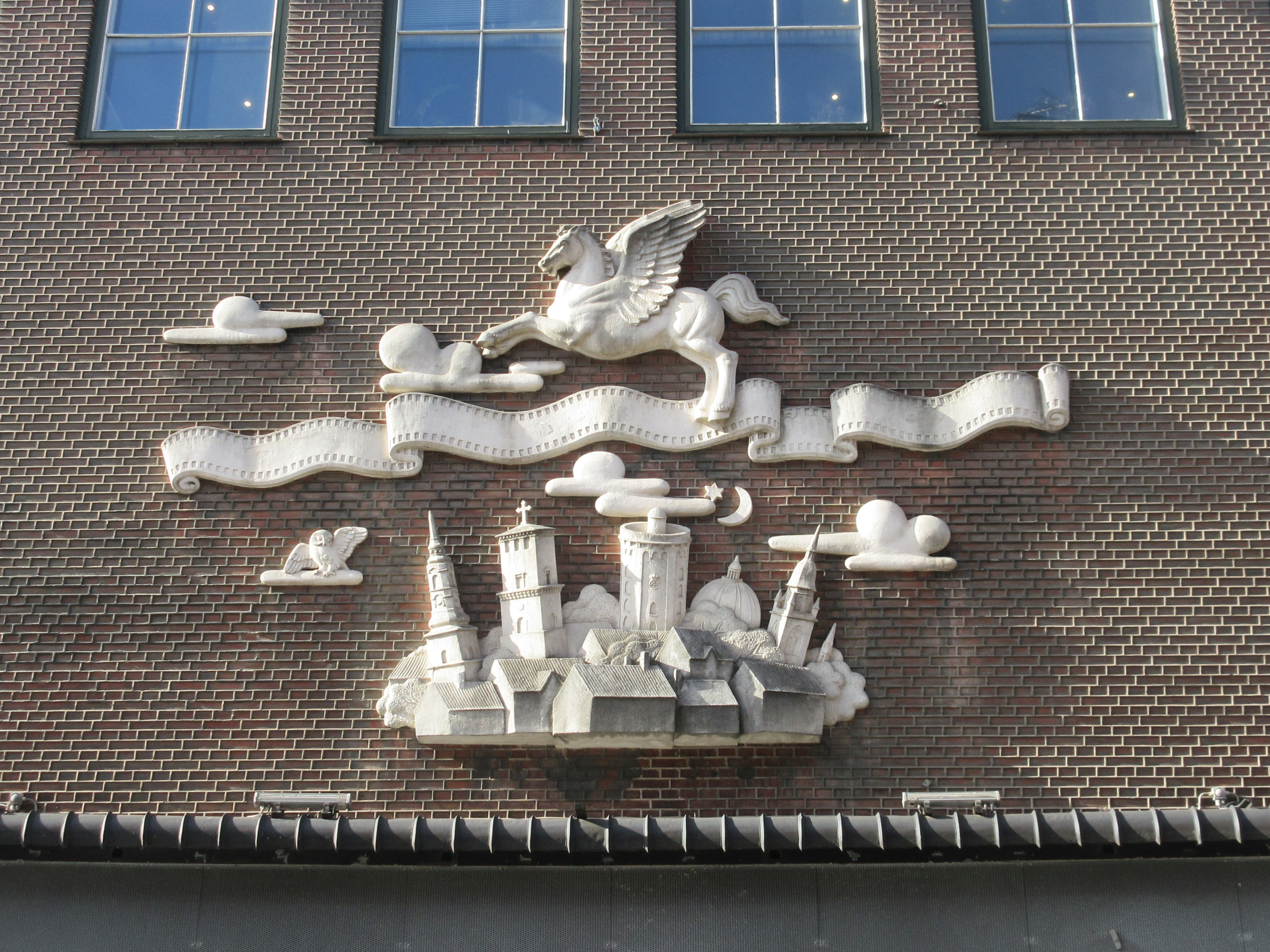
Facade detail

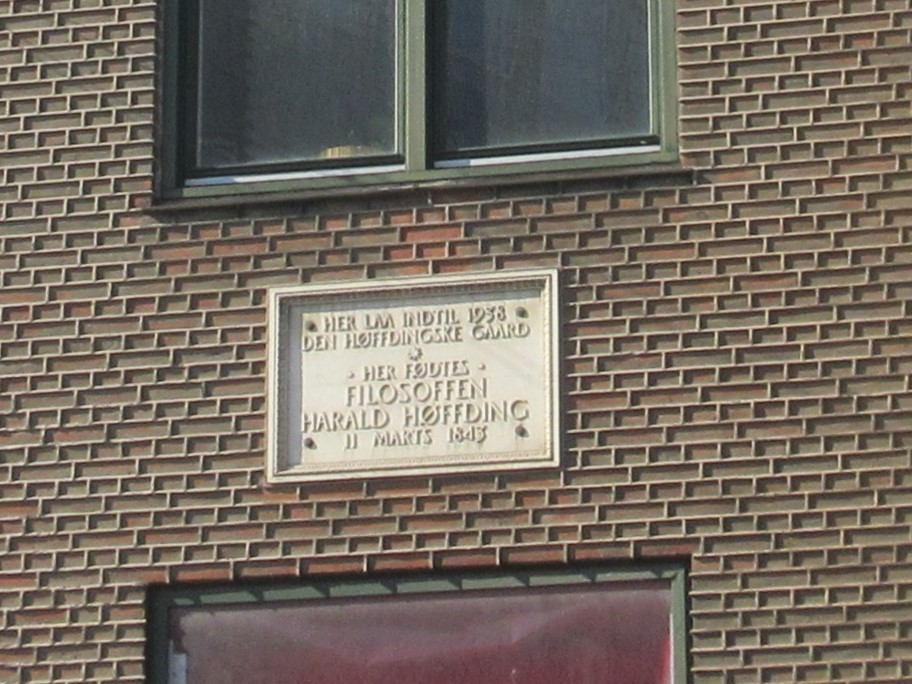
The commemorative plaque
