= Stelling House =

Building in Copenhagen

- Stellings Hus
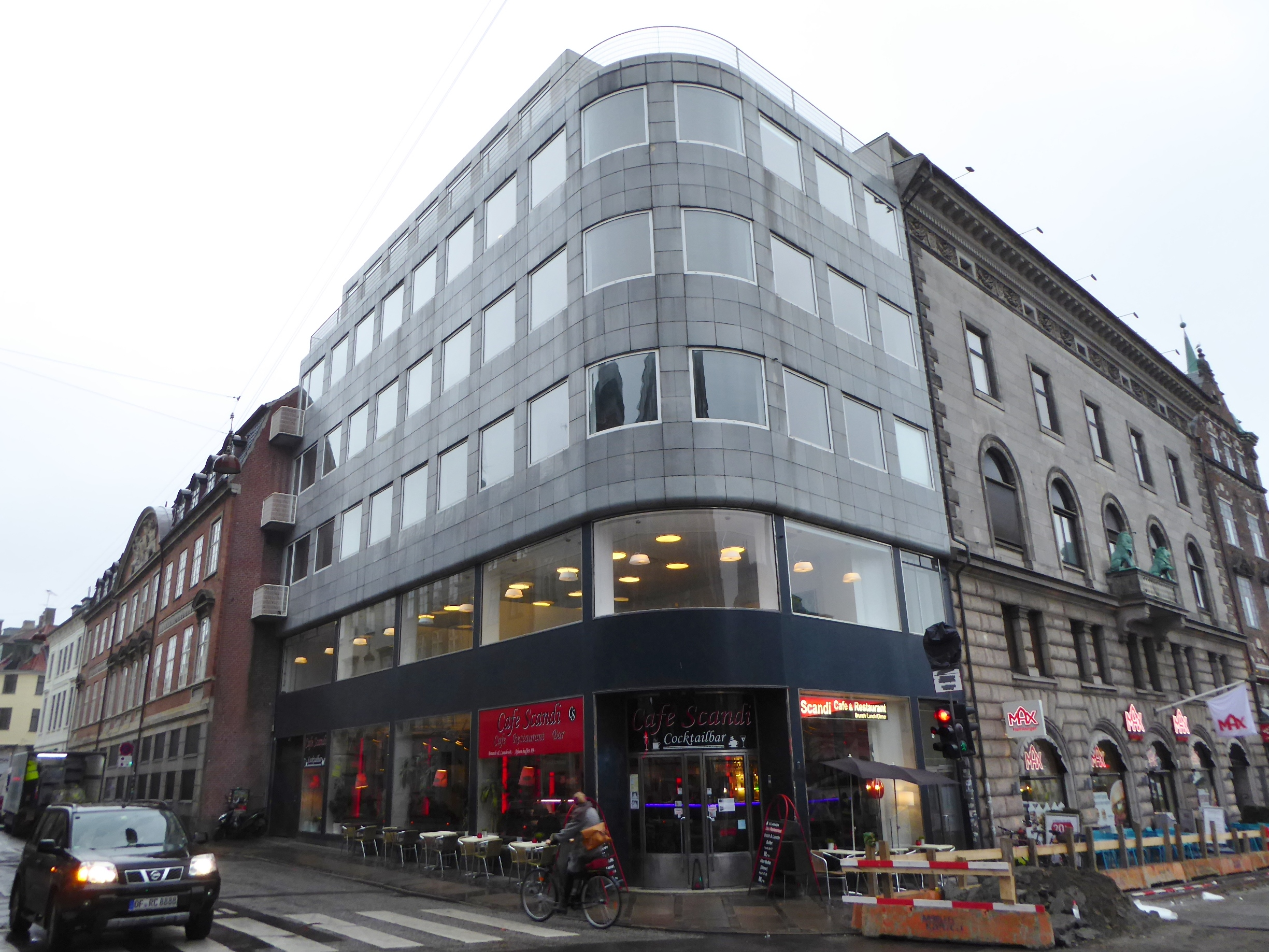
- Interactive map of the Stelling House area

General information
- Location: Copenhagen, Denmark
- Coordinates: 55°40′43″N 12°34′21″E
- Completed: 1937

Design and construction
- Architect: Arne Jacobsen

Stelling House (Danish: Stellings Hus) is a building on Gammeltorv in the centre of Copenhagen, Denmark. Completed in 1937, it was designed as an office building and retail store for the A. Stelling paint company by Arne Jacobsen, who took pains to have it blend in with the older buildings which surround it.

== History ==
=== Early history ===
The property was listed in Copenhagen's first cadastre of 1689 as No. 158 in Snaren's Quarter. It was at that time owned by Jacob Eskenberg. It was listed as No. 142 and was at that time owned by wine merchant (vintapper) Bendix Petersen.

A distillery was later established on the site by the Petersen family. The property was home to 18 residents in three households at the 1801 census. Jes Petersen, a distiller, resided in the building with his wife Karen Maria Hyllested, the wife's 14-year-old son Simon Meisling (from her first marriage, later known as Gans Christian Andersen's principal), Petersen's brother Hans Petersen, two male servants and one maid. Friderich Jacobsen Laann (1733-1802), a lawyer, resided in the building with his wife Nicoline Jacobsen, two of their children (aged 18 and 25) and one maid. Poul Nicolai Christensen, a beer seller (øltapper), resided in the building with his wife Abiel Berthelsen, their three children (aged one to four) and one maid.

The property was home to 13 residents at the time of the 1840 census. Niss Hansen, a new distiller, resided on the ground floor with his wife Anne Magrete (née Galhchøt?), two maids and one lodger. Christense Ulrikka Steenberg (1767-1851), the 34-year-old widow of broker Christian Vilhelm Steenberg, resided on the second floor with her seven-year-old daughter, Christiane Vilhelmine Steenberg, and one maid. Christen Hansen, a merchant (spækhøker), resided in the basement with his wife Hedvi Sophie Hansen, their two sins (aged five and 11) and one maid.

The property was home to 21 residents in five households at the 1860 census.

Carl Hansen, a former retailer, resided on the ground floor with his wife, Necoline Hansen, and one maid. Ane Magrethe Hansen, a 50-year-old widow, resided on the first floor with her 30-year-old daughter, Gyda Marie Hansen. Jacobine Müller, widow of a justitsråd, resided on the second floor with her daughter, Clara Sørina, and the 30-year-old visitor, Sophie Anker. Johan Heinrich Albrecht Scherfig, a former master baker, resided on the third floor with his wife Pauline Scherfig and their nine children (aged one to 16). Jens Petersen's property was listed as No. 99 in the new cadastre of 1806. Christen Hansen, a cattle trader, resided in the basement with his wife Hedevig Sophie Hansen.

=== A. Stelling ===
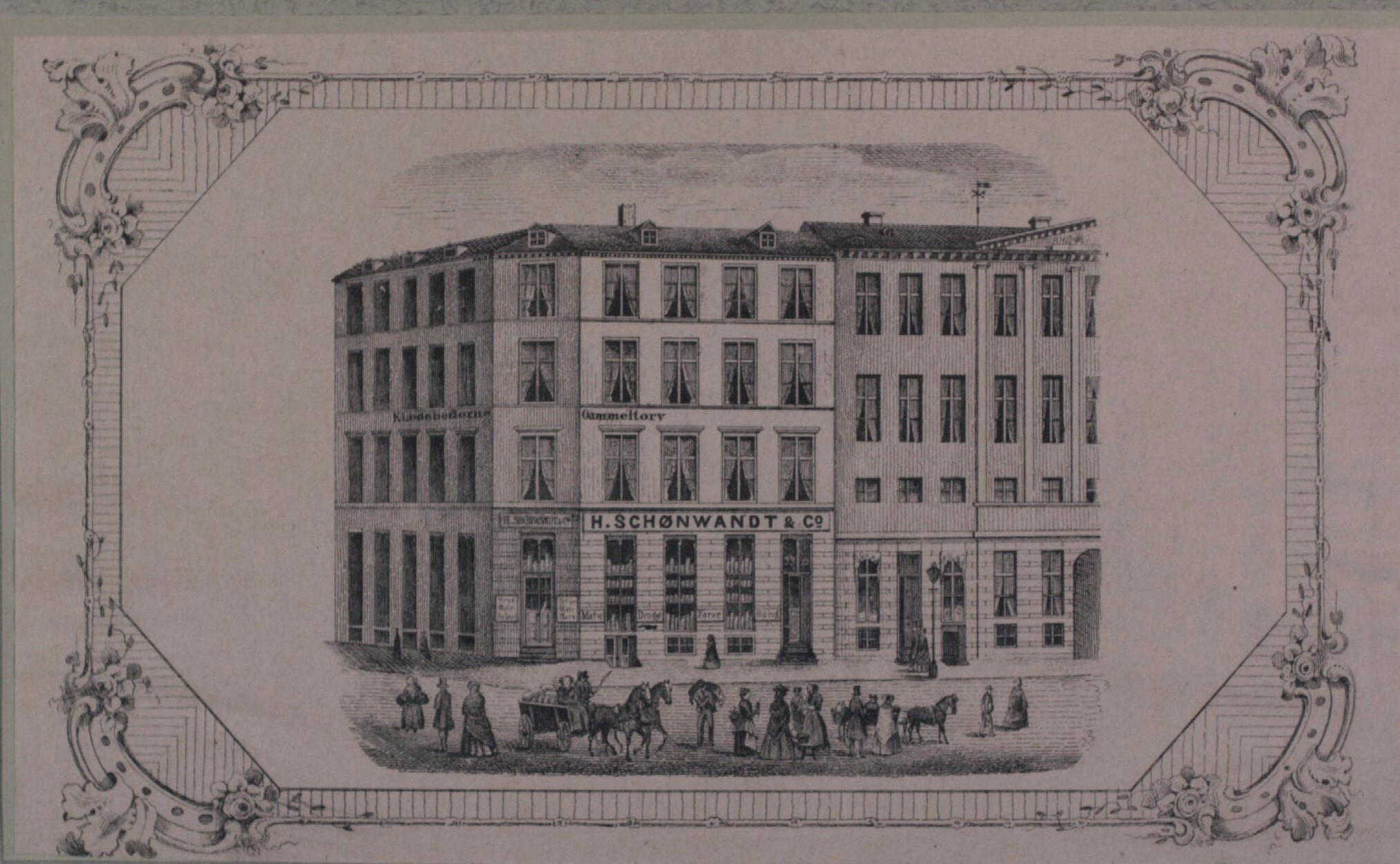
Advert for H. Schønwandt & Co, at Gammeltorv 6

In 1860, H. Schönwandt (b. 1862) opened a paint shop on the ground floor. After the founder's death, the property were associated company was sold to Anton Stelling (1836-1912). In 1900, Anton's sons, Walter (1869-1935) and Erwin (1870-1923) joined the company as partners. The same year, F.E. van der Aa Kühle's Lacquer Factory in Valby was acquired by the company.

In the 1930s, A, Stelling charged Arne Jacobsen with the design of a new building for their old property on Gammeltorv. It was completed in 1947.

=== Gangsted-Rasmussen family, 1860–present ===
In 1970 the building was acquired by Supreme Court attorney Ole Gangsted-Rasmussen. In 1984, he sold it to his son Niels Gangsted-Rasmussen.

McGrails Naturmagasin was located on the ground floor in the early 2000s. It moved in conjunction with a major refurbishment of the building. Café Stelling occupied the ground floor from 2003 to 2007. It was replaced by Oonaco, another restaurant and café concept furnished with tables and chairs designed by Arne Jacobsen.

== Architecture ==
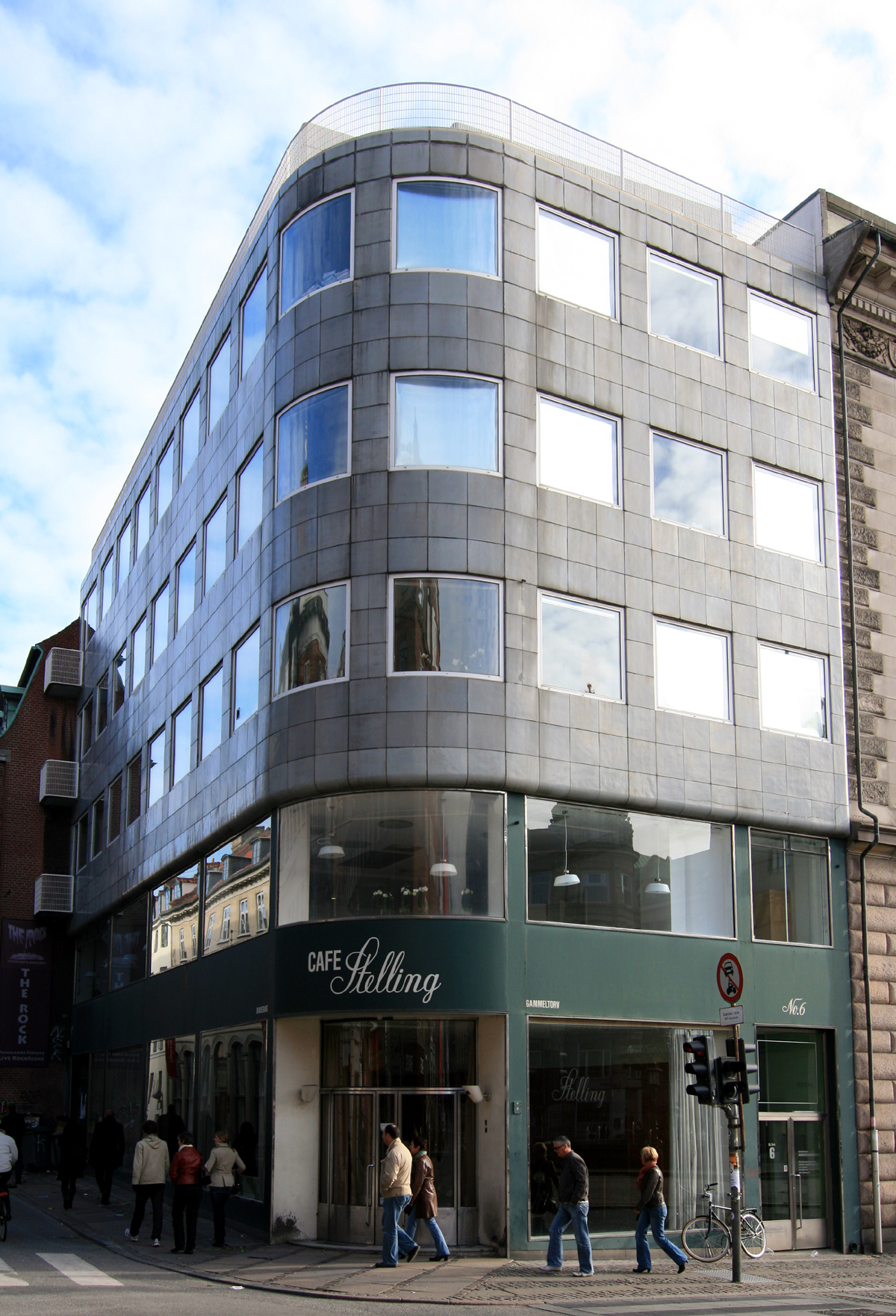
Stelling House, Copenhagen

Towards the end of the 1930s, influenced in part by Gunnar Asplund, Jacobsen moved from the white-plastered functionalism of his Bellavista developments to a more Nordic modern approach. Indeed, built in a puritanically modernistic style, Stelling House complements the classicism of the surrounding buildings.

The reinforced concrete structure is six stories tall, the top floor being slightly set back. The two bottom stories are clad in green-painted steel plate while the upper part of the building is finished in grey tiling. Although the building does not appear to be out of place today, like his Aarhus City Hall it was openly criticized at the time, both for its general appearance and for the materials used. In 1991, it became a listed building.

== Literature ==
- Vibeke Andersson Møller, Stellings hus, 2003, Frederiksberg: Fisker, 122 p. (in Danish) ISBN 87-91078-18-0.
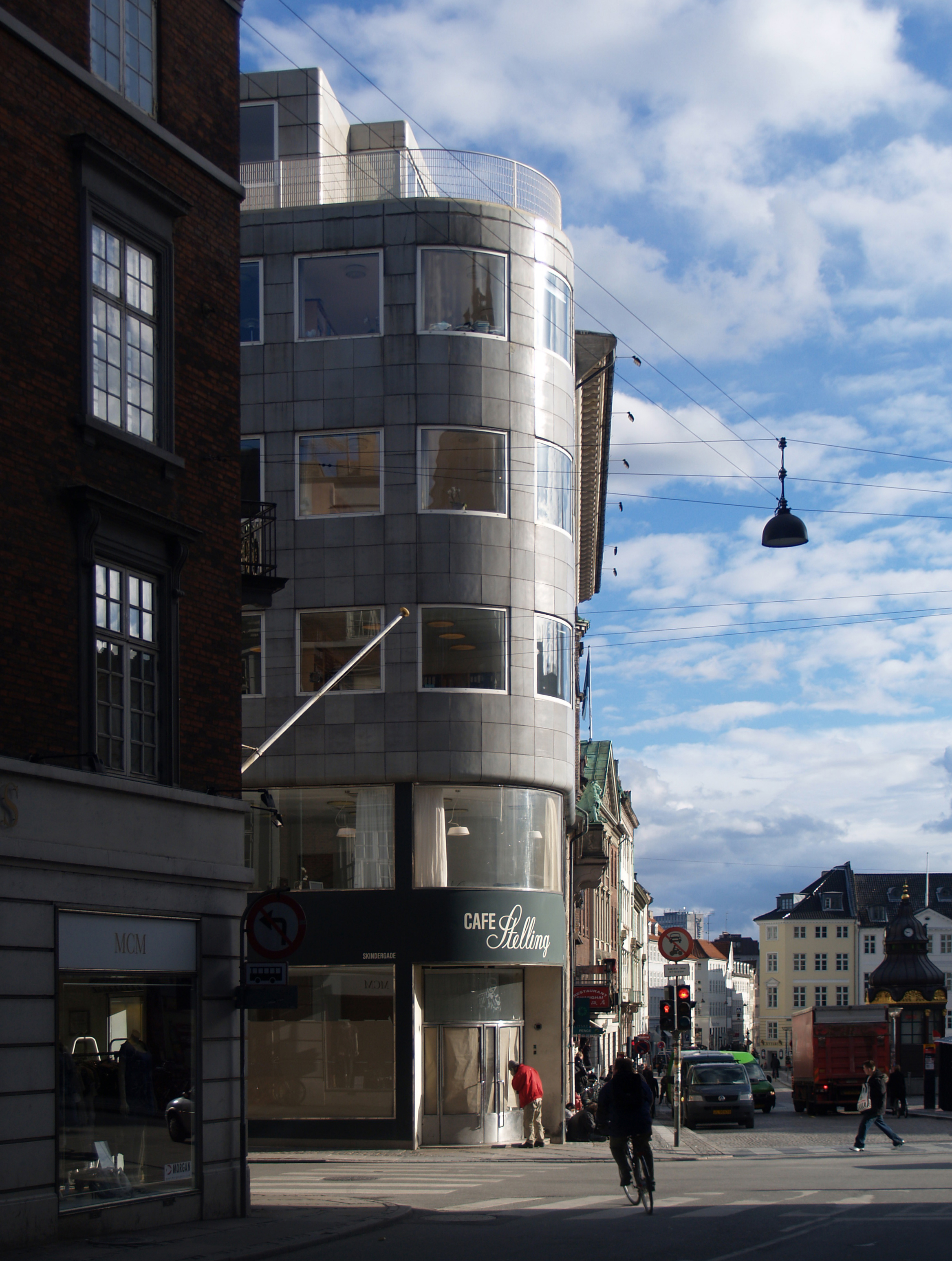

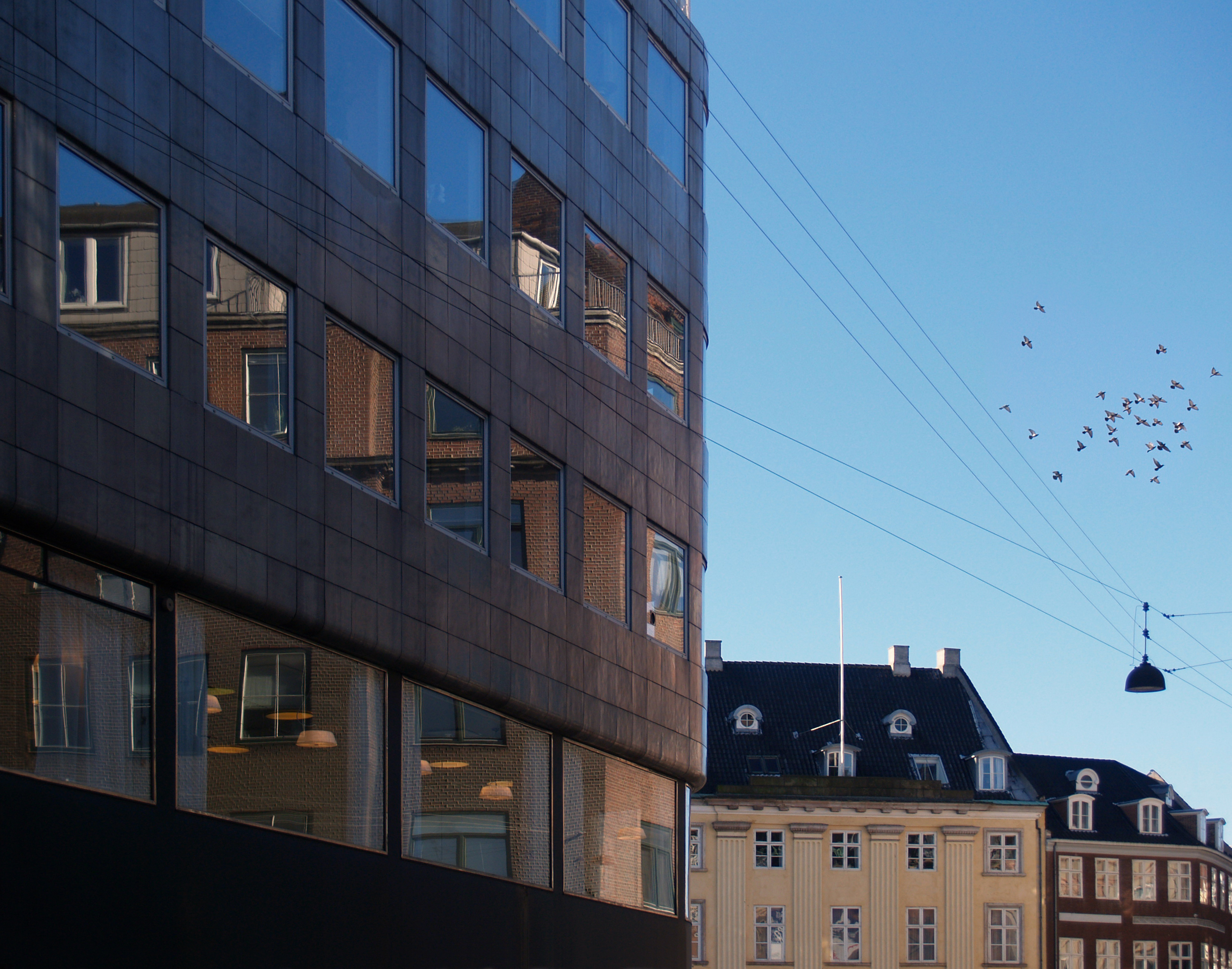

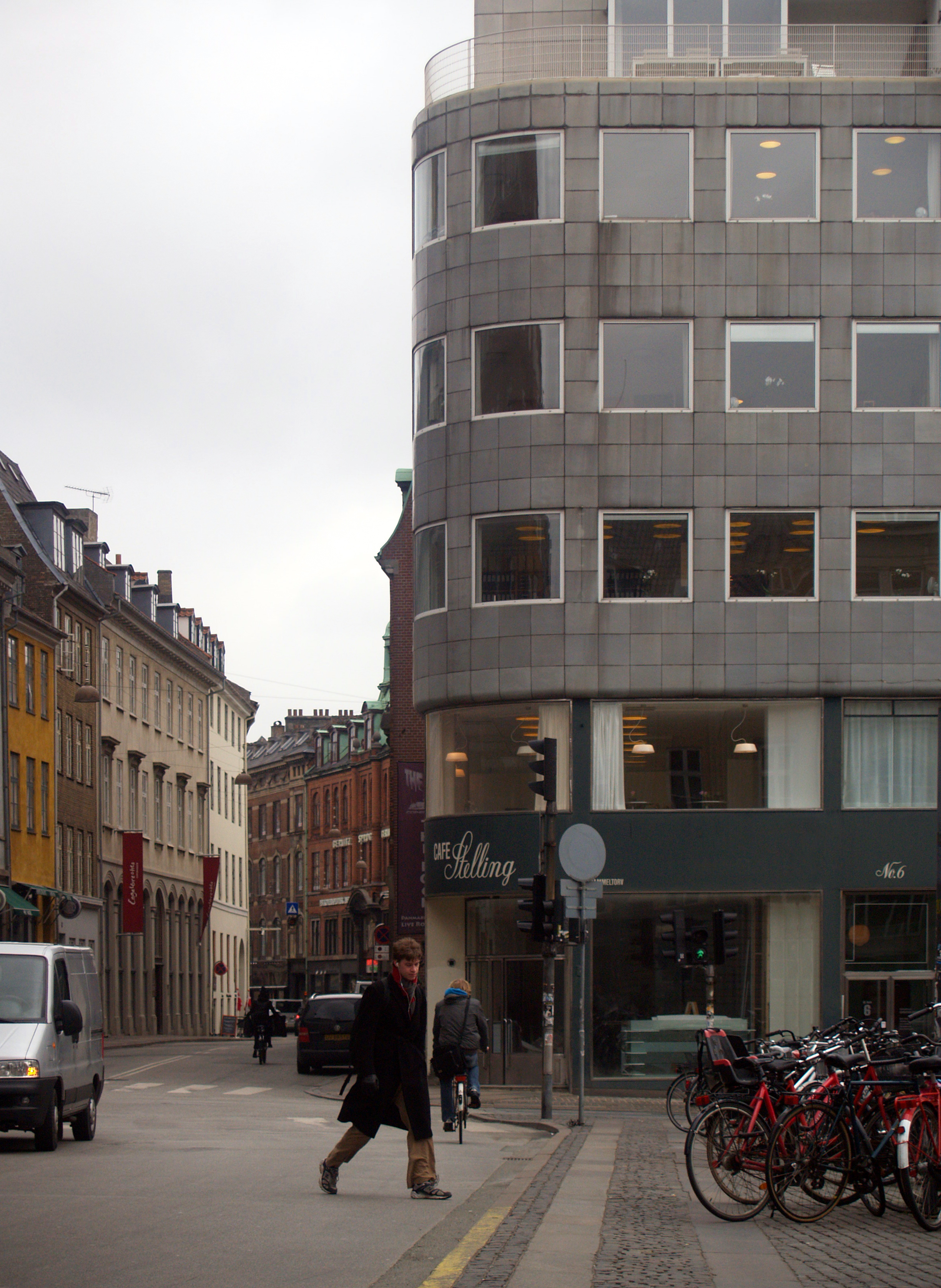

== See also ==
- Pressens Hus
