= Danish philosophy =

Part of Western philosophy

Danish philosophy has a long tradition as part of Western philosophy.

Perhaps the most influential Danish philosopher was Søren Kierkegaard, the creator of Christian existentialism, who inspired the philosophical movement of Existentialism. Kierkegaard had a few Danish followers, including Harald Høffding, who later in his life moved on to join the movement of positivism. Among Kierkegaard's other followers include Jean-Paul Sartre, who was impressed with Kierkegaard's views on the individual, and Rollo May, who helped create humanistic psychology. Danish philosophy was also strongly influenced by French hermeneutics philosopher Paul Ricœur.
