= Harald Høffding =

Danish philosopher and theologian (1843–1931)

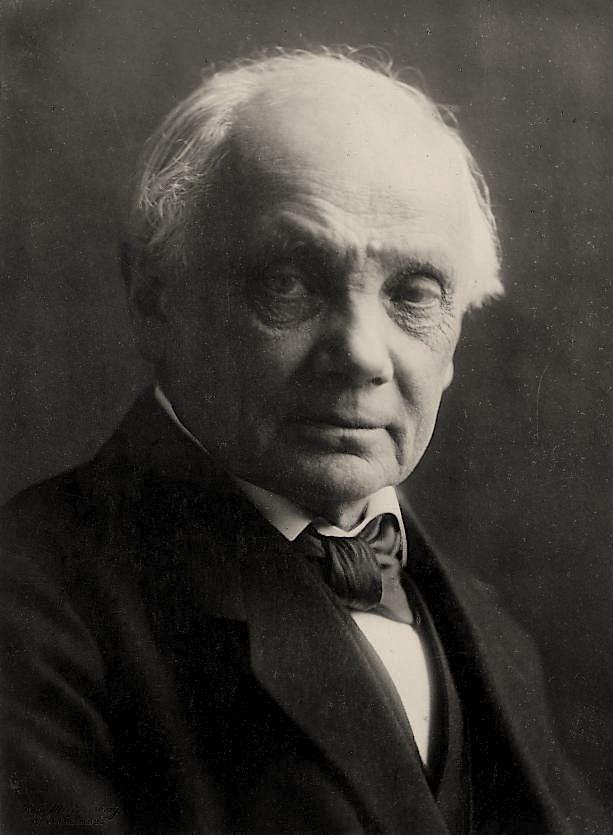
- Harald Høffding c. 1915
- Born: 11 March 1843; Copenhagen, Denmark
- Died: 2 July 1931 (aged 88); Copenhagen, Denmark

Philosophical work
- Era: 19th-century philosophy
- Region: Western philosophy Danish philosophy
- Main interests: Theology, psychology

Harald Høffding (11 March 1843 – 2 July 1931) was a Danish philosopher and theologian.

== Life ==
Born Høffding was born in Copenhagen, the son of businessman Niels Frederik Høffding and Martha Høffding (née Jhellerup). The family lived at the corner of Gammeltorv and Nørregade. Høffding became a schoolmaster, and ultimately in 1883 a professor at the University of Copenhagen. He was strongly influenced by Søren Kierkegaard in his early development, but later became a positivist, retaining and combining with it the spirit and method of practical psychology and the critical school. The physicist Niels Bohr studied philosophy from and became a friend of Høffding. The philosopher and author Ágúst H. Bjarnason was a student of Høffding.

Høffding's great-nephew was the statistician Wassily Hoeffding.

Høffding died in Copenhagen.

== Work ==
His best-known work is perhaps his Den nyere Filosofis Historie (1894), translated into English from the German edition (1895) by B.E. Meyer as History of Modern Philosophy (2 vols., 1900), a work intended by him to supplement and to correct that of Hans Brøchner to whom it is dedicated. His Psychology, the Problems of Philosophy (1905) and Philosophy of Religion (1906) also have appeared in English.

Among Høffding's other writings, most of which have been translated into German, are Den engelske Filosofi i vor Tid (1874); Etik (1876); Psychologi i Omrids paa Grundlag af Erfaring (ed. 1892); Psykologiske Undersøgelser (1889); Charles Darwin (1889); Kontinuiteten i Kants filosofiske Udviklingsgang (1893); Sören Kierkegaard als Philosoph (1896); Det psykologiske Grundlag for logiske Domme (1899); Rousseau und seine Philosophie (1901); Mindre Arbejder (1899).

== Commemoration ==
A commemorative plaque on the facade of Alexandrahus in Copenhagen (Nørregade 1) commemorates that Høffding was born on the site.

== Selected publications ==
- Harald Høffding, 1891 "Outlines of psychology". 1891.
- Harald Hoffding, 1906 "The Philosophy of Religion".
- Harald Høffding, 1919 "A brief history of modern philosophy".
- Harald Høffding, 1920 "Modern philosophers; lectures delivered at the University of Copenhagen during the autumn of 1902, and lectures on Bergson, delivered in 1913".
