= Assessor Bachmann House =

Building in Copenhagen

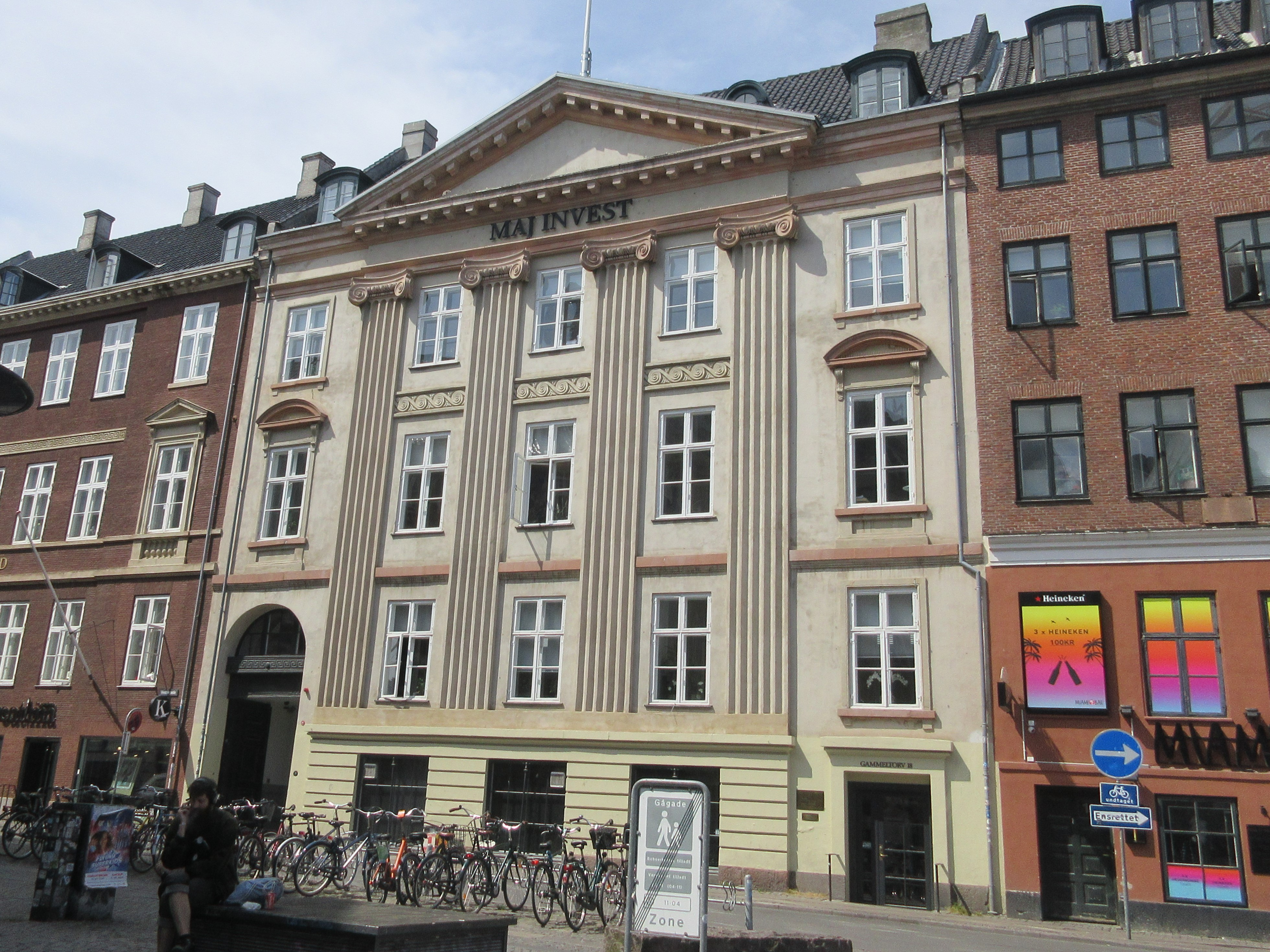
- Interactive map of the Assessor Bachmann House area

General information
- Location: Copenhagen, Denmark
- Coordinates: 55°40′41.62″N 12°34′17.25″E
- Construction started: 1796
- Completed: 1797
- Client: C. Fr. Bachmann

The Assessor Bachmann House (Danish: Assessor Bachmanns Gård) is a historic property located at Gammeltorv 18 in the Old Town of Copenhagen, Denmark. It houses the private equity fund Maj Invest.

== History ==
=== Early history ===
The property was listed in Copenhagen's first cadastre from 1689 as No. 7 in Northern Quarter, owned by Hans Knudsen Viborg.

=== Beckman family ===
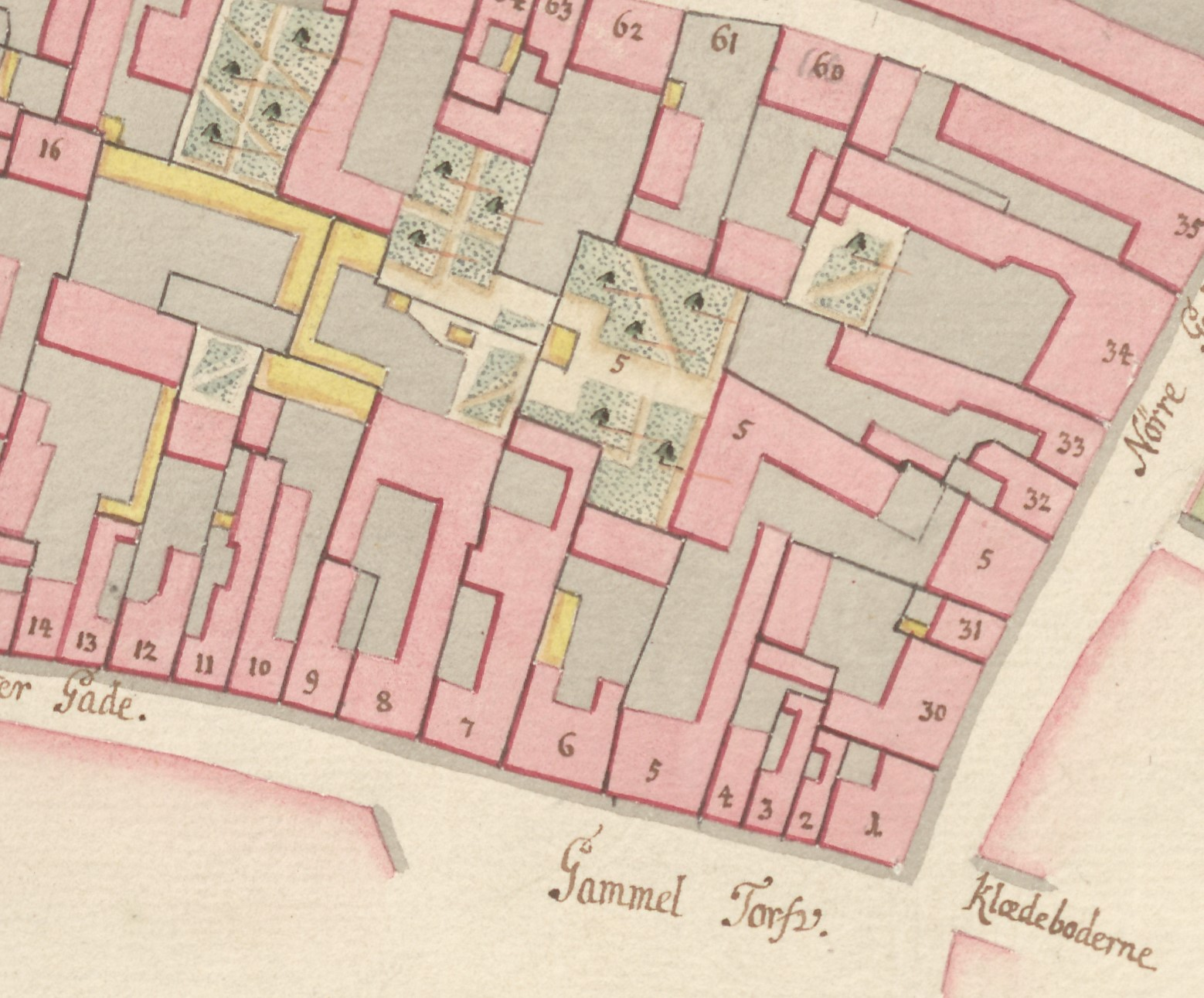
No. 5 seen on a detail from Gedde's district map of Northern Quarter, 1757.

In the new cadastre of 1756, it was again listed as No. 7 in Northern Quarter. It belonged to brewer Diderich Bichmann at that time.

The property was later acquired by Didrich Barthold Beckman. On 12 October 1749, he was granted citizenship as a brewer in Copenhagen. He was the son of merchant Didrich Barthold Beckman (1678-1751) and Anna Maria Konnemann (1683-1761). On 19 November 1749m he was married to Ellen Pauli /1728-), In 1761-1765, he served as overformynder in Copenhagen. On 9 March 1763, he was elected as one of Copenhagen's 32 Men. In 1776, he became a councilman. (Rådmand). In 1767-1776, he served as one of the directors of Kjøbenhavns Brandforsikring (Copenhagen Fire Insurance).

Beckman's eldest son of the same name served as cashier for Søassurance-Kompagniet. The daughter Anna married to secretary of Generalpostamtet Christian Diderik Lange. The daughter Elisabeth married bank manager Tasmys Kirketerp. The daughter Susanne married customs officer at Øresund Costum House Jacob Henrich Schou. The daughter Dorothea married the businessman Ole Bernt Suhr, who owned the Suhr House on the other side of the street.

The younger of the two sons, Poul Frederik Beckman (1751-1800), was still living with his parents after his brother and sisters had all moved. In 1793, he was appointed as a judge in Hof- og Stadsretten.

At the 1787 census, Beckman's property was home to 22 residents in three households. Beckman resided in the building with his wife Ellen (née Pauly), their son Povel Friderich Beckman, 13-year-old Sopia Amalia Berner, two maids, a brewer (employee), a brewer's assistant, a female cook a coachman and a caretaker. Hendrich Nicolay Schnauer resided in the building with his two sisters (Susanna and Elisabeth) and one maid. Hans Pedersen Krog, a cellarman, resided in the building with his wife Johanna Marie Lars Datter, their four children (aged two to eight) and one maid.

Beckman died on 10 June 1790. His wife died on 29 June 1820. After Beckman's death, his property was passed to Poul Frederik Beckman (1751-1800). He was not long thereafter married to Anna Dorothea Debes, a daughter of Supreme Court attorney Lucas Debes and Christiane Debes, They had three daughters. The eldest daughter Christine Beckman (1793-1836) was Johannes Dorph /1788-1873). The daughter Ellen Pauline Beckman (1798-1854) married Anton Henrik Dorph (1786-1860). The daughter Carine (Karine) Lucie Beckman (1800-1820) died just 20 years old in 1820.

Beckman's orioerty was destroyed in the Copenhagen Fire of 1795, together with most of the other buildings in the area. The present building on the site was built for him in 1796–1797- The neighbouring building at No. 5 (now Gammeltorv was built for hum in 1800–1801.

Poul Frederik Veckmann died on 2 June 1800. His widow sold the property shortly after his death. She was later married to Poul Abraham Dall (1873-1820). They had the sons Lucas Dall (1806-1855) and Christian Dall )19+0-1945)-

=== 1800–1840 ===
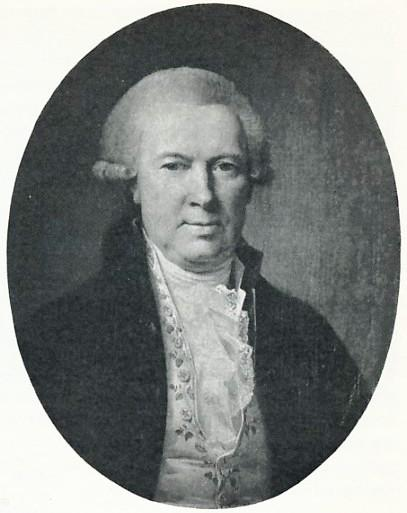
Georg Frederik Ditlev Koës painted by Jens Juel.

The new owner of the property on Gammeltorv was Georg Ditlev Friderich Koes. Back in 1771, he had founded Tal-Lotteriet. In 1774, he had bought Antvorskov and several other estates on Southern Zealand. He had subsequently demolished Antvorskov's chapel and used the bricks for the construction of Falkensteen. The latter property was intended as a dower house for his wife. After her early death in 1792, he had sold all the estates. He had subsequently lived in rented premises at Gunderslevholm.

At the 1801 census, Koës's property was home to 40 residents in six households. Georg Ditlev Friderich Georg Koës resided on the ground floor with five of his children (aged six to 29), a housekeeper, a husjomfru, two male servants, a maid and a female cook. Anne Dorthe Beckmand resided in the building with her three children (aged one to eight), a male servant, a wet murse, a maid and a female cook. Holger Stampe, a kammerjunker, resided in the building with his wife Kirsten Kaas, their two children (aged four and seven), two maids, a nanny, a female cook, two male servants and a coachman. Peder Jensen Rold, a barkeeper, resided in the building with his wife Martha Maria Rold and one maid. Hans Pedersen Krog, another barkeeper, resided in the building with his wife Johanne Marie [Krog]. Conradt Friderichsen and Christopher Thortsen, two brewery workers, resided in another dwelling with the building's caretaker Hans Christian Jensen.

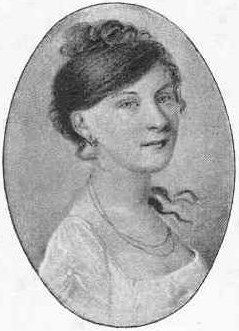
Marie Kooks (1790-1858)

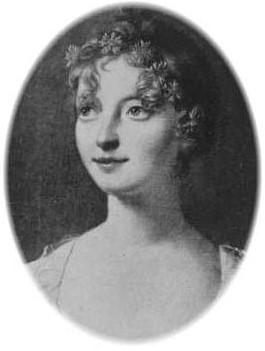
Frederikke Koës (1790-1818).

One of Koës's sons was the later philologist Georg Koës. He died on Zakynthos in 1811. His two twin sisters, Marie and Frederikke, were later married to Holger Aagaard and Peter Oluf Brøndsted.

The medical doctor and later vice mayor of Copenhagen Niels Bang and the naval officer Lorentz Fjelderup Lassen both lived in the building in 1802–03.

Koës's died i n 1804 In the new cadastre of 1806, the property was listed as No. 6 in Northern Quarter. It belonged to one Koss at that time.

Former bishop and professor of theology N. E. Balle (1744–1816) lived in the building from 1813 to 1816. In the 19th century, the rear wing housed an akvavit distillery.

=== Dahl and Ørsted, 1830s–1750s ===
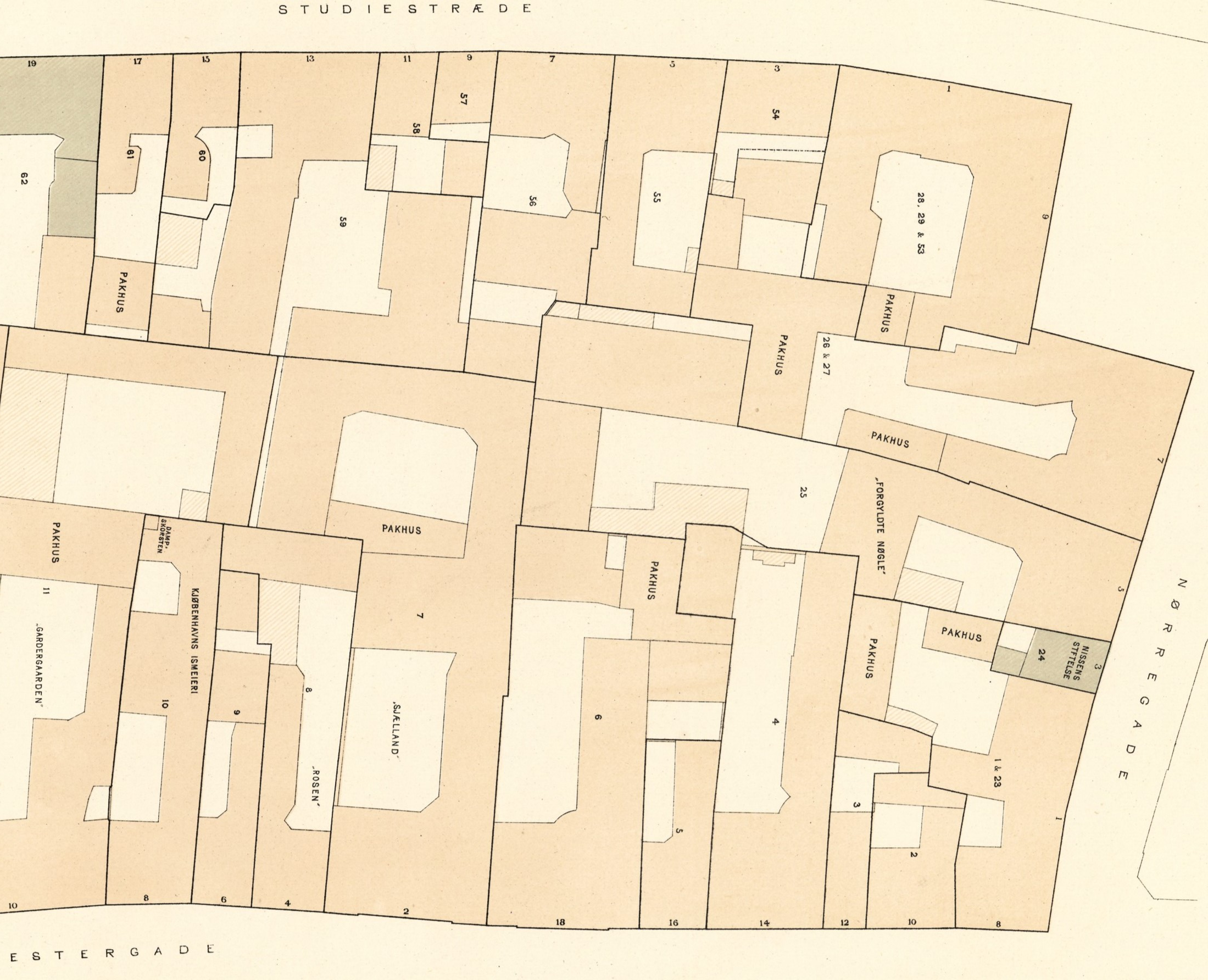
The property seen on a detail from one of Berggreen's black plans of Northern Quarter, 1886-88.

The politician Anders Sandøe Ørsted (1778–1860) lived in the building from 1837 to 1850.

The property was again home to 33 residents in six households at the 1840 census. Andreas Christian Raolovson, a councilman with title of justitsråd, resided on the ground floor with husjomfru Andrea Christiane Heibroch, one male servant and one maid. Anders Sandøe Ørsted resided on the first floor with his sons Anders and Sophus, the widow Vilhelmine Marie Rogert, husjomfru Elisabeth Kirstine Bohn, a servant and a maid. Vilhelm Burchard Dahl, a Landsraad samt Hof og Stadsrets lawyer, resided on the second floor with his wife Andrea Cevilie Marie Dahl, their three children (aged eight to 21), one male servant and two maids. Anders Larsen, a barkeeper, resided in the basement with his wife Ane Magrethe Povelsen, their three children (aged four to 15) and one maid. Jens Larsen. a man with means, resided on the first floor of the rear wing with his wife Ane Kirstine Larsen and a maid. Lars Nannestad, a clerk (kammerskriver) in Generaltoldkammeret, resided on the second and third floors of the rear wing with his wife Anna Nicoline Nannestad , two students (aged 20 and 22) and a maid.

The property was home to 39 residents in five households at the 1850 census. Vilhelm Burchard Dahl, who had now become a widoer, resided on the second floor with a male servant and two maids. Anders Sandøe Ørsted resided on the first floor with hus son, his daughter, the widow Wilhelmine Marie Rogert, a housekeeper, a male servant and a maid. Frederik Ludvig Frantz a'Auchamp, a lawyer, resided on the ground floor with his wife Frederikke d'Auchamps, their two children (aged seven and 14), one male servant and two maids. Hans Petersen, superintendent (torvemester, lit. market master) of the market on Gammeltorv, resided on the first floor of the rear wing with his wife Cathrine Hans Petersen and their six children (aged two to 12). Frederik Emil Petersen, a grocer (urtelræmmer), resided on the second floor of the rear wing with his wife Ottoline Petersen, their two children and one maid.

=== 1860 census ===
The property was home to six households at the 1860 census. Andreas Hansen Bjerre (1795-1864), a brewer and captain in the Student Corps, resided on the ground floor with three of his children (aged 15 to 30), a housekeeper and a maid. Samuel Jacob Ballin (1802-1868), a professor of medicine, resided on the first floor with his wife Dorthea Ballin (née Trier), two daughters (aged 20 and 23) and two maids. Frederik Ludvig Frantz d' Auchamp (1809-1872), a lawyer, resided on the second floor with his wife Frederikke *d'Auchampm their son Francois Louis d'Auchamp, one male servant and two maids. Anders Christensen, a grocer (køker), resided in the basement with his wife Nielsine Christine Christensen and one maid. Two servants and an apprentice, all associated one wine merchant Jensen, resided in another part of the basement. Marie Christine Høst, a widow, resided on the first floor of the rear wing with three unmarried children (aged 42 to 46). The youngest of them was the bookdealer and writer Alvild Theodor Høst (1818-1867). Karen Margrethe Jessen, another widow, resided on the second floor of the rear wing with her daughter Louise Wilhelmine Jessen, a maid and the lodger Wilhelm von Wickede. The daughter operated a private school service on the site. Bernhardt Otto Hansen, a wallpaperer, resided on the third floor of the rear wing with his wife Ingeborg Cecilia Christine Hansen, their three children (aged one to six), an apprentice and three lodgers.

=== 20th century ===
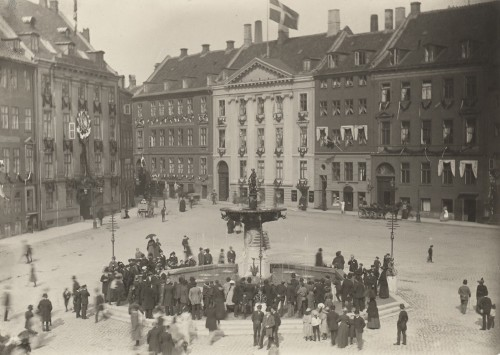
The house in 1892

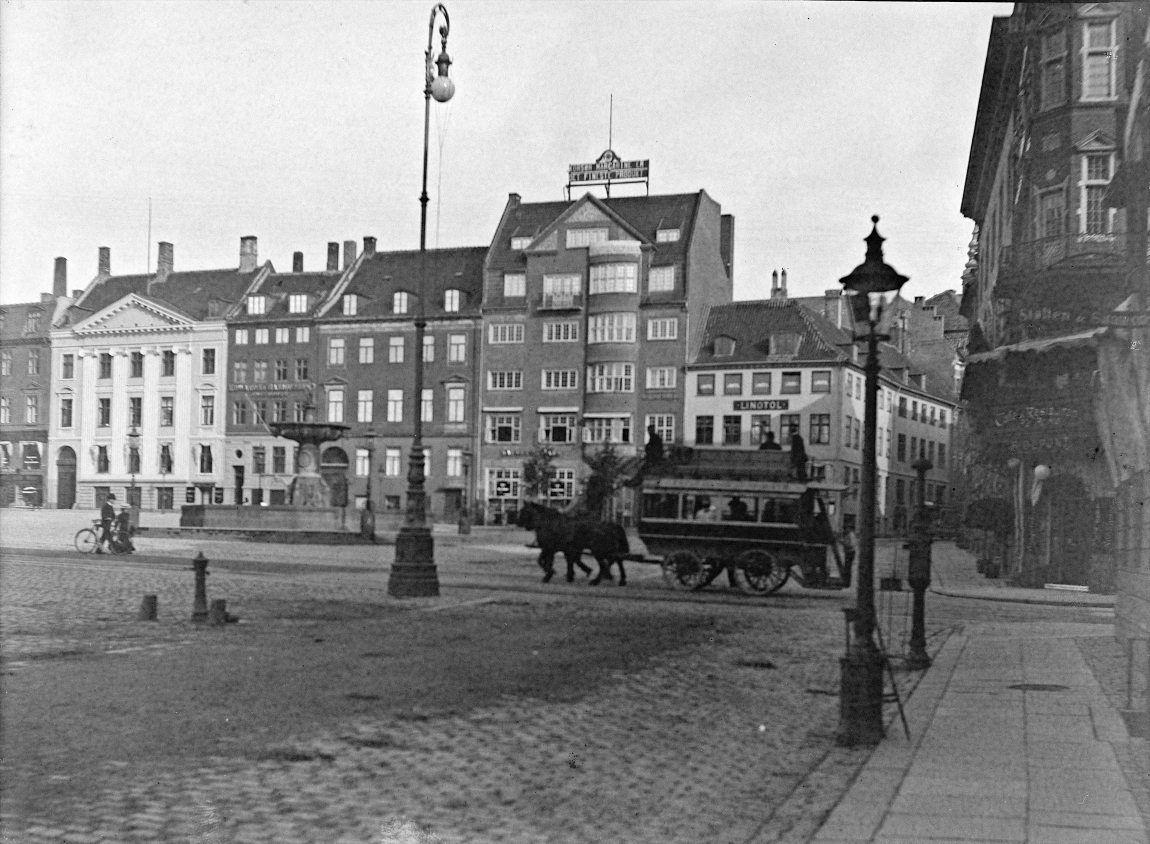
The building visible on a photograph from 1907

Brødrene Bendix acquired the building in 1917 and was based in the ground floor of the main building but the last private apartments did not disappear until the 1970s. Danske Vognmænds Arbejdsgiversammenslutning (now Dansk Transport of Logistik) purchased the building in 1975.

== Architecture ==
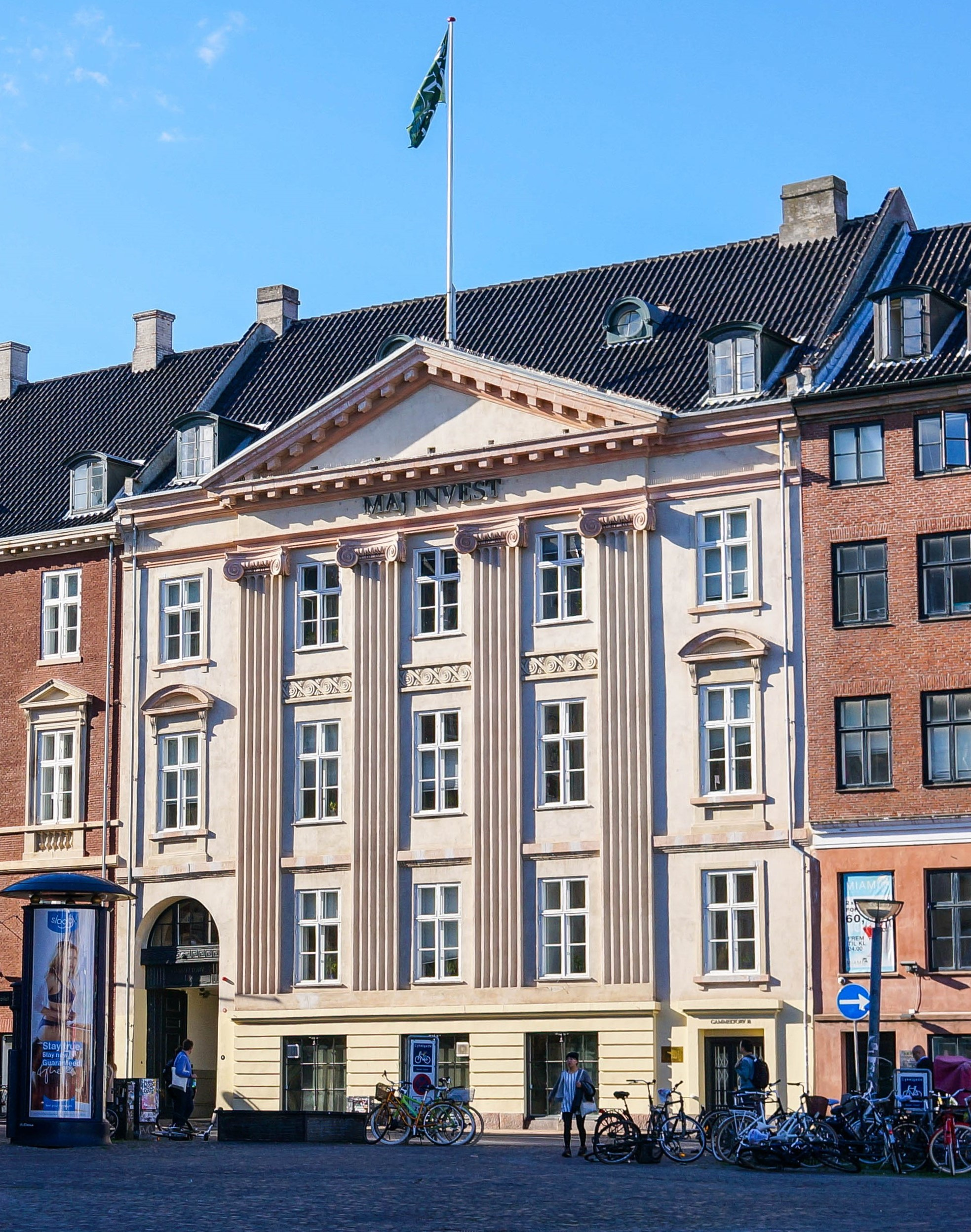
Gammeltorv 16

The building is designed in the Neoclassical style. The façade is decorated with Ionic order pilasters and a large triangular pediment. A gateway in the left side of the building opens to a long, narrow courtyard. The complex also comprises an 11-nay side wing and a five-bay rear wing at the bottom of the courtyard. It was listed in 1918.
