= Gammeltorv =

Square in Copenhagen, Denmark

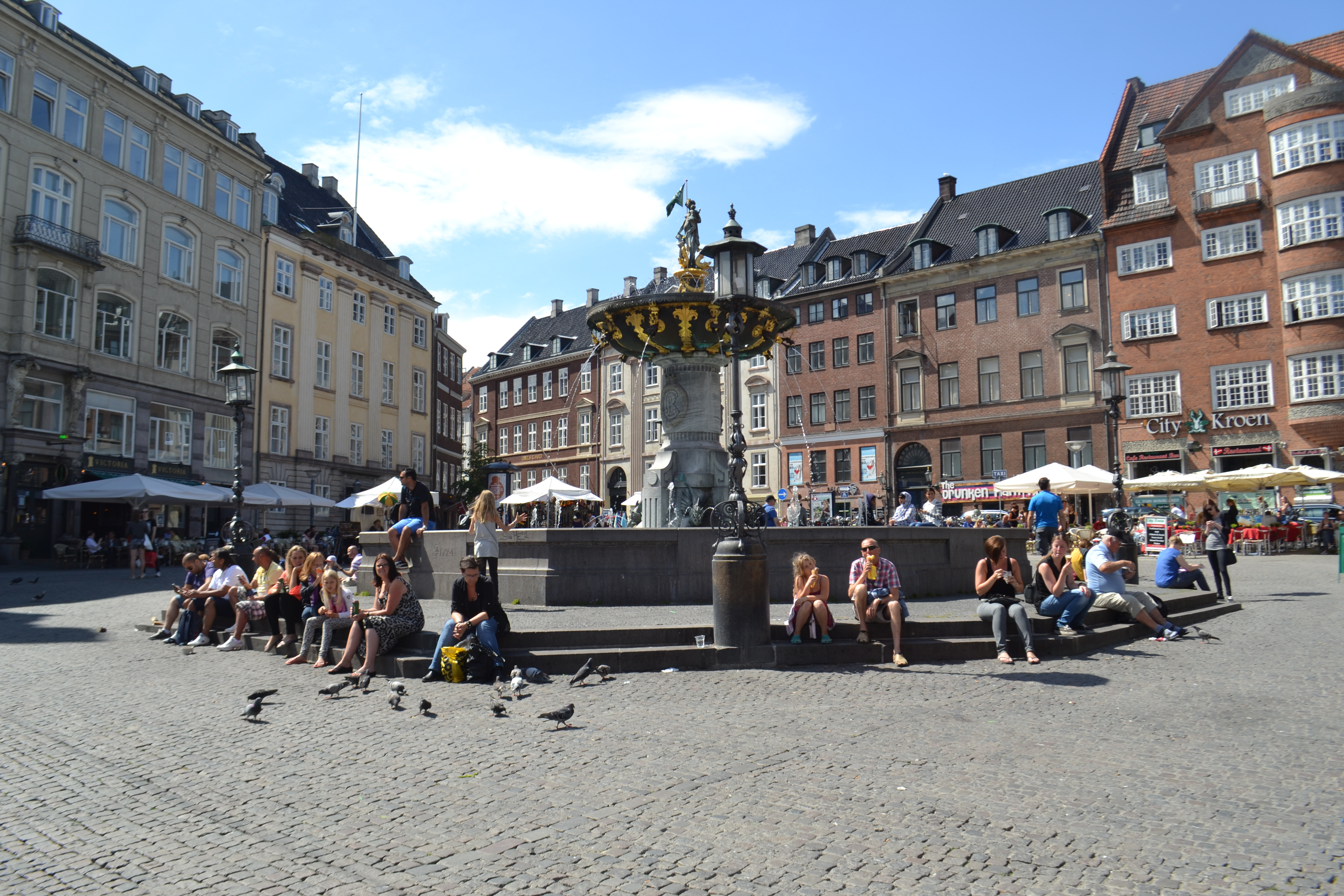
- Gammeltorv
- Interactive map of Gammeltorv
- Part of: Strøget
- Location: Indre By, Copenhagen, Denmark
- Postal code: 1457
- Coordinates: 55°40′41″N 12°34′20″E

Gammeltorv (Old Market) is the oldest square in Copenhagen, Denmark. With adjoining Nytorv it forms a common space along the Strøget pedestrian zone. While the square dates back to the foundation of the city in the 12th century, most of its buildings were constructed after the Great Fire of 1795 in Neoclassical style. Another dominating feature is the Caritas Well, a Renaissance fountain erected by King Christian IV in 1610.

Historically, Gammeltorv has been the focal point of Copenhagen's judicial and political life as well as one of its two principal marketplaces. Several former city halls have been located on the square or in its immediate vicinity. Surprisingly, its name is not a reference to adjoining Nytorv but to the slightly younger Amagertorv, Copenhagen's other major market in early times.

== History ==
=== Origins ===
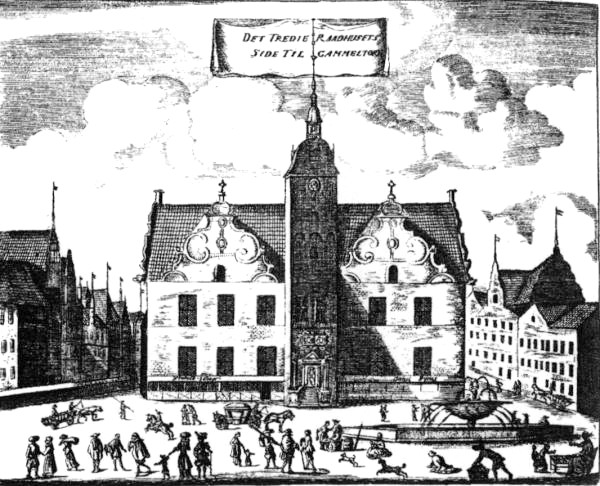
The city hall at Gammeltorv as it appeared after the rebuilding in 1610 as seen from Gammeltorv

Already prior to Absolon's construction of his castle on Slotsholmen, there seems to have been a marketplace at Gammeltorv, possibly also a Thing. Copenhagen's first town hall, of which practically nothing is known, was built on the east side of the square but later destroyed during Hanseatic capture and pillaging of the city in 1368. In 1374 the square is referred to as Forum and in 1446 the square is referred to as "the old square" as opposed to the somewhat younger Amagertorv. Since 1470 the name Gammeltorv has been used consistently.

In 1479 a new town hall was built on the southern side of Gammeltorv. Towards the end of the 16th century, King Frederick II provided for the construction of a water tube from Lake Emdrup. Six kilometres long, it was made from carved out tree trunks, and with an altitude difference of 9 metres the water pressure was high enough to erect Copenhagen's first fountain at Gammeltorv.

King Christian IV rebuilt the town hall in Renaissance style from 1608 to 1610. He also moved and redesigned Frederick II's fountain, creating the Caritas Well. It was also at this point that the area behind the town hall was cleared and Nytorv founded.

When Kongens Nytorv—King Christian V's grand new place royale—was established in 1670 and the area of the Copenhagen fortified was doubled, Gammeltorv lost its status as the focal square of the city.

=== Effects of the two fires ===
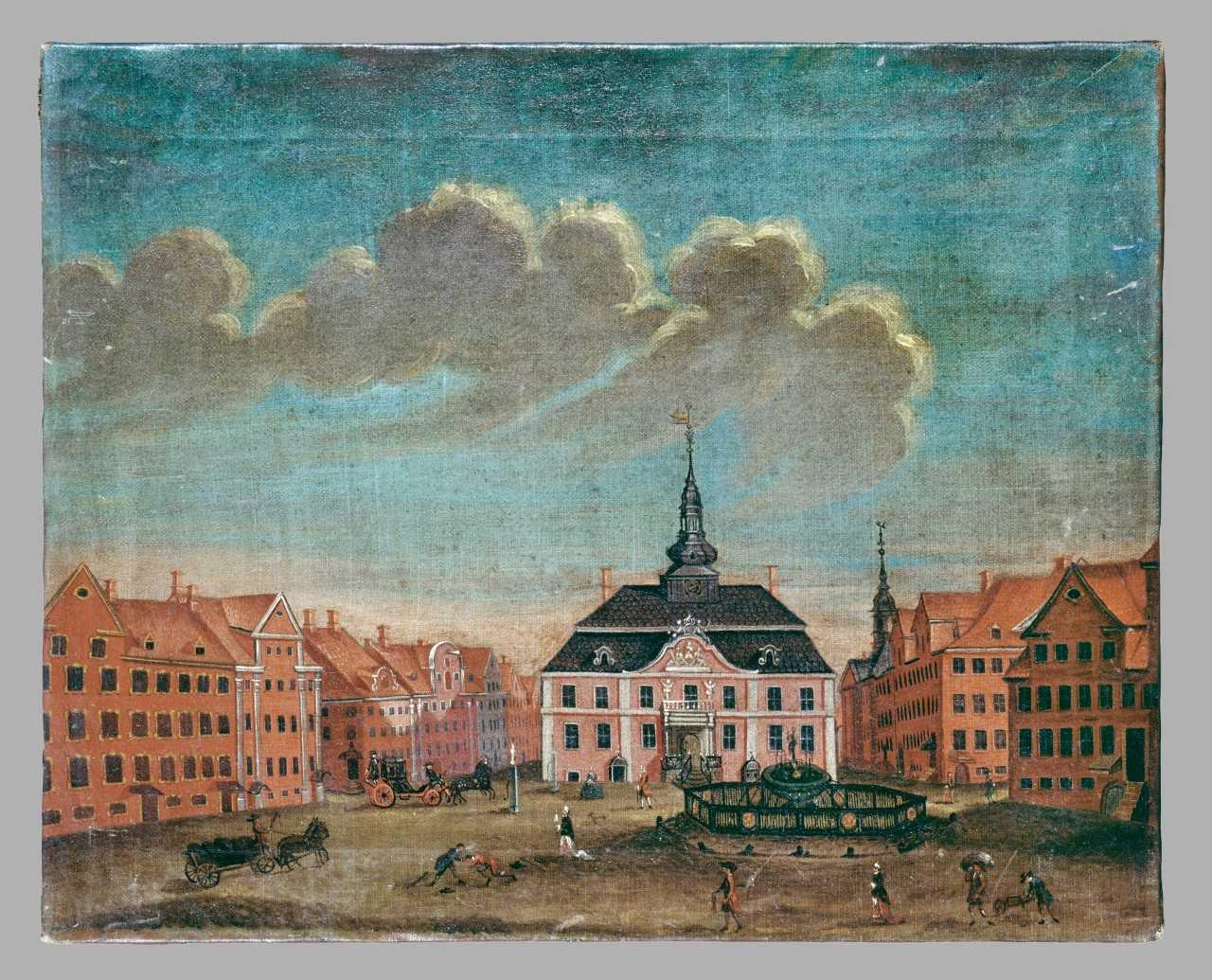
Gammeltorv with the Caritas Well and the new city hall, c. 1730, painting by Johannes Rach

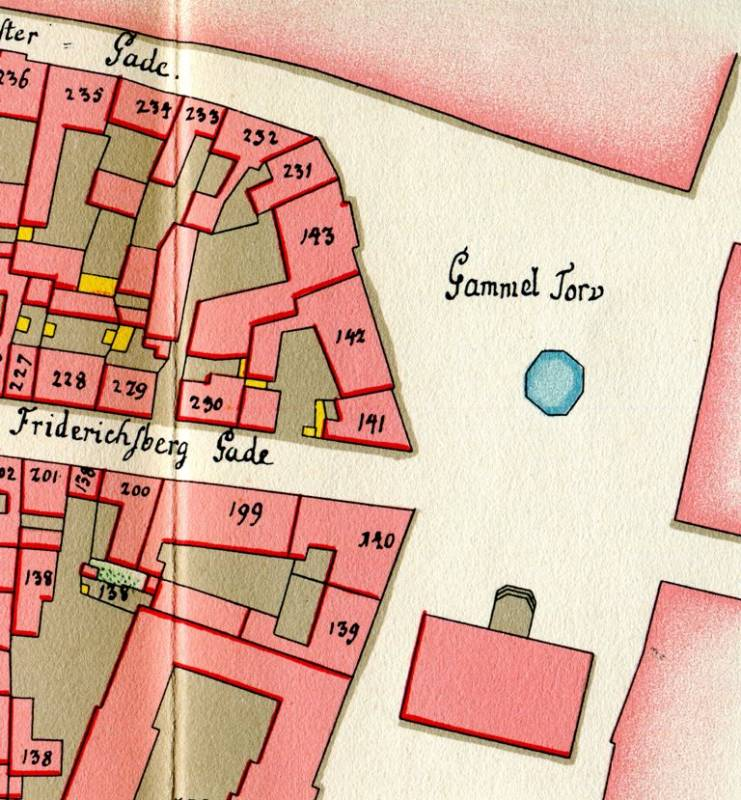
Gammeltorv seen on Gedde's map of Copenhagen's Vestre Quarter

In the Great Fire of 1728, the town hall was among the many buildings lost to the flames. A new town hall was erected on its foundation, built to a design of Johan Conrad Ernst and Johan Cornelius Krieger in the Baroque style. To commemorate the tercentenary of the House of Oldenburg's accent to the Danish throne, the City Magistrate erected an octagonal memorial temple in the square in 1749.

In the Copenhagen Fire of 1795 the city hall burnt down once again. After this it was moved to a site at Nytorv and the two earlier squares were merged to form one large, rectangular space. After the fire the buildings around the square were mainly rebuilt in the Neoclassical style typical of the time.

=== The meat market ===
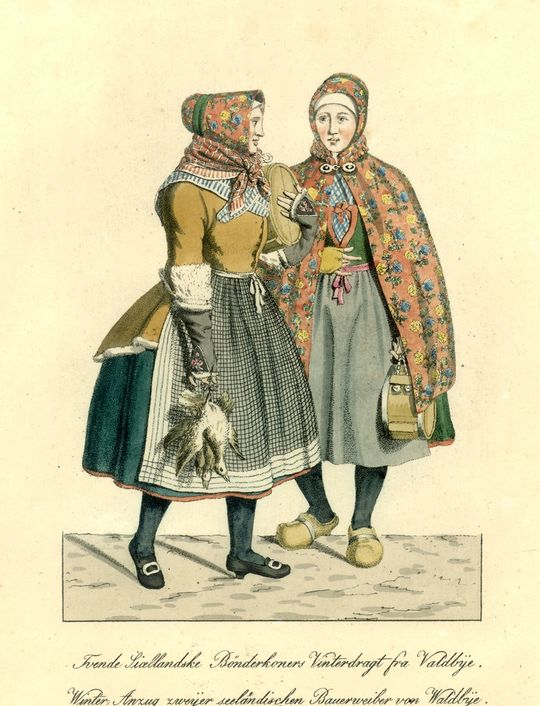
Chicken ladies at Gammeltorv, c. 1800

In spite of King Christian IV's refurbishments, Gammeltorv remained a crowded marketplace in the middle of an over-populated city which, away from the main streets, had not changed much since the Middle Ages.

After a royal decree on 28 July 1684 provided that all trade in fresh fruit and vegetables was to take place at Amagertorv, Gammeltorv had primarily been a meat market, mainly for trade in pork and poultry. The square was particularly known for its 'poultry ladies' who gathered around the Caritas Well, selling poultry and eggs. They came from the village of Valby unlike the vendours on Amagertorv who came from Amager.

=== Modern times ===
In 1901 a covered market hall was constructed in the Meat District, established by the City in 1879 to ensure ordered and hygienic handling of meat and livestock, but it was dedicated to trade in calf, sheep and lamb meat. After this the City's attention became directed at the trade at Gammeltorv and on 15 April 1910 a Pork Hall was inaugurated. From the same date all trade in pork meat was stopped at Gammeltorv while the poultry ladies were allowed to continue their activities by the Caritas Well until 1 April 1917.

Gammeltorv became increasingly dominated by cars and in the 1950s it turned into a car park. This was changed when the Strøget pedestrian zone was created starting in 1962.

== Notable buildings and residents ==
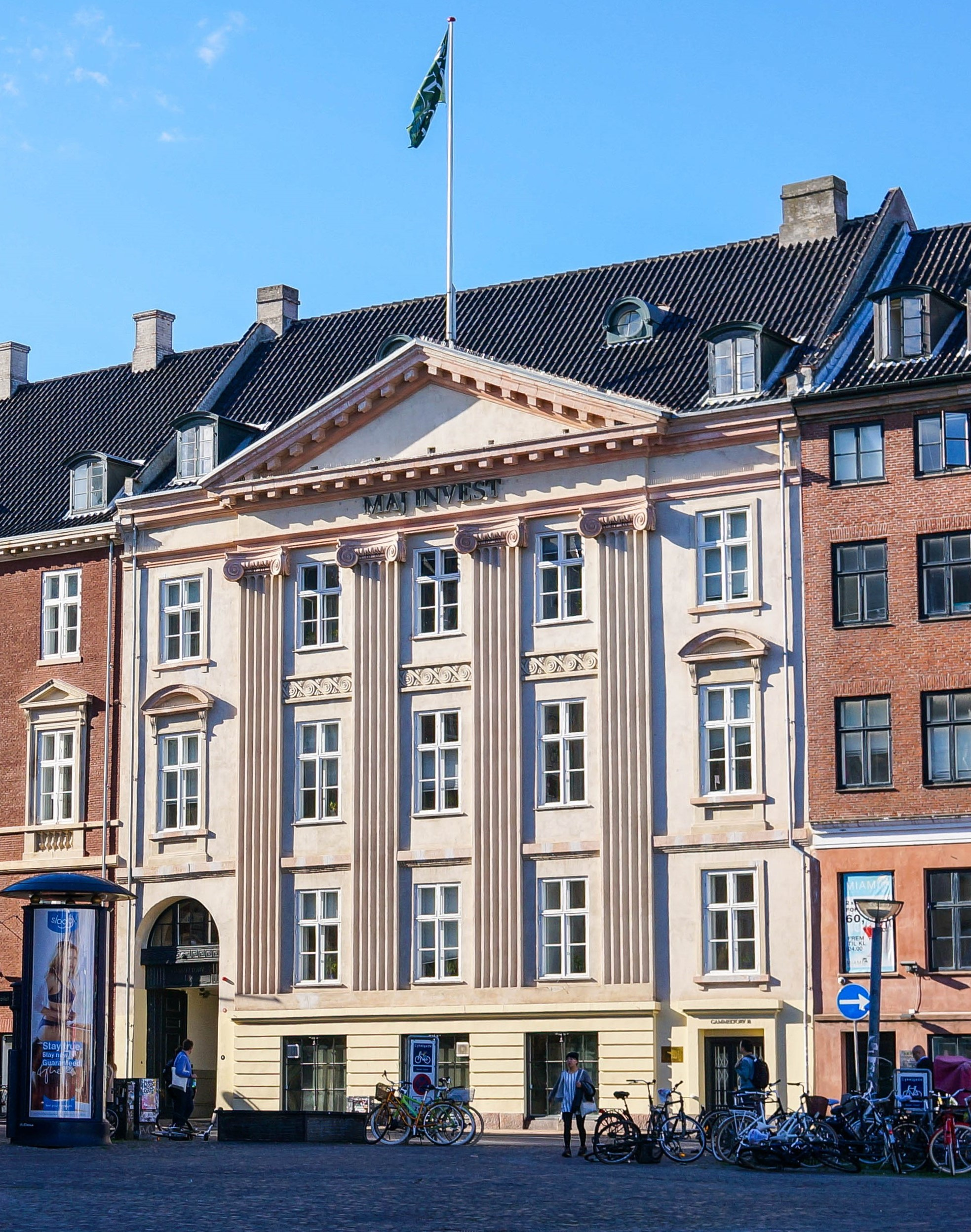
No. 18: The Bachmann House

A number of architectural styles are represented in spite of Gammeltorv's small size and harmonic character. No. 14, 16 and 18 on the square's north side and No. 20 and No. 22 on its west side all date from the years 1795–1801 but none of the architects are known. The more monumental of the three houses is the Bachmann House at No. 18. The facade is decorated with Ionic order pilasters and is tipped by a triangular pediment. The Suhr House at No. 22 is also decorated with Ionic order pilasters.

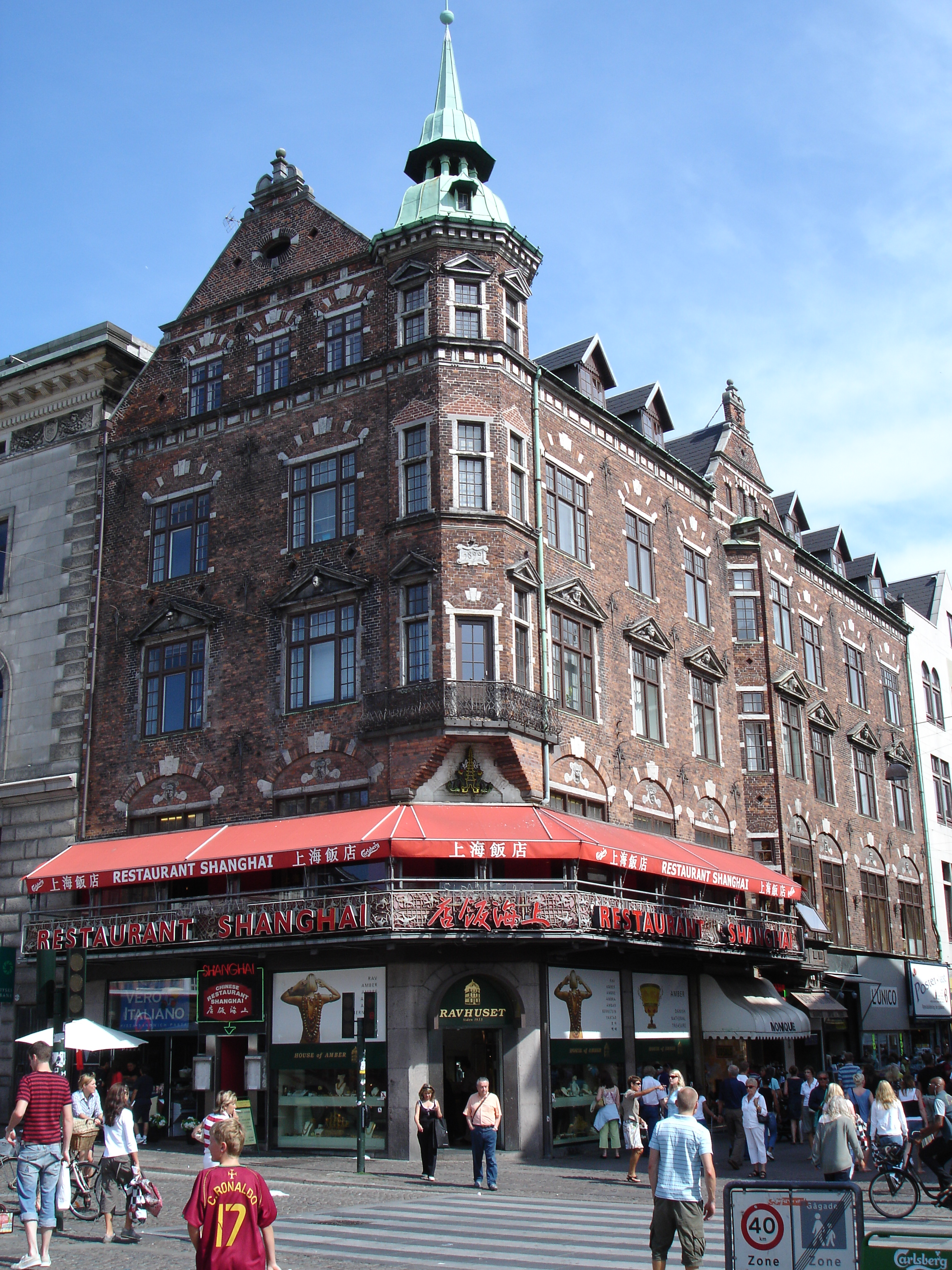
Gammeltorv 2

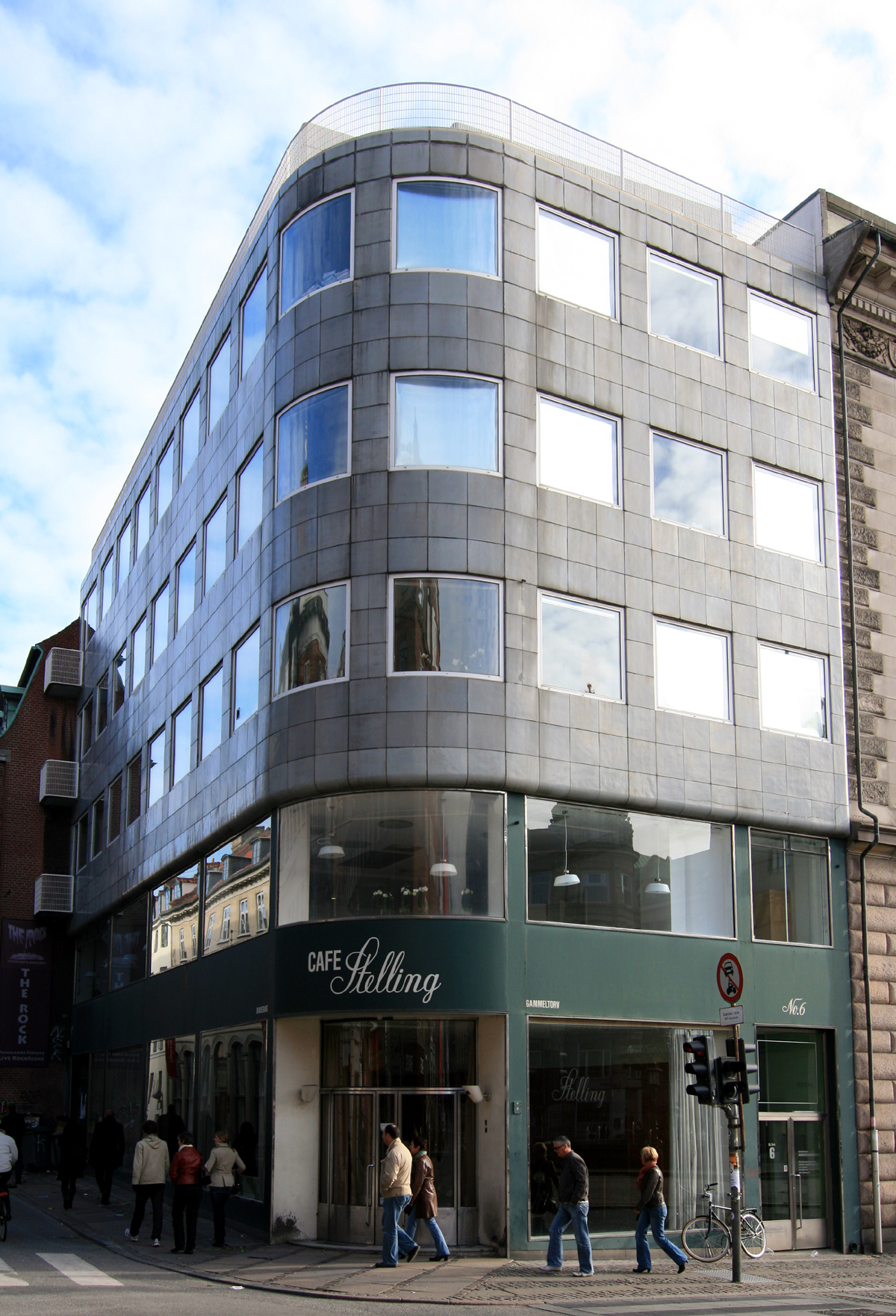
Arne Jacobsen's Stelling House at 6 Gammeltorv

The building on the corner with Frederiksborggade (Gammel Torv 24/Frederiksberggade 2) is from 1899 and was designed by Johan Schrøder. The building at the corner with Nygade (Gammel Torv 2/Nygade 6), on the other side of the square, is from 1898 and was designed by Aage Langeland-Mathiesen in a style inspired by Renaissance architecture. The neighbouring building (No. 4), with arched windows and rustication on the lower floors, was designed by Frederik Levy and is also from 1898.

The Neo-Baroque property at Gammel Torv 8 was built in 1906 to designs by Ulrik Plesner. The adjacent corner building Alexandrahus is a former cinema. The building was completed in 1942.

Arne Jacobsen's Stelling House on the corner of Skindergade is an early example of Functionalist architecture.

== Gammeltorv today ==
Today Gammeltorv is one of the busiest squares in central Copenhagen. At its latest refurbishment, conducted by city architect Otto Käszner in 1993, the footprint of the former city hall was marked in the paving with a paler stone.

A modern proof of Gammeltorv's historic role as the centre of the city is that house numbers in Copenhagen proceed from the end of the street which is located closest to the square.

== Panorama ==
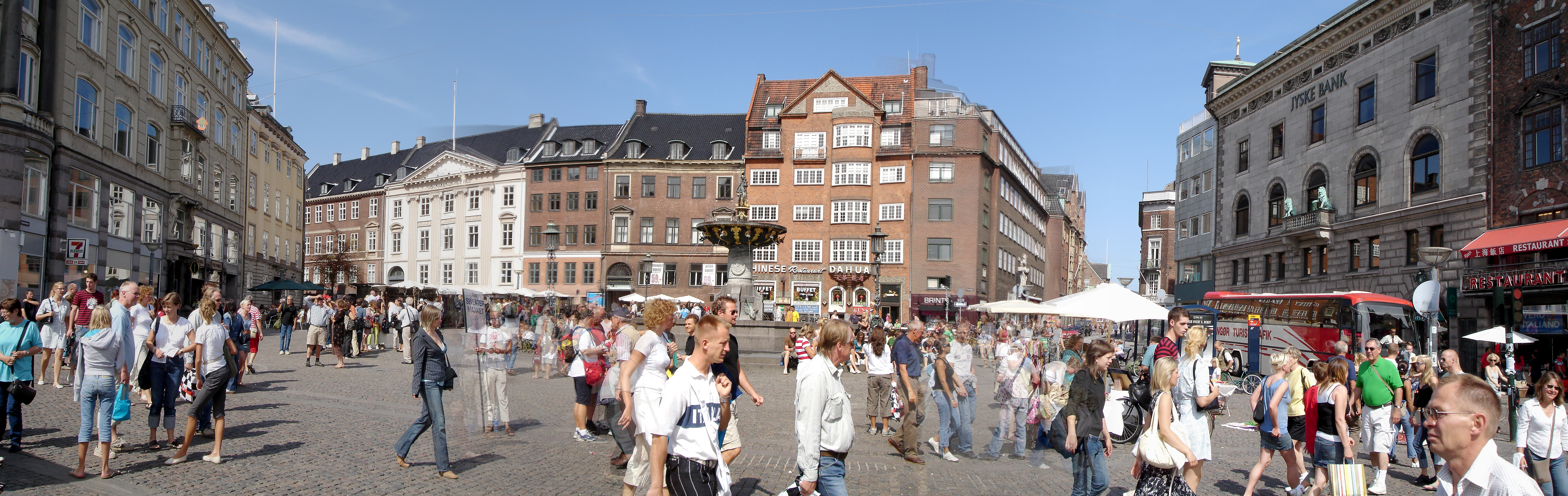
Gammeltorv panorama seen from the south

== See also ==
- Kongens Nytorv
