= Kattesundet =

Street in Copenhagen, Denmark

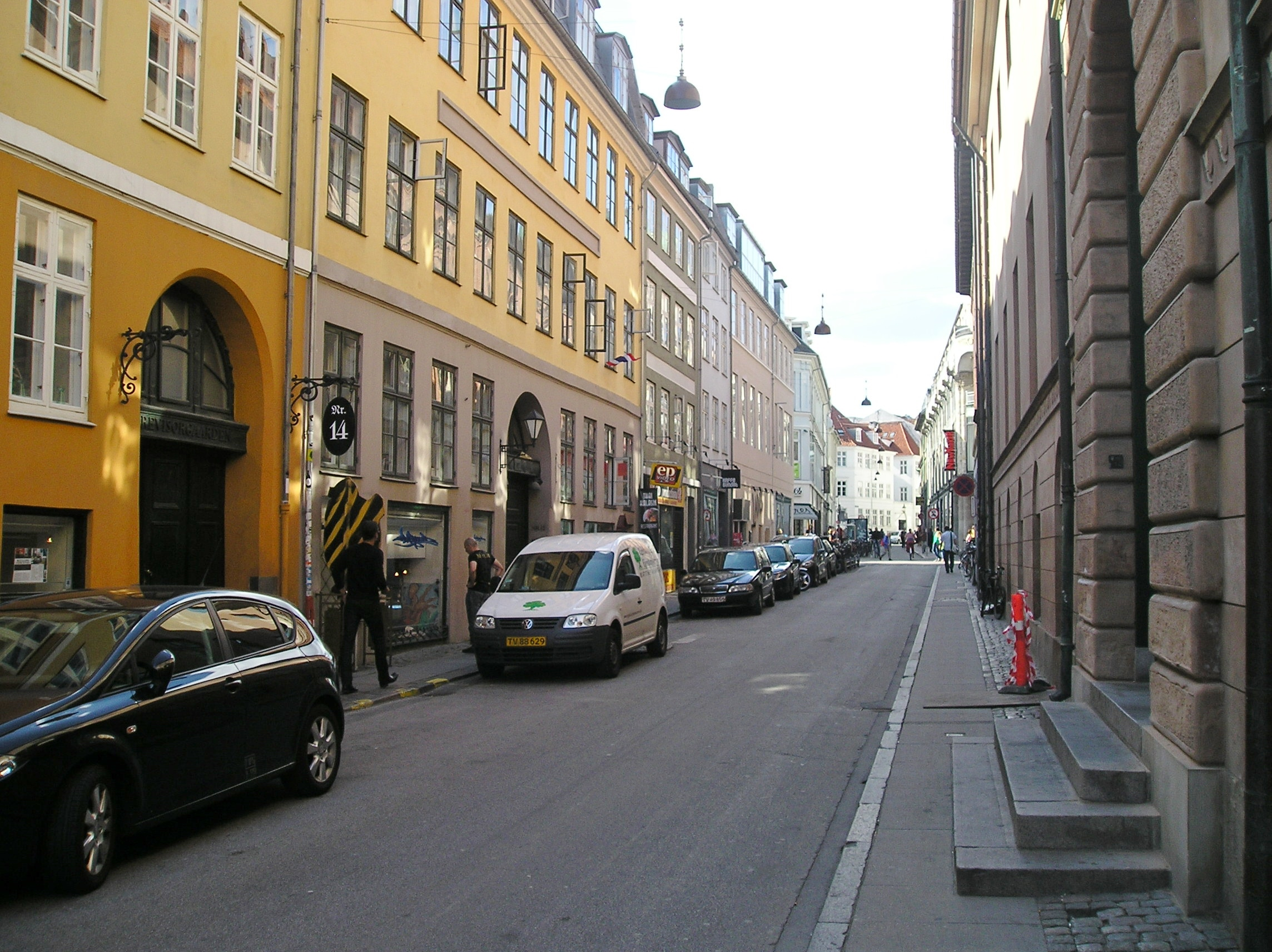
- Length: 169 m (554 ft)
- Location: Copenhagen, Denmark
- Quarter: City centre
- Nearest metro station: Rådhuspladsen
- Coordinates: 55°40′38.91″N 12°34′14.35″E
- Northwest end: Vestergade
- Major junctions: Strøget
- Southeast end: Lavendelstræde

Kattesundet (lit. "The Cat Strait") is a side street to the shopping street Strøget in the Old Town of Copenhagen, Denmark. It runs from Vestergade in the northwest to Lavendelstræde-Slutterigade in the southeast, linking Larsbjørnsstræde with Hestemøllestræde. The buildings that line the southwest side of the street (even numbers) all date from the years after the Copenhagen Fire of 1795. Six of them, No. 2 and No. 10-18, are listed in the Danish registry of protected buildings and places. The other side of the street is dominated by the rear side of Copenhagen Court House (No. 13) and the Anton Rosen Jugendstil Metropol Building from 1908.

== Etymology ==
The street name is also seen in a number of other towns in Denmark, Sweden and Germany. The origins of the name is unclear. Although some speculate that it was originally used by sailors as a name for a narrow, treacherous strait (that only a cat could pass through). This name was later changed to narrow alleys. The name may, however, more specifically, have referred to a narrow strait between the old coastline at Løngangstræde and a small isle approximately where the National Museum is now located.

== History ==
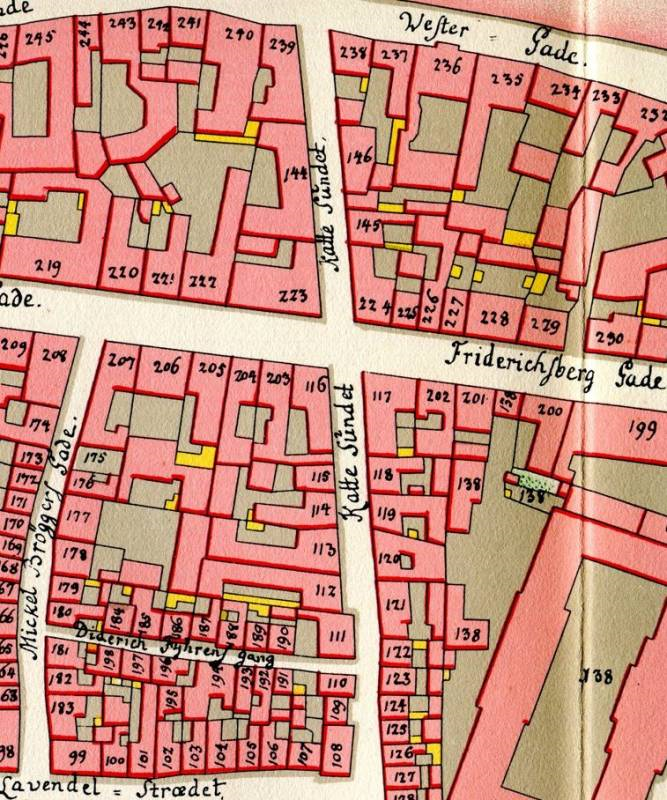
Kattesundet seen on a detail from on Gedde's district map

The southern part of Kattesundet is one of the oldest streets in Copenhagen. In the Middle Ages, Hestemøllestræde, its southern extension, was also known under the name.

Diderich Fyrens (Fuirens) Gang, a just three metres wide alleyway, connected the street (at No. 14-16) to Mikkel Bryggers Gade (at No, 7–9) to the southwest. It took its name after the merchant Henrich Fuiren.

The street was completely destroyed by the Copenhagen Fire of 1728. When the city was rebuilt, Kattesundet was extended northwards to Vestergade across the new street Frederiksberggade.

The street was again destroyed by the Copenhagen Fire of 1795. Diderich Fyrens (Fuirens) Gang was not rebuilt after the fire, and the new City Hall was some 20 years later built at the northeast side of the street.

Most of the buildings at the corners of the more busy intersecting streets Frederiksberggade and Vestergade were replaced by modern commercial buildings in the 1900s.

== Notable buildings and structures ==
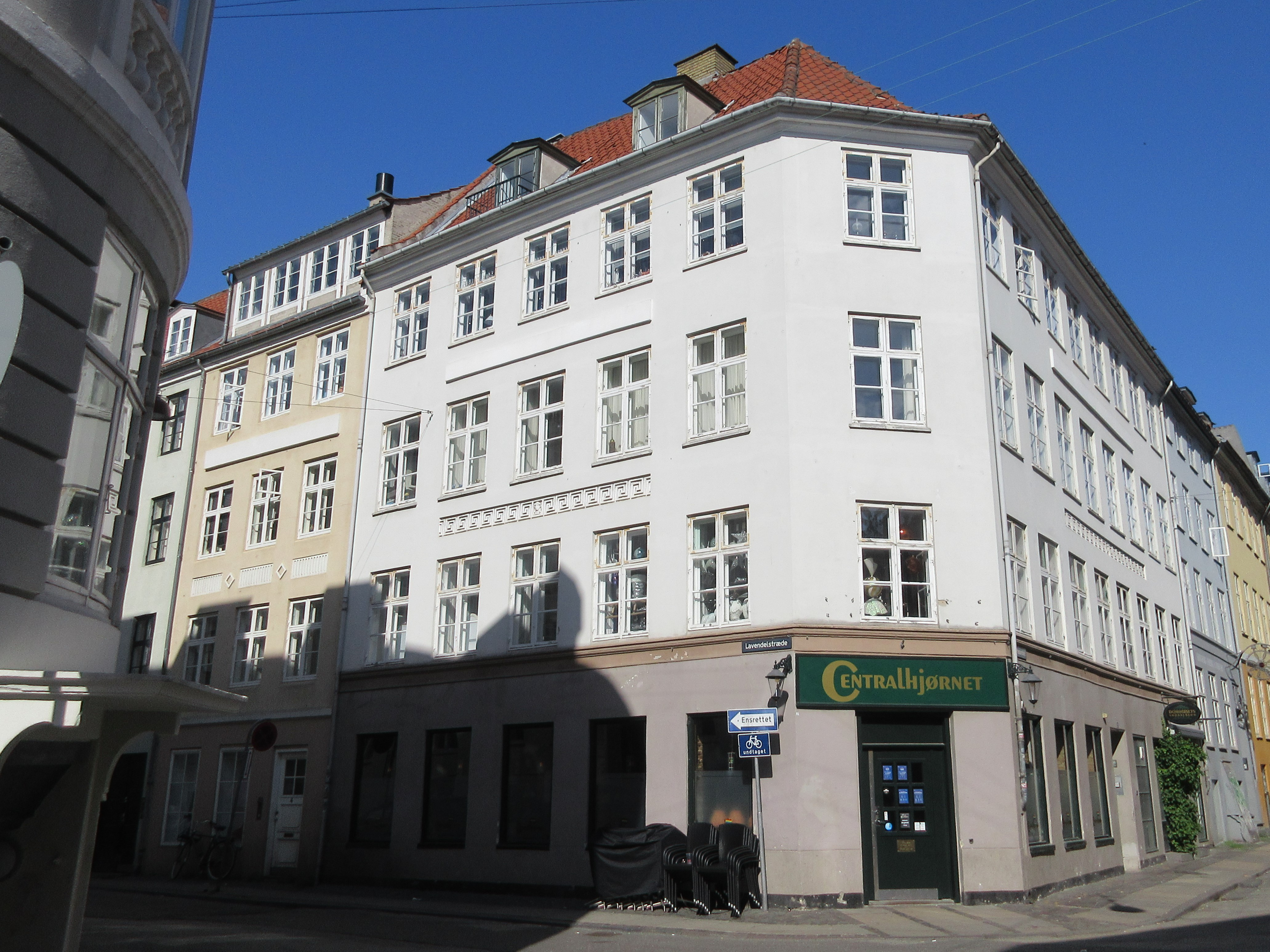
Kattesundet 18

The Neoclassical corner building at No. 2, was built in 1797–98 by the master builders Frantz Philip Lange and Lauritz Thrane, It was listed on the Danish registry of protected buildings and places in 1959. The Neoclassical corner building at No. 18 was built by master builder Carl Christian Martens in 1802. It was listed in 1964. The two small houses at No. 10 (1795–1800), No. 12 (1797–1799), No. 14 (1799–1801) and No. 16 (1828) are also listed.

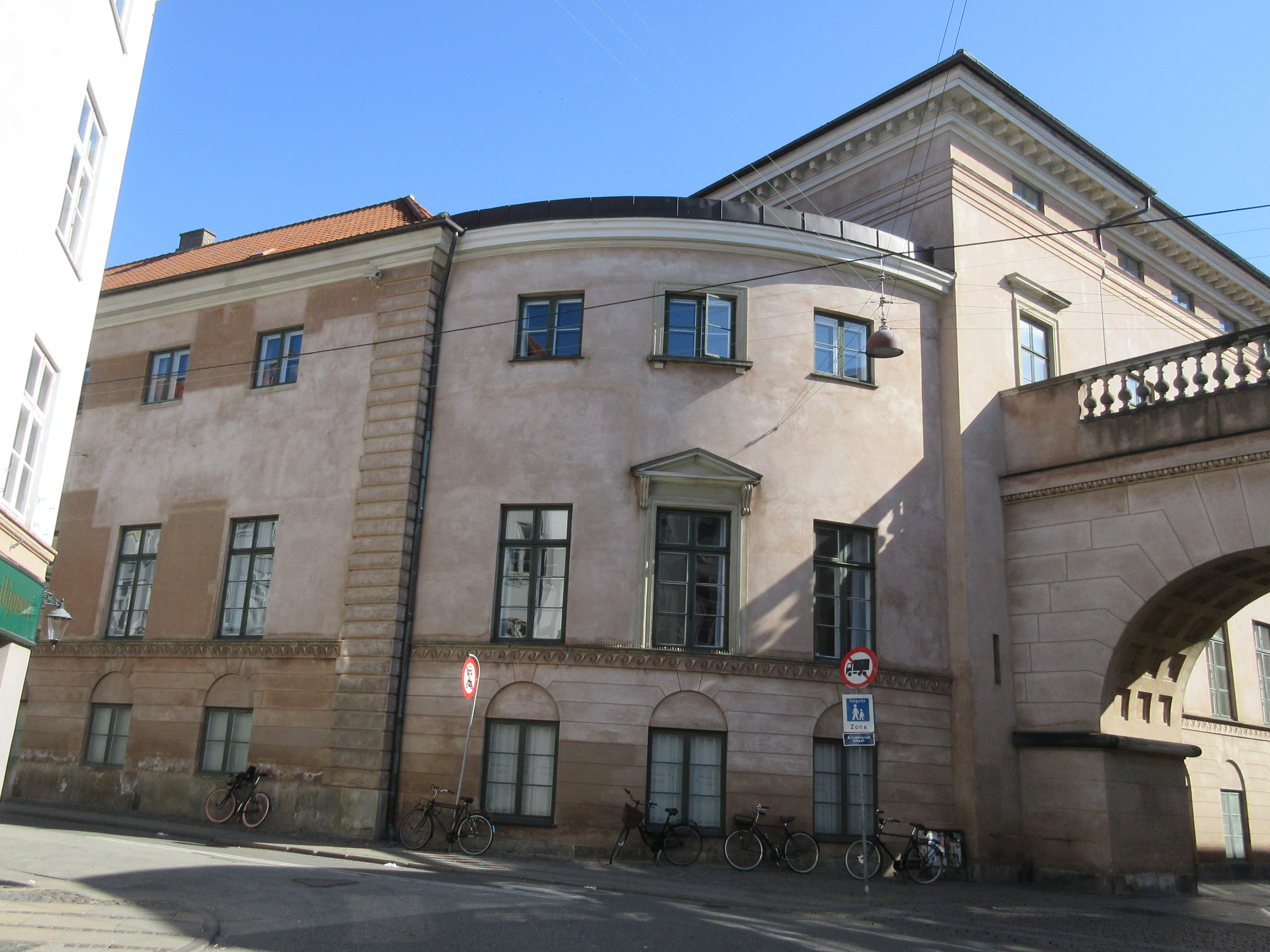
The rear side of Copenhagen Court House

The former City Hall, now Copenhagen Court House (No. 13), was designed by Christian Frederik Hansen. The building houses Københavns Byret.

The Metropol Building (Kattesundet 3 / Vestergade 9 / Frederiksberggade 16), a former department store, was built in 1908 to a Jugendstil design by Anton Rosen. In 1924, it was converted into a cinema by Viggo Jacobsen and Albert Oppenheim.

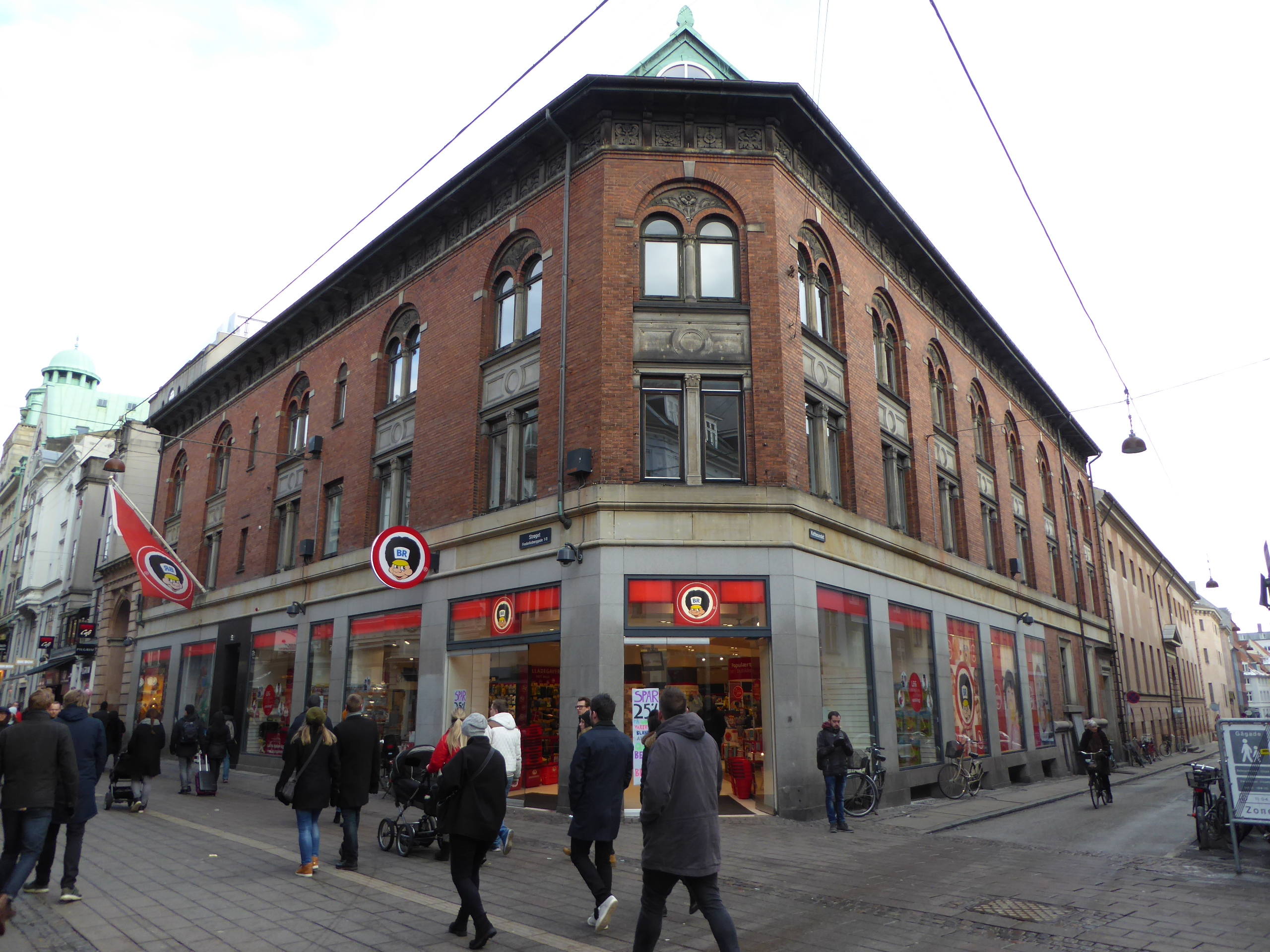
No, 9-11: The Revisionsbanken Building

The corner building at Kattesundet 9-11 / Frederiksberggade 11 is the former headquarters of Revisionsbanken. The building was completed to a Renaissance Revival design by Carl Thonning and Alfred Møller. Kattesundet 1 / Vestergade 13 was built for the tobacco company Brødrene Bruun in 1906-1907 and was also designed by Carl Thonning.

== Transport ==
The street is only open to one-way traffic in the direction from Vestergade to Lavendelstræde. The nearest metro station is Rådhuspladsen.
