= Carl Christian Martens =

Danish master bricklayer and architect

- Born: 1754
- Died: 1820 (aged 65–66)
- Burial place: Asminderød Cemetery, Fredensborg, Denmark
- Other names: Christian Martens; C.C. Martens
- Education: Royal Danish Academy of Fine Arts Building School
- Occupations: Bricklayer, architect
- Spouse: Ernestine Wegener (m. 1784)
- Parent(s): Joachim Christian Martens (father); Johanne Kirstine Arhellig(e) (mother)

Carl Christian Martens (1754–1820), variously referred to as Christian Martens and C. C. Martens, was a Danish master bricklayer and architect. He was elderman of the Bricklayers' Guild in Copenhagen and contributed to the rebuilding of the city in the years after the Copenhagen Fire of 1795. Most of his surviving buildings have been listed on the Danish Registry of Protected Buildings and Places.

== Early life and education ==
Martens was born in 1754 to Joachim Christian Martens and Johanne Kirstine Arhellig(e). He was trained as a bricklayer and attended the Royal Danish Academy of Fine Arts' Building School in 1768 and 1775, He won the Academy's small silver medal in 1771 and its large silver medal in 1775. He registered for the competition for the gold medal in 1775.

== Career ==
Martens was granted citizenship as a master bricklayer in Copenhagen in 1777. He was alderman of the Bricklayers' Guild in 1793–99. He was also active in Copenhagen Fire Department (as was typical for the city's master craftsmen at the time). He contributed to the rebuilding of Copenhagen in the years after the Great Fire of 1795.

== Personal life ==
Martens married Ernestine Wegener on 10 November 1784 in Copenhagen. He died in 1820 and is buried in Asminderød Cemetery at Fredensborg.

== Works ==
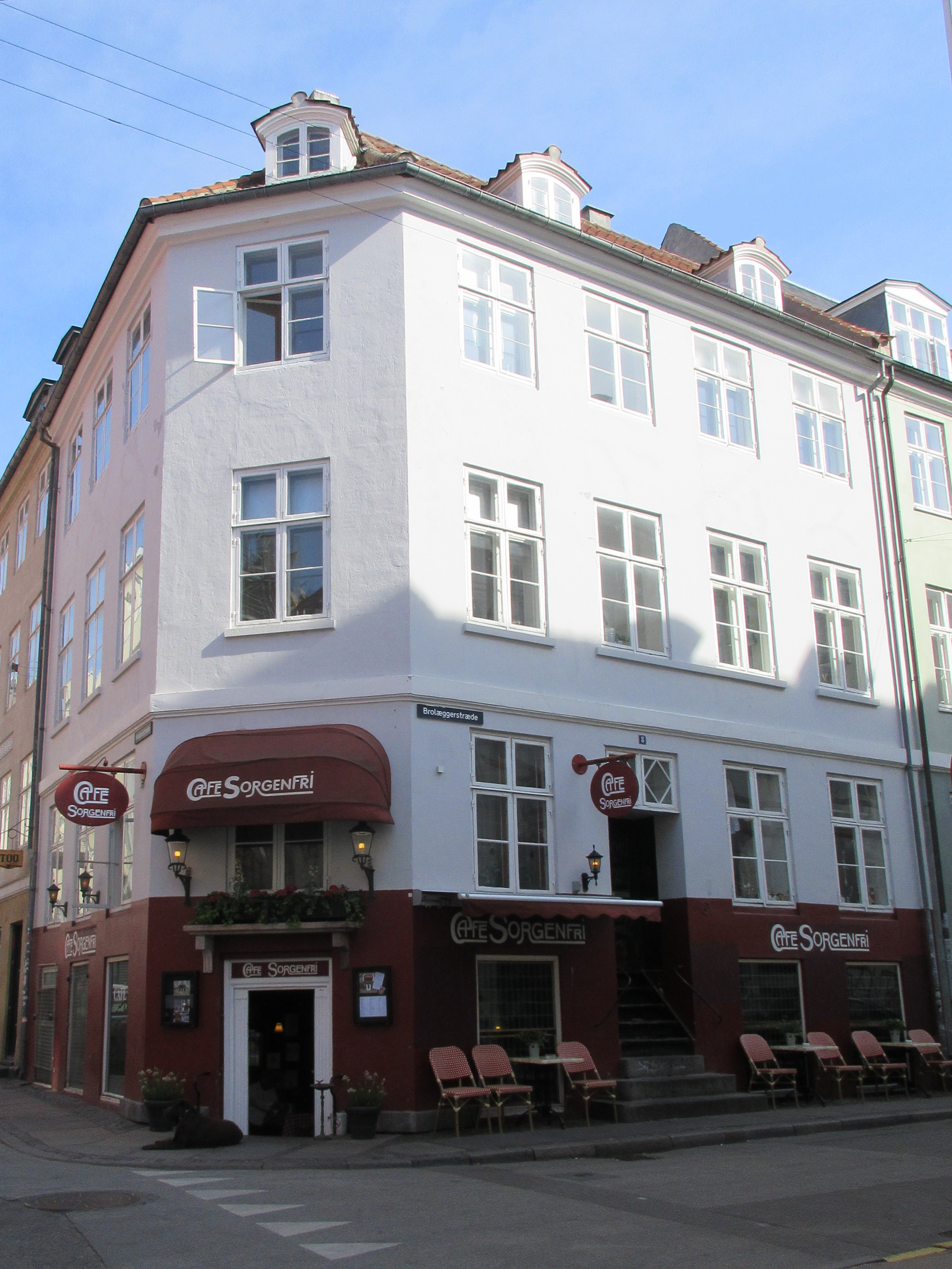
Brolæggerstræde 8

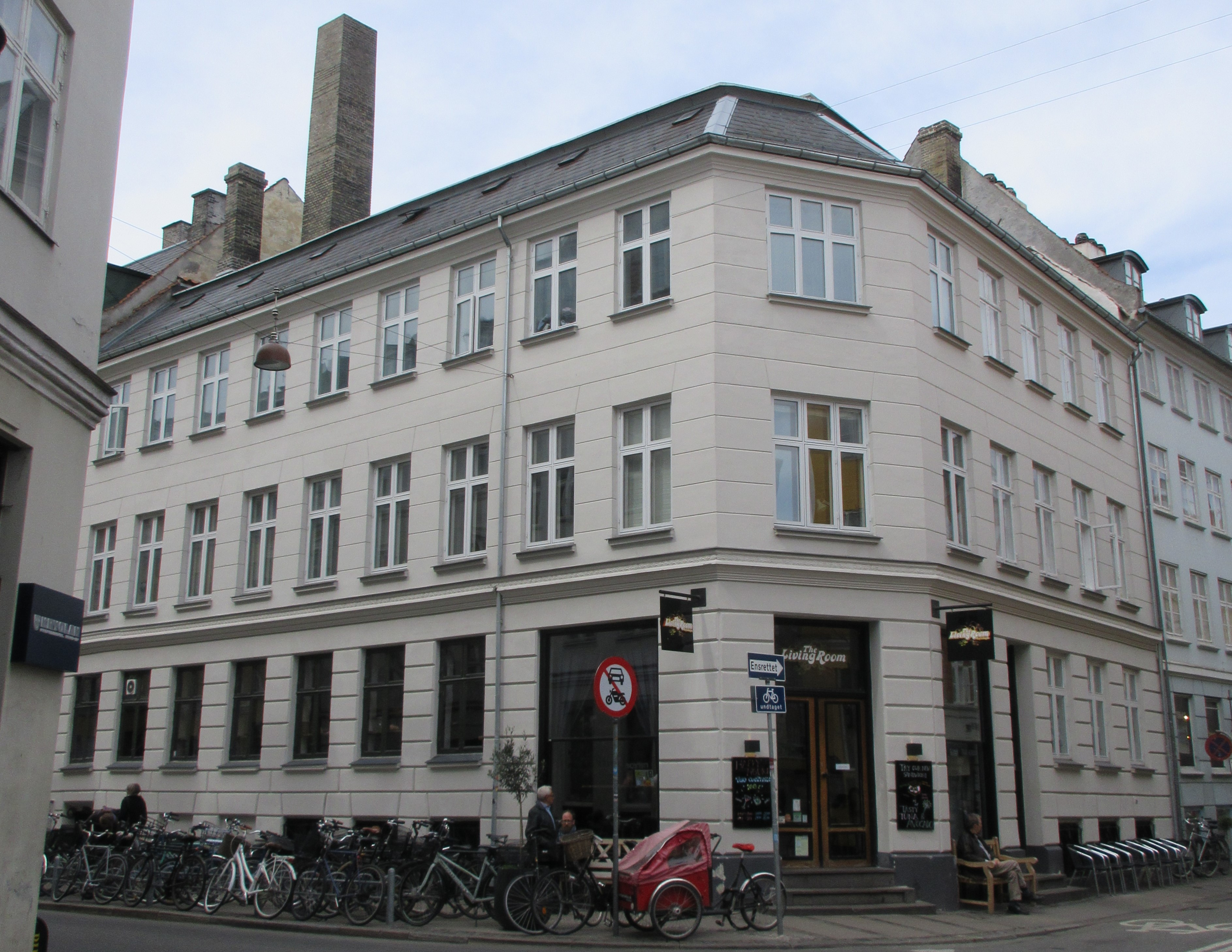
Larsbjørnsstræde 16

Martens constructed and designed the following buildings:

- Knabrostræde 12 Copenhagen (1795–96)
- Brolæggerstræde 8/Knabrostræde (1796–97; listed in 1950)
- Bremerholm 33/Laksegade 17m Copenhagen (1796–97, demolished)
- Laksegade 31, Copenhagen (demolished)
- Holmens Kanal 6, Copenhagen (1798, demolished)
- Holmens Kanal 8, Copenhagen (1798, demolished)
- Studiestræde 21, Copenhagen (1797, heightened in 1890; listed in 1951)
- Studiestræde 8, Copenhagen (1798; listed in 1996)
- Larsbjørnsstræde 16/Studiestræde 23, Copenhagen (1798; listed in 1964)
- Læderstræde 16, Copenhagen (1799-1800)
- Amagertorv 15, Copenhagen (1799-1800)
- Kattesundet 18/Lavendelstræde 2 (1802, listed in 1964)
- Kronprinsensgade 5, Copenhagen (1803–05; listed in 1918)
- Nørre Voldgade 20/Teglgårdstræde 15 (1808–09)
