= Studiestræde 8 =

Building in Copenhagen, Denmark

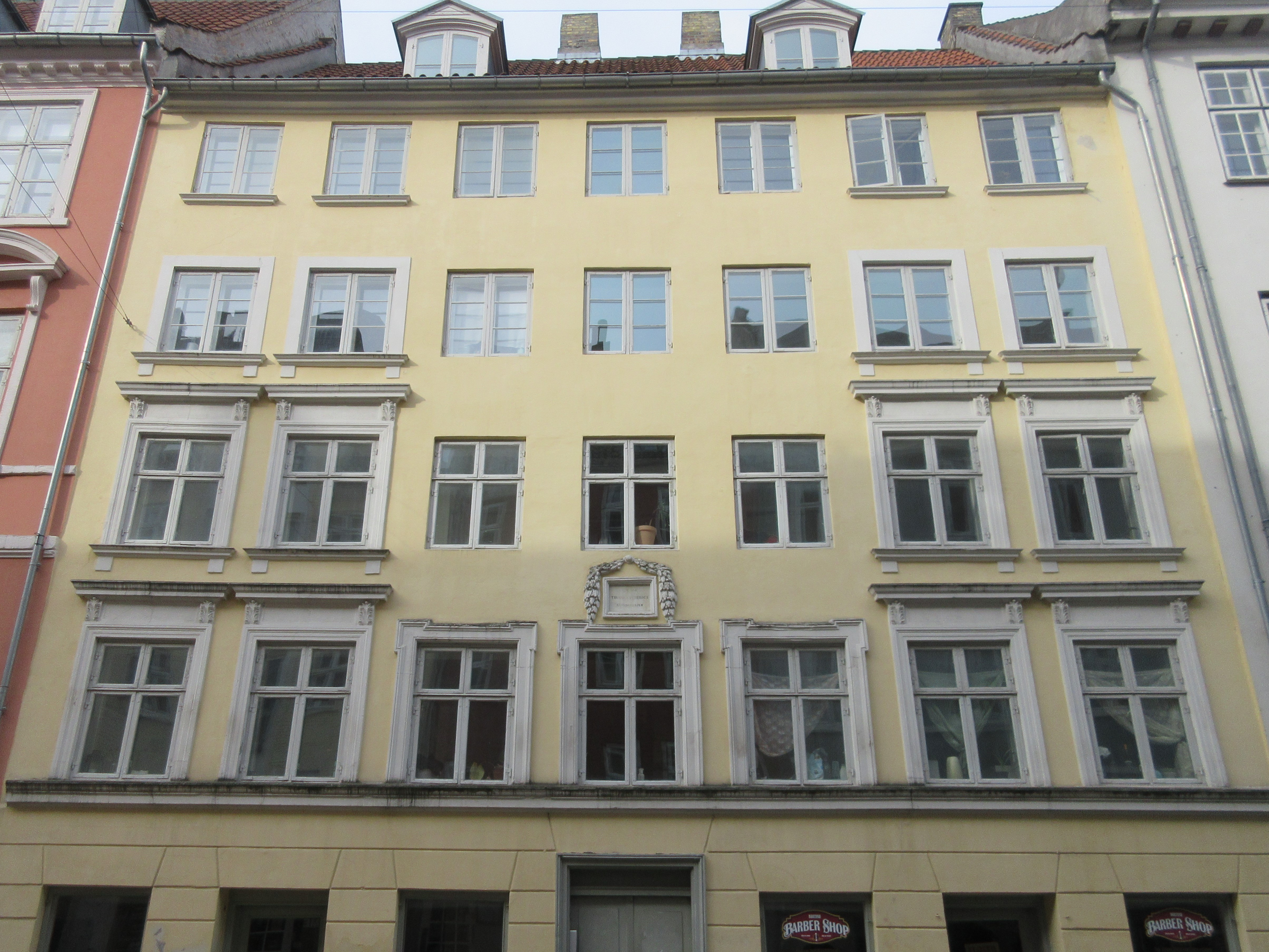
- Interactive map of the Studiestræde 8 area

General information
- Location: Copenhagen, Denmark
- Coordinates: 55°40′44.47″N 12°34′13.37″E
- Completed: 1798

Studiestræde 8, also known as Noahs Ark, is a Neoclassical property in the Latin Quarter of Copenhagen, Denmark, The building was listed in the Danish registry of protected buildings and places in 1996. A plaque over the central window on the first floor commemorates that the playwright and theatre historian Thomas Overskou lived in the building as a child.

== History ==
Two smaller houses at the site were destroyed in the Copenhagen Fire of 1795. The two lots were acquired by Carl Christian Madsen for 1,115 rigsdaler and merged. He initiated the construction of a tenement house at the site but had prior to its completion in 1798 already sold it to wigmaker Carl Christian Wegner for 8,500 rigsdaler. The small apartments were rented out to low-income families for a biannual rent of six Danish rigsdaler for a one and a half room apartment (1801). Wegner lived in the apartment on the ground floor towards the street. In 1802, he sold the building for 9,700 rigsdaler. The new owner, Peter Hansen, a former coachman, opened a grocer's shop in the ground floor. The rear wing alone contained 16 apartments. The later playwright and theatre historian Thomas Overskou lived with his parents in one of the small apartments as a child from April 1806. His father was a worker in the sugar refinery at Store Larsbjørnsstræde 9. Hansen and a maid named Margrethe saved the property from the flames during the British bombardment on the night between 3 and 4 September 1807 by putting out 17 bombs and five fire arrows. According to Thomas Overskou, who has described the events in his memoirs, the two people never fully recovered from the physical and psychological stress of the situation. Hansen owned the property until his death 12 years later. His widow sold it to grocer Jeppe Petersen in 1830.

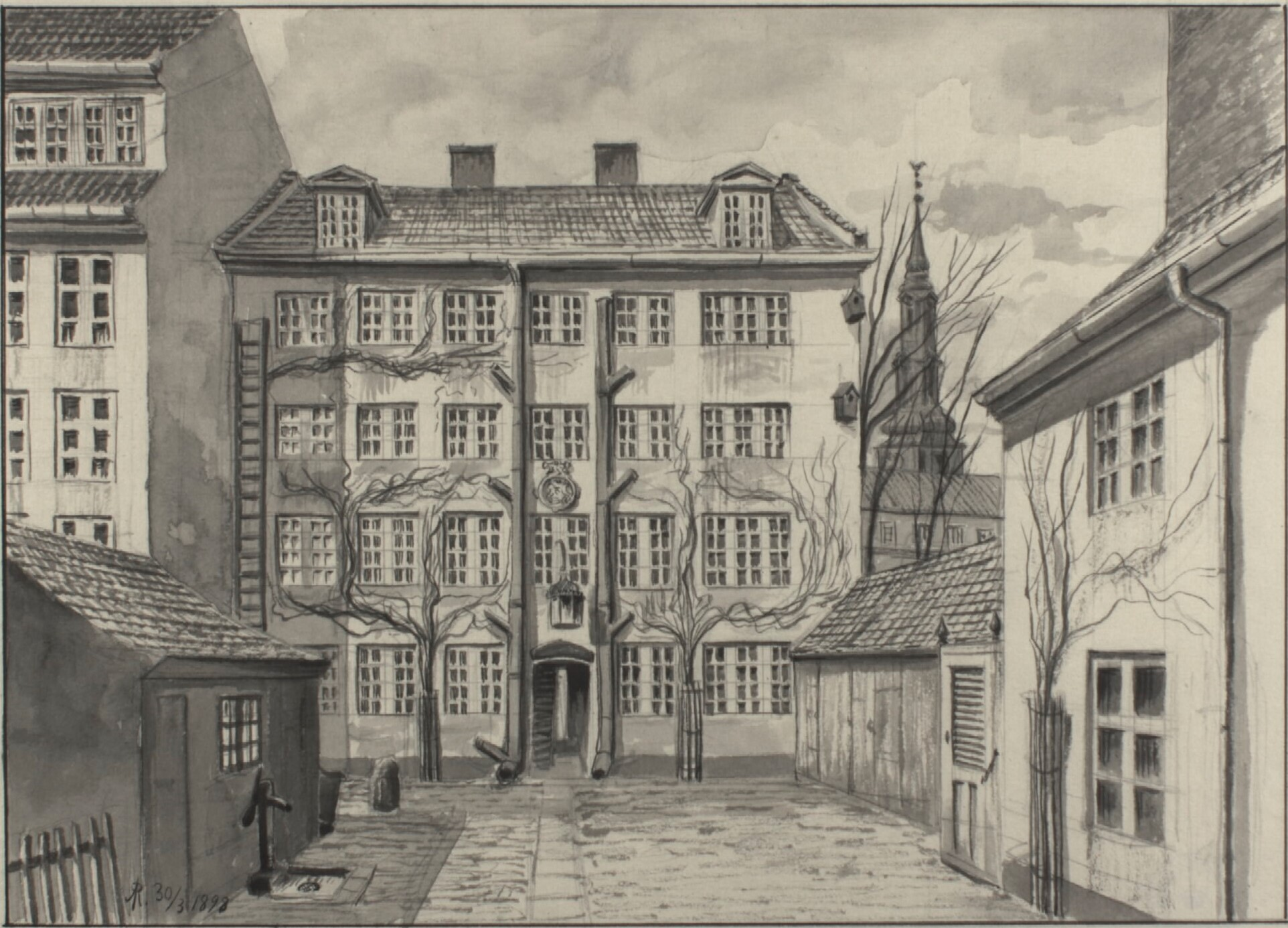
The building viewed from the yard on a drawing from 30 March 1888.

The building was from 1862 to circa 1891 owned by master painter C. Jensen. The next owner was master mason J. Larsen. The building was in 1919 together with other old houses in the neighbourhood acquired by the University of Copenhagen to allow for a later extension of its premises.

== Architecture ==
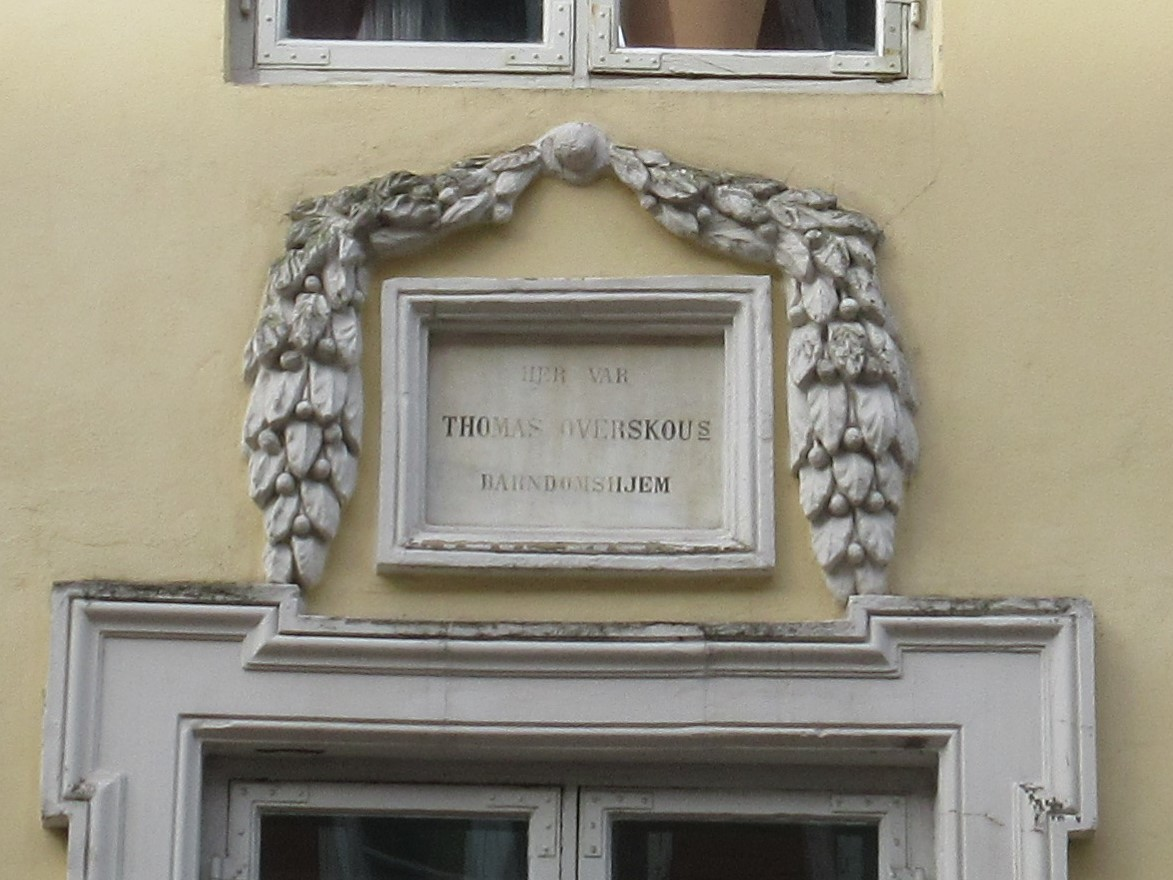
The commemorative plaque

The building consists of four storeys over a raised cellar and is seven bays wide. A plaque over the central window on the first floor commemorates that Thomas Overskou lived in the building as a child.

The building was listed in the Danish registry of protected buildings and places in 1996.

== See also ==
- Studiestræde 10
