= Studiestræde 21 =

Building in Copenhagen, Denmark

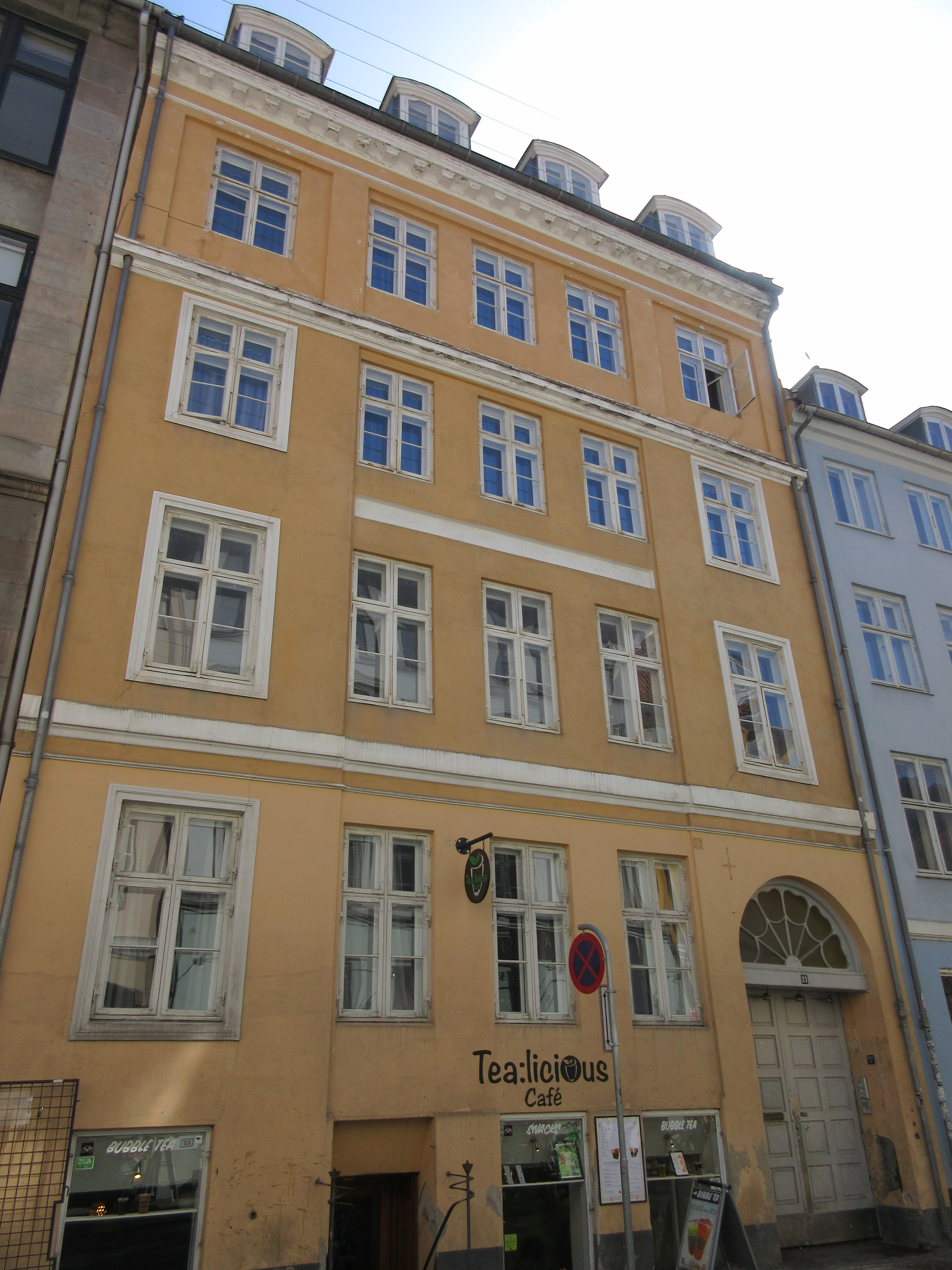
- Interactive map of the Studiestræde 21 area

General information
- Location: Copenhagen, Denmark
- Coordinates: 55°40′42.85″N 12°34′10.74″E
- Completed: 1797

Studiestræde 21 is a Neoclassical property in the Latin Quarter of Copenhagen, Denmark. The building was listed on the Danish registry of protected buildings and places in 1951,

== History ==
=== Site history, 1689–1795 ===
Back in the 17th century, the site was part of three different properties. One of them was listed in Copenhagen's first cadastre from 1689 as No. 66 in Northern Quarter, owned by master mason : Christoffer Decher. Another one was listed as No. 183, owned by Anders Gudmandsen. The third property was listed as No. 184, owned by Johan Santmand. The present property was later created from part of these three properties. It was listed in the new cadastre of 1756 as No. 68 in Northern Quarter, owned by distiller Jørgen Sørensen.

=== Martens and the new building ===
The building was destriyed in the Copenhagen Fire of 1795, together with most of the other buildings in the area. The present building on the site was constructed in 1797 by master builder Carl Christian Martens.

=== Weile & Springer ===
The property was acquired by Jens J. Wejle. His property was home to four households at the 1801 census. Jens J. Weile resided in the building with his wife Maren Weilem their three children (aged one to 14), a maid, two soldiers and a carpenter. Niels Jensen, a beer seller (øltapper), resided in the building with his wife Trine Pedersdatter and their two-year-old daughter. Casper Erich & colon. Juul, a painting firm, was also based in the building. Susanne Goldzm a widow, resided in the building with a maid, a carpenter and a workman.

The property was later acquired by a distiller named Weile. In the new cadastre of 1806, his property was listed as No. 63 in Northern Quarter. The building was from circa 1807 home to a distillery, =Weile & Springer. The Icelandic scholar Finnur Magnusson was a resident in the building in around 1820.

=== Thyge and Johan Frederik Christensen ===
The property was home to three households at the 1840 census. Thye Christensen, a distiller, resided on the ground floor with his wife Margrethe Rasmussen, their three children (aged 15 to 21), three male servants and a maid. Marie Kirstine Franse, a widow with a pension, resided on the first floor with her son Christian Didrik Franse and one maid. Severine Clausen and Peter Christjan Lyng, a widow employed with woodwork and a man employed with woodwork and in the construction industry, lived together on the second floor.

Thyge Christensen died in the 1840s. His widow Magrete Christensen was the owner of the property at the 1850 census. She lived on the ground floor with her four children (aged 12 to 27), three male servants and a ma. Anna Catharine Deichmann, a widow, resided on the second floor with her daughter Othilia Deichmann and a maid. Johanne Mein, another widow, resided on the second floor with her son Ane Mein.

The building and distillery was later passed down to Johan Frederik Christensen. His property was home to three households at the 1850 census. Johan Frederik Christensen resided on the ground floor with his wife Ane Catrine Christensen (née Böhme), their three children (aged four to nine), two male servants and two maids. Erich Boring Peter Severin Seehausen. a businessman ( Commisionair), resided on the first floor with his wife Frederikke Kirstine Seehaunsen (née Rohkohl), their two children (aged nine and 22) and a lodger. Jacob Theodor Sørensenm a tobacco spinner, resided on the second floor with his wife Laura Emilie Henriette Sørensen (née Prehn), their three children (aged two to six= and one lodger.

Christensen's property was home to 14 residents at the 1880 census. Johan Frederik Christensen resided on the ground floor with his wife Anne Cathrine Christensen, five of their children (aged six to 28), a maid and two distillery works. Laura Emilie Henriette Sørensen (née f. Poulsen), a seemstress, resided on the second floor with two of her children (aged six and 21) and the widow Ane Prahl (née Musmann).

J. F. Christensen's distillery closed in 1888 as the last of the many small distilleries in the city's North Quarter.

=== 20th century ===
The brothers Christen and P. M. Daell from Aalborg established a mail order business on the first floor on 12 January 1910. The venture was an immediate success and soon had to move to larger premises at Nørregade 12. It would later develop into the department store Daells Varehus.

Furniture maker Jacob Kjær operated a furniture workshop in the courtyard from 1928 to 1950. He created the furniture for the Danish pavilion at the 1929 Barcelona International Exposition. Some of his works are now owned by the Danish Design Museum.

In 1994-95, Mødrehjælpen acquired the building for DKK 6 millions.

== Architecture ==
The building consists of four storeys over a raised cellar. The fourth storey was added in 1890. The building is give bays wide and the two outer bays are slightly projecting compared to the three central ones. The gate is topped by a fanlight.

== Today ==
Tea:licious, a café specializing in tea, is based in the basement.
