= Lavendelstræde =

Street in Copenhagen, Denmark

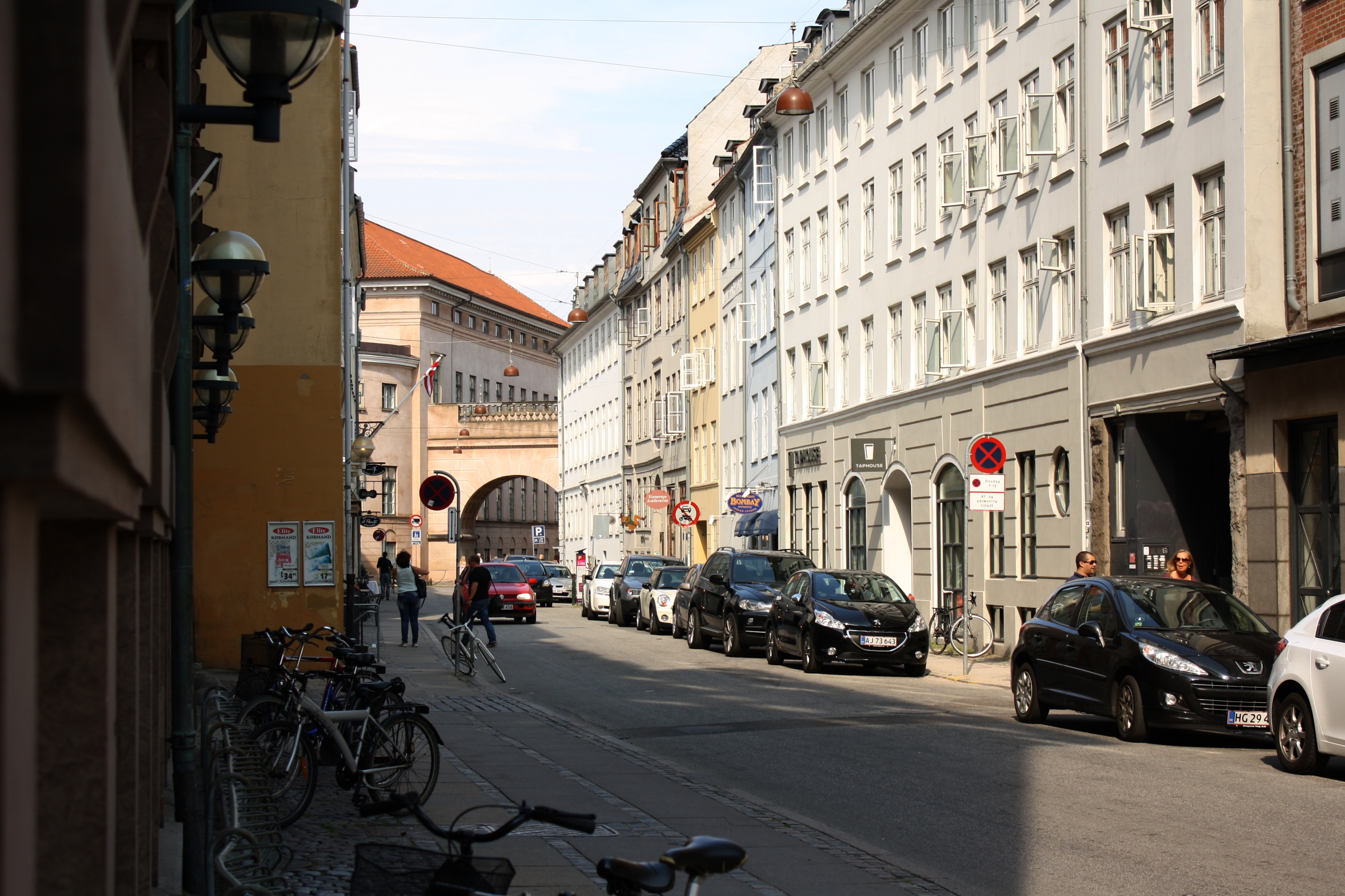
- Length: 157 m (515 ft)
- Location: Copenhagen, Denmark
- Quarter: City centre
- Nearest metro station: Rdhuspladsen
- Coordinates: 55°40′35.04″N 12°34′18.12″E
- Southwest end: City Hall Square

Lavendelstræde (lit. "Lavender Street") is a street in the old town of Copenhagen, Denmark). It runs from Kattesundet-Hestemøllestræde in the northeast to Vester Voldgade in the west, linking Slutterigade and Nytorv and at Regnbuepladsen and Copenhagen City Hall in the southwest.

== History ==
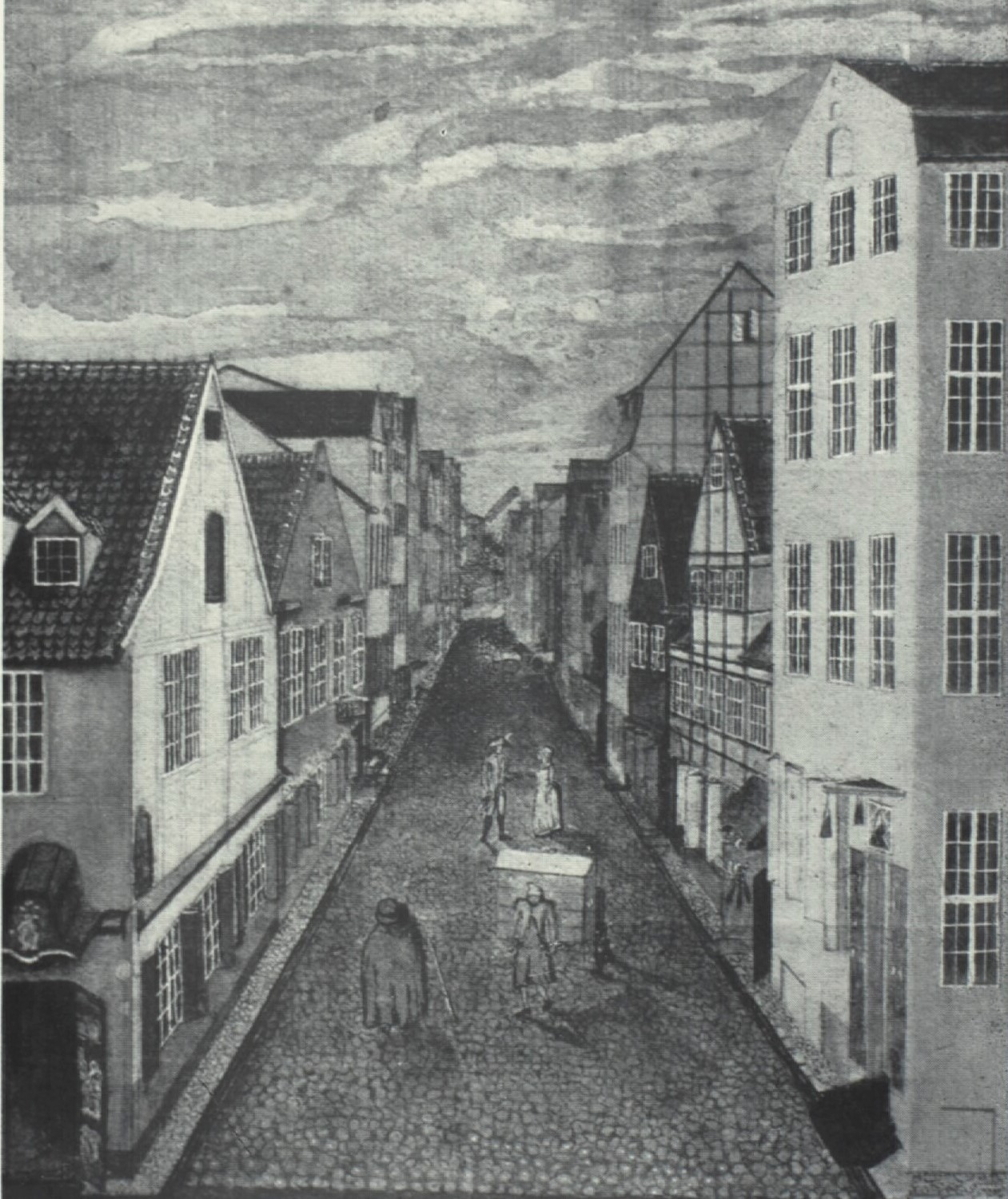
Lavendelstræde

The street received its name in 1609. It from the area close to the city's central square Gammeltorv to the Gyldenløve Bastion of the West Rampart which followed present-day Vester Voldgade. The name of the street probably refers to the lavender that grew in a small group of herb gardens located next to the rampart.

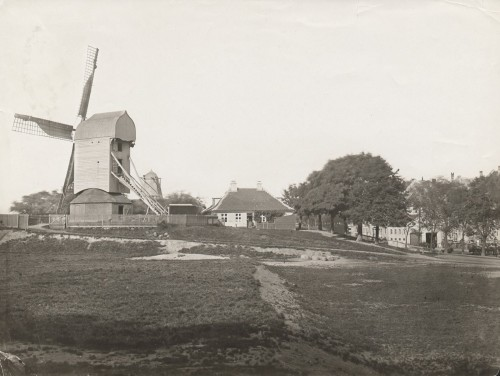
Lavendelstræde Windmill at the far end of the street in 1875

The street was completely destroyed in the Copenhagen Fire of 1795. Its buildings were rebuilt over the next few years, and a new combined townhall and courthouse was built at its beginning, fronting Nytorv.

On the Gyldenløve Bastion stood a stub mill, St. Lucy's Windmill (Sankt Lucie Mølle), which was also known as Lavendelstræde Windmill (Lavendelstræde Mølle) after the street. The rampart survived until 1885. The windmill was dismantled and rebuilt at Enghavevej.

== Notable buildings ==
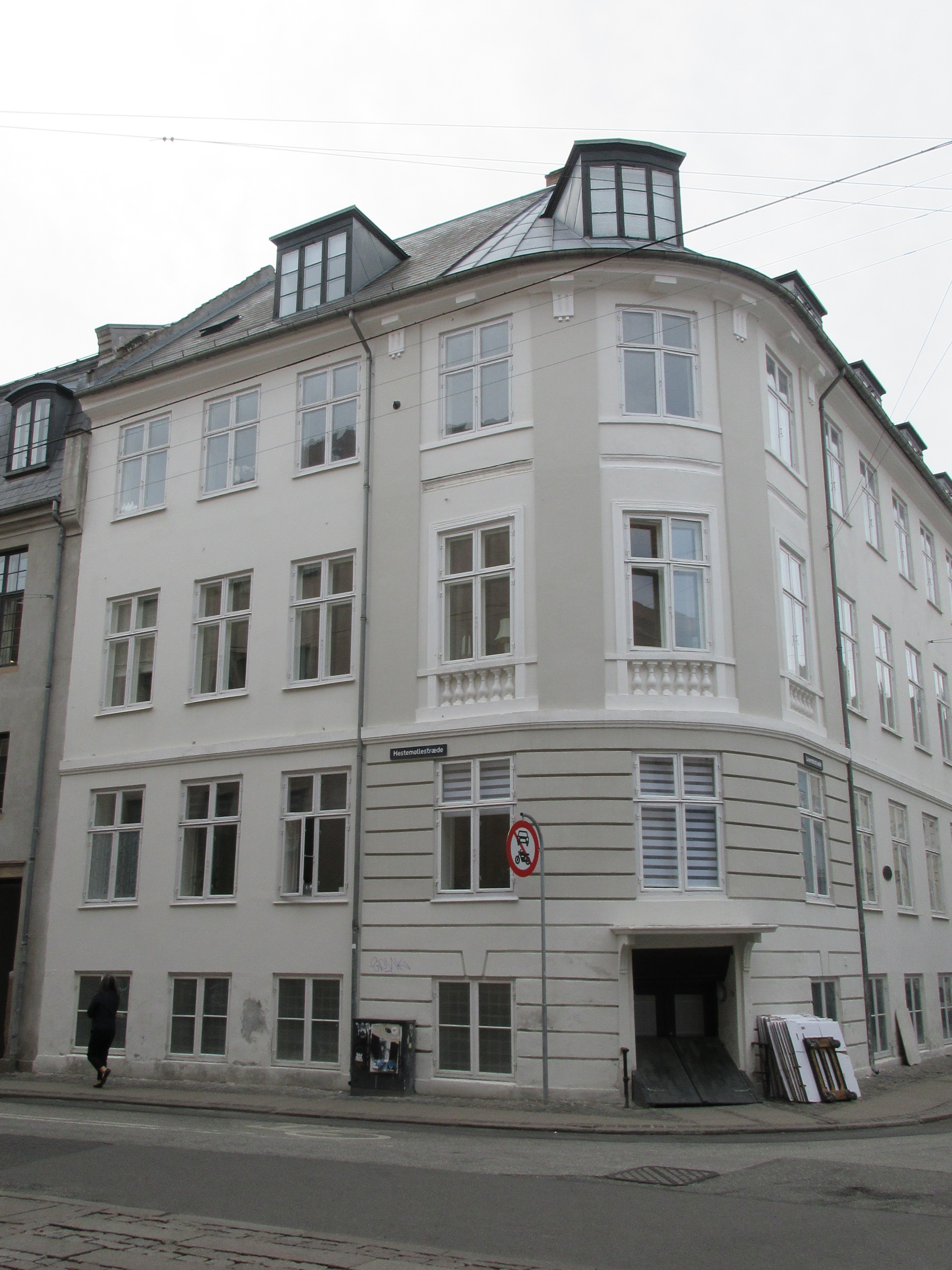
Lavendelstræde 1, on the corner of Hestemøllestræde

Lavendelstræde No. 1, 4–6 and 10 are listed. No. 1, located at the corner with Hestemøllestræde, dates from dates from 1806 to 1807. It was expanded with five bays in 1892–93. Constanze Mozart lived in the corner apartment on first floor in the years 1812–1820 with her second husband, the Danish diplomat Georg Nicolaus Nissen. The widow of Wolfgang Amadeus Mozart, she devoted herself to writing a biography of Mozart with the help of Nissen, although it was not finished until 1829.

The street was destroyed in the Copenhagen Fire of 1795. No. 4–6 are from 1799 and No. 10 is from 1796 to 1797. Taphouse (No. 15) is one of the largest beer bars in the city, offering more than 60 different beers on tap, mainly from Danish and foreign microbreweries.
