= Studiestræde 10 =

Building in Copenhagen, Denmark

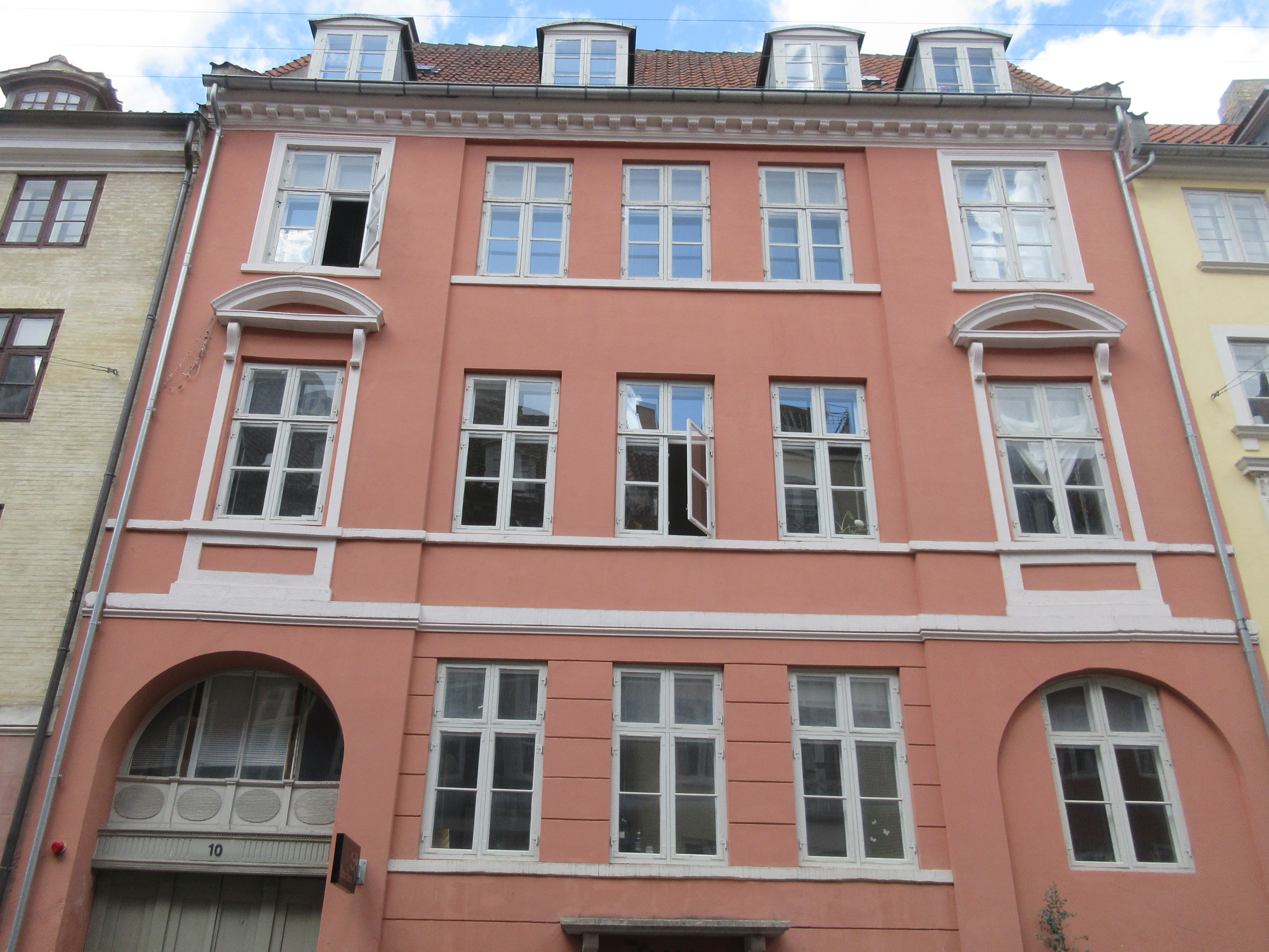
- Interactive map of the Studiestræde 10 area

General information
- Location: Copenhagen, Denmark
- Coordinates: 55°40′44.26″N 12°34′12.79″E
- Completed: 1801

Studiestræde 10 is a Neoclassical property in the Latin Quarter of Copenhagen, Denmark. The building was listed in the Danish registry of protected buildings and places in 1964.

== History ==
Twi snakker houses at the site were destroyed in the Copenhagen Fire of 1795. Master carpenters Christopher Crane & Henrich Kayser completed a property on the merged lots in 1800-1801. It consisted of a three-storey building towards the street and a four-storey building on the other side of the courtyard. Keyser lived with his family in the building. He was a first lieutenant in the civil guard and also a member of Copenhagen Fire Department. In 1809, his tenants were a master painter, a jeweler and a goldsmith who each lived there with their families and a maid.

The property was in 1835 owned by L. Mortensen and at least nine households lived on the four floors. by then. The property was in the 1860s owned by ship broker N. C. Lassen who lived at No. 13. The decoration painter Georg Christian Hilker was among the residents in 1867-68. A grocer's shop had by then opened in the basement.

A cork factory named Aaberg & Bergs was in the 1870 and 1880s based in the building. Berg lived with his family on the third floor in the rear wing. The cement factory Cimbria had an office on the ground floor. N. C. Lassen's kept the property after her husband's death in circa 2880.

Master painter Frederik A. Møller acquired the building in around 1900. He occupied the two lower floors of the front building.

The University of Copenhagen purchased the building for DKK 150,000 in 1942. It was one of several properties in the street acquired by the university in the early 1940s to allow for a future extension of its premises.

An antiquarian bookshop had opened in the basement in 1933. It was from 1939 operated under the name Bog-Børsen by a new owner. Bog-Børsen was from 1937 owned by Kristian Andersen. The politician Per Hækkerup lived in the apartment of the second floor in the mid 1940s.

The university's Institute of Criminology was from 1960 based on the first floor. The premises were later taken over by the Institute of Public Management (Institut for Forvaltningslæree). Part of the Institute of Economy has also been based in the building.

The rear wing was demolished in the late 1970s. The university sold Studiestræde 10 and Studiestræde 8 in circa 2007. The new owners renovated the building in 2011.

== Architecture ==
Studiestræde 10 consists of three storeys over a raised cellar and is five bays wide. The two outer bays are wider and slightly projecting compared to the three central ones. An arched gateway is located in the left hand side of the building and the window in the ground floor's fifth bay is placed in an arched niche.

== See also ==
- Studiestræde 15
