= Larsbjørnsstræde =

Street in Copenhagen, Denmark

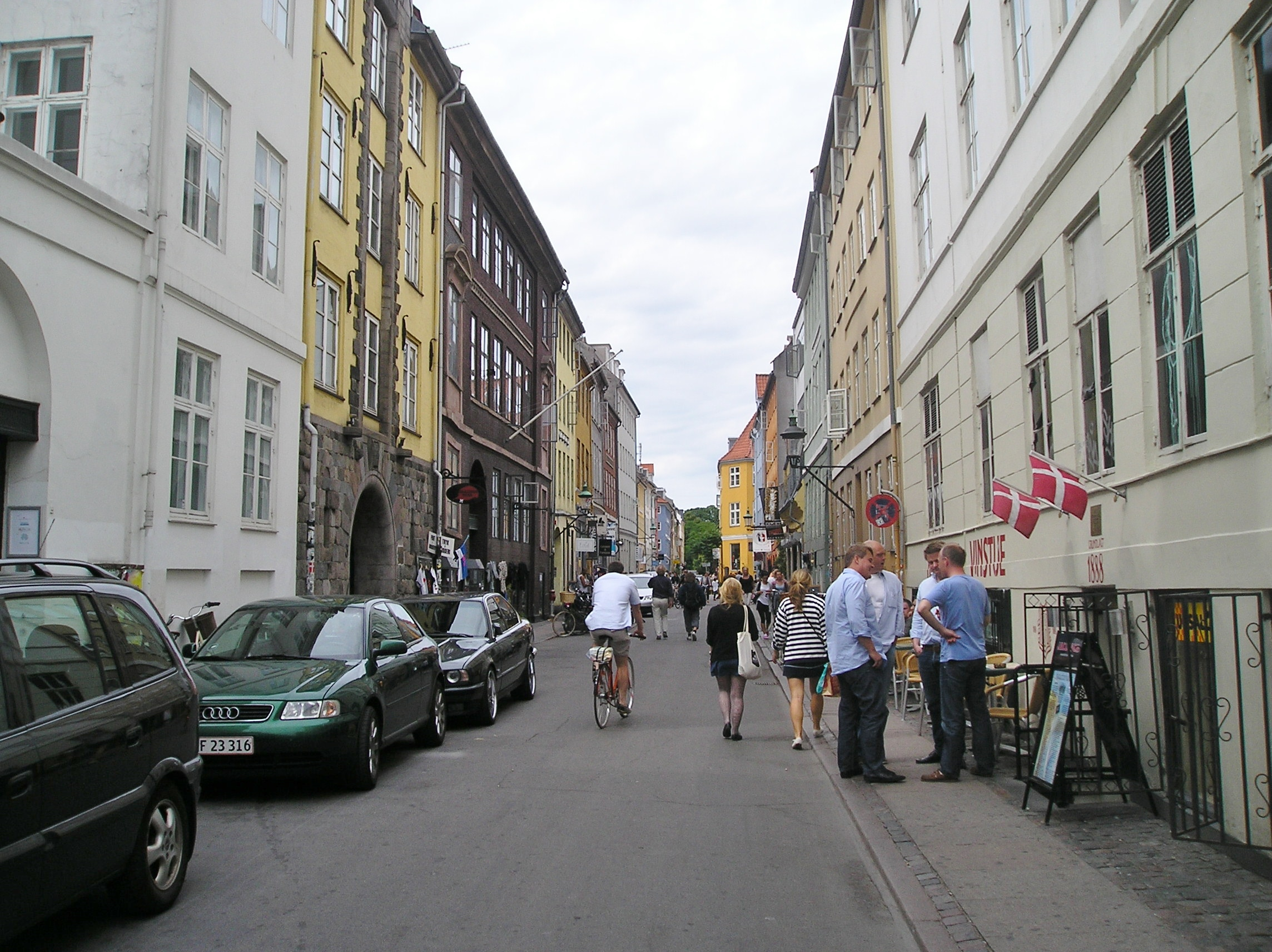
- Length: 178 m (584 ft)
- Location: Copenhagen, Denmark
- Quarter: City centre
- Nearest metro station: Nørreport
- Coordinates: 55°40′42.14″N 12°34′9.99″E
- Southeast end: Vestergade
- Northwest end: Sankt Peders Stræde

Larsbjørnsstræde is a street in the Latin Quarter of central Copenhagen, Denmark. It runs from Vestergade in the south to Sankt Peders Stræde in the north, linking Kattesundet to Teglgårdsstræde. Many of the buildings in the street date from the years after the Copenhagen Fire of 1795 and have been listed on the Danish registry of protected buildings and places.

== History ==
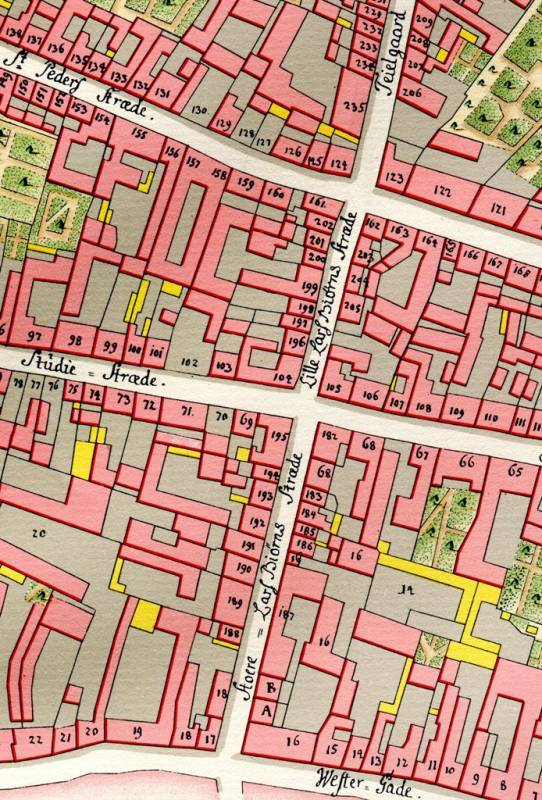
Larsbjørnsstræde seen on Gedde's maf Northern Quarter from 1757

The southern part of the street has existed since at least 1388. It received its current name in around 1460 when a Laurids Bjørnson (Lars Bjørn) owned a property in the street. The street was later extended to Sankt Peders Stræde. The section from Vestergade to Studiestræde was initially called Store Larsbjørnsstræde (Great Larsbjørnsstræde) while the section from Studiestræde to Sankt Peders Stræde was called Lille Larsbjørnsstræde (Little Larsbjørnsstræde).

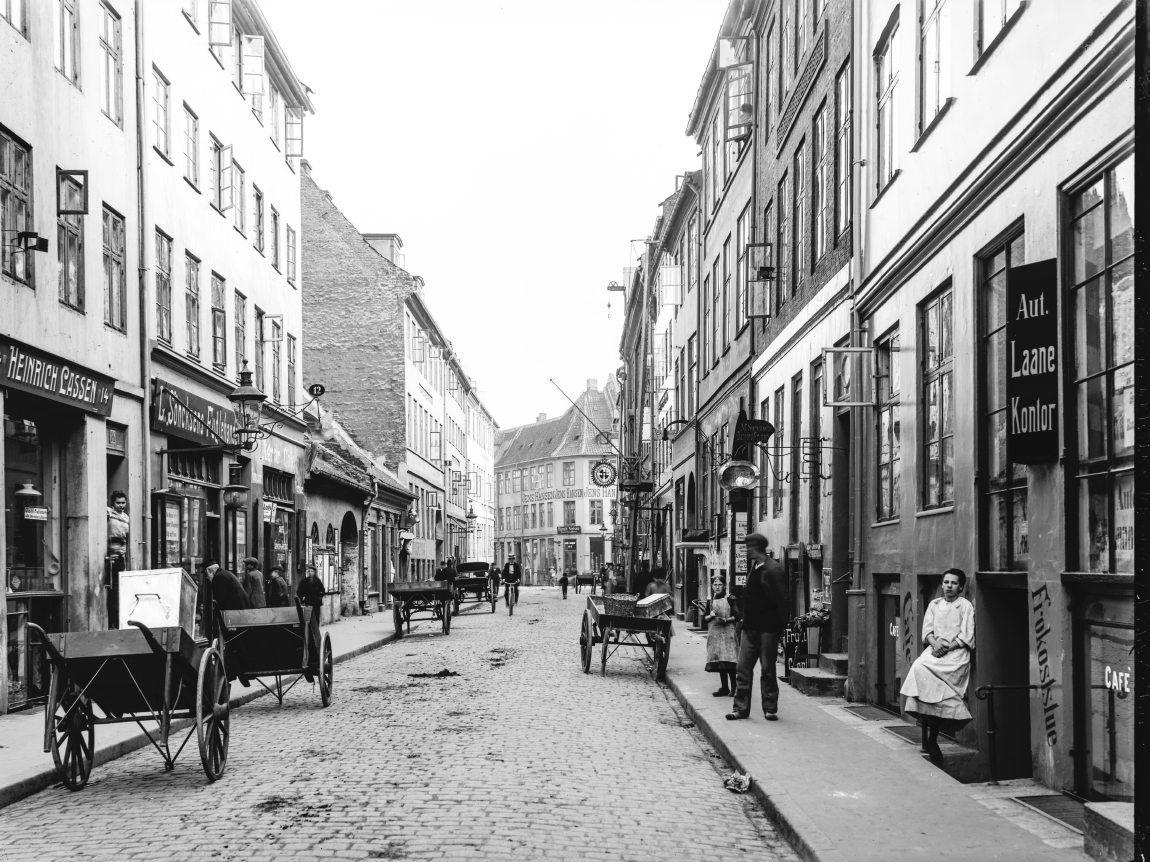
The street photographed by Johannes Hauerslev

Many of the buildings were rear wings associated with properties in the more prominent street Vestergade. Carriages could then arrive through the gateway in Vestergade and exit via a gateway in Larsbjørnsstræde.

Most of the buildings in the street were destroyed in the Copenhagen Fire of 1795 but the buildings were rebuilt over the next few years. Several industrial enterprises opened in the street. Larsbjørnsstræde Sugar Refinery opened at No. 9 in 1803. The owners included Peter Johansen Neergaard.

== Notable buildings and residents ==
No. 5, 6, 7, 11, 13, 14, 16, 17, 18, 19, 21, 23 and 25 are listed on the Danish registry of protected buildings and places.

== Cultural references ==
Larsbjørnsstrædes vinduer (The Windows of Larsbjørnsstræde) is a 1975 album by Troels Trier.

== Image gallery ==
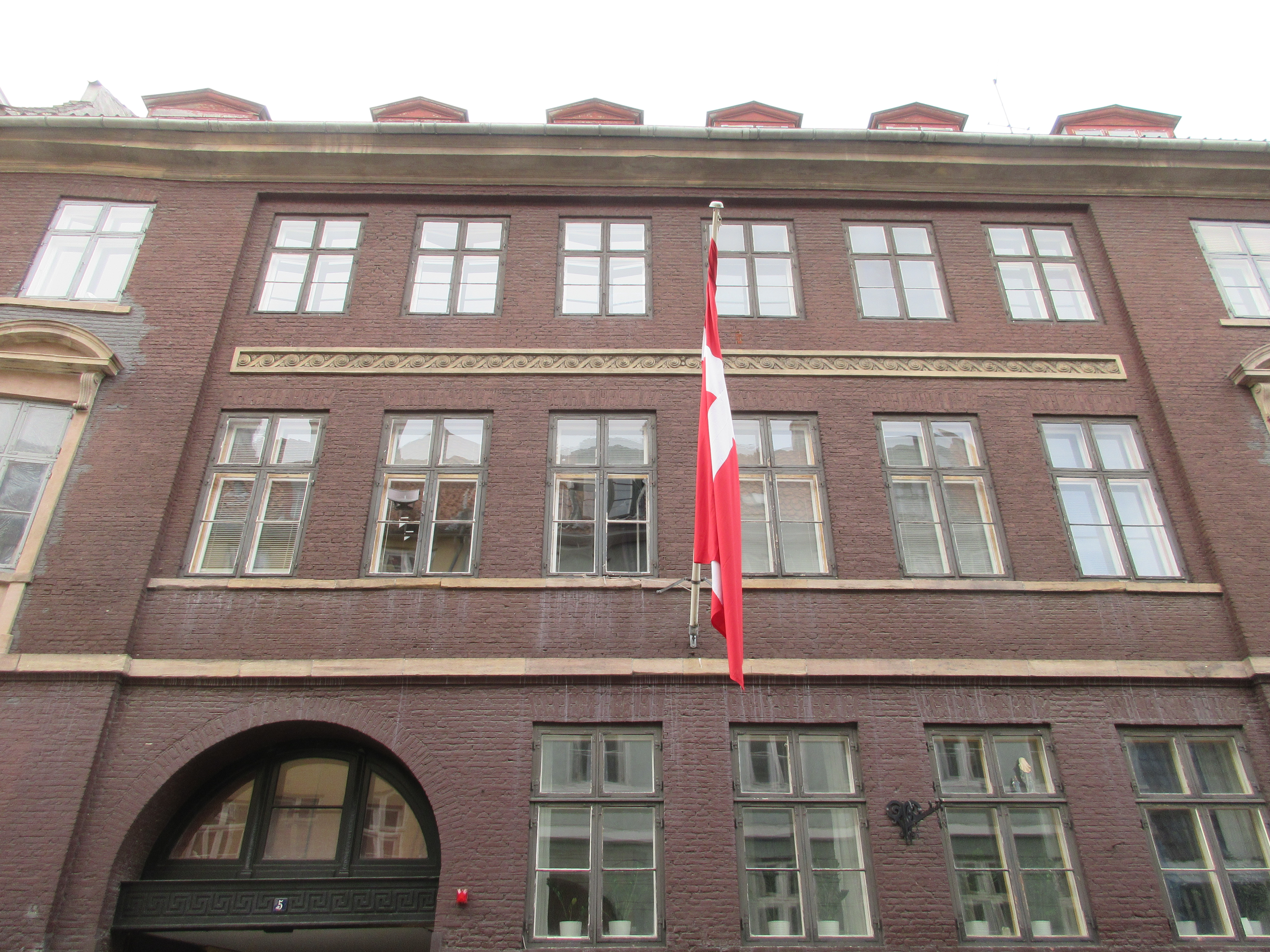
No. 5

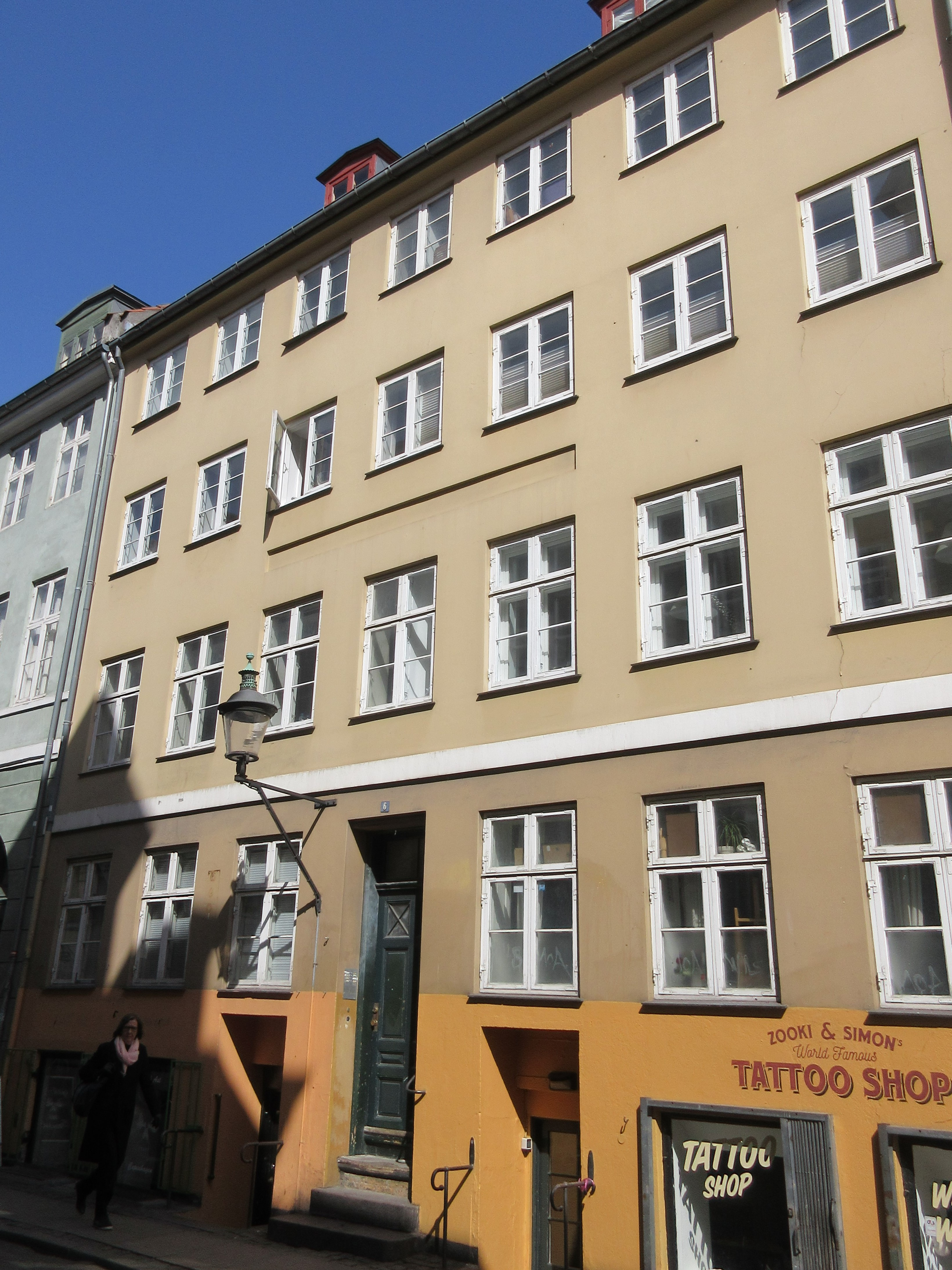
No. 6

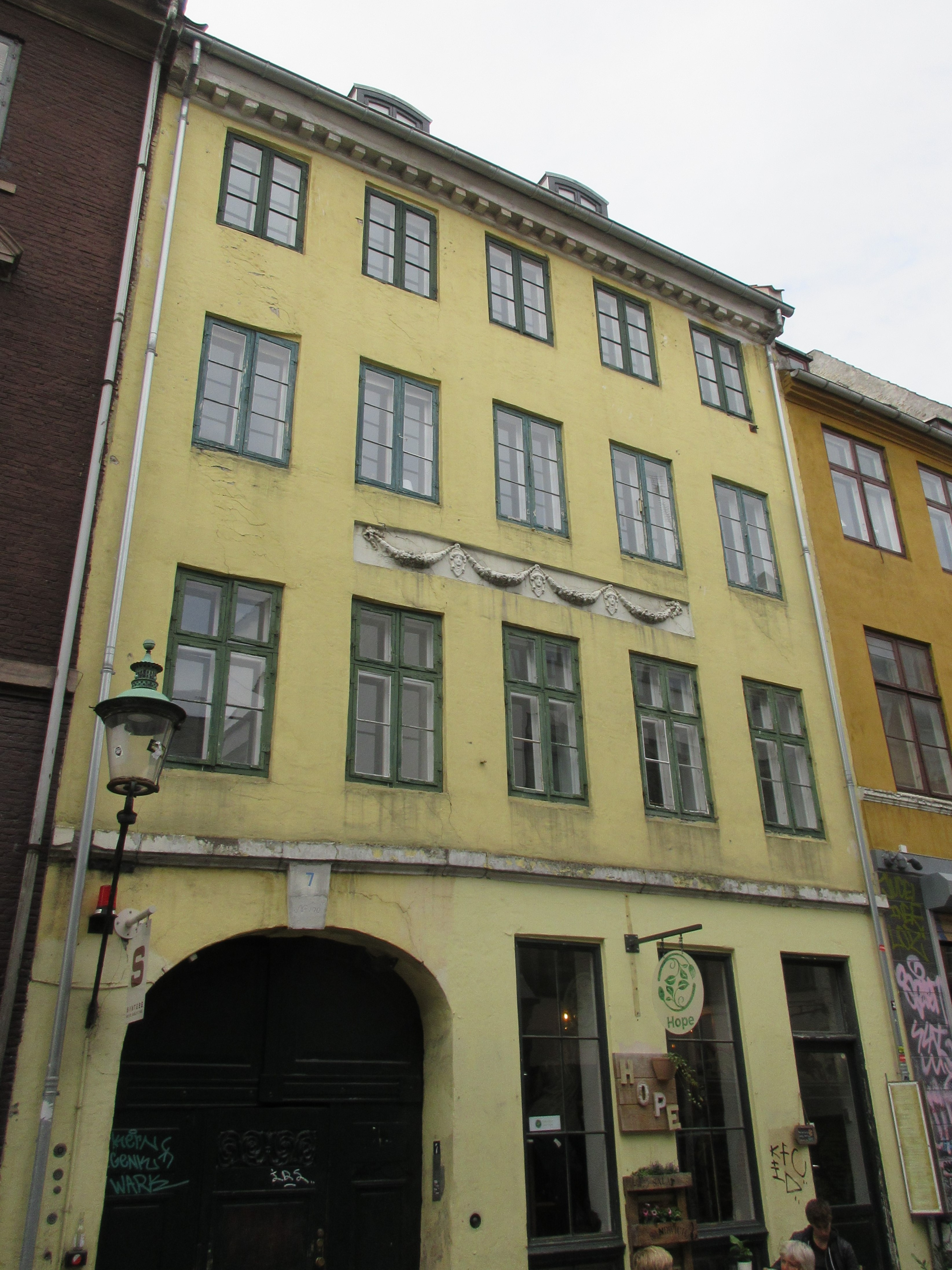
No. 7

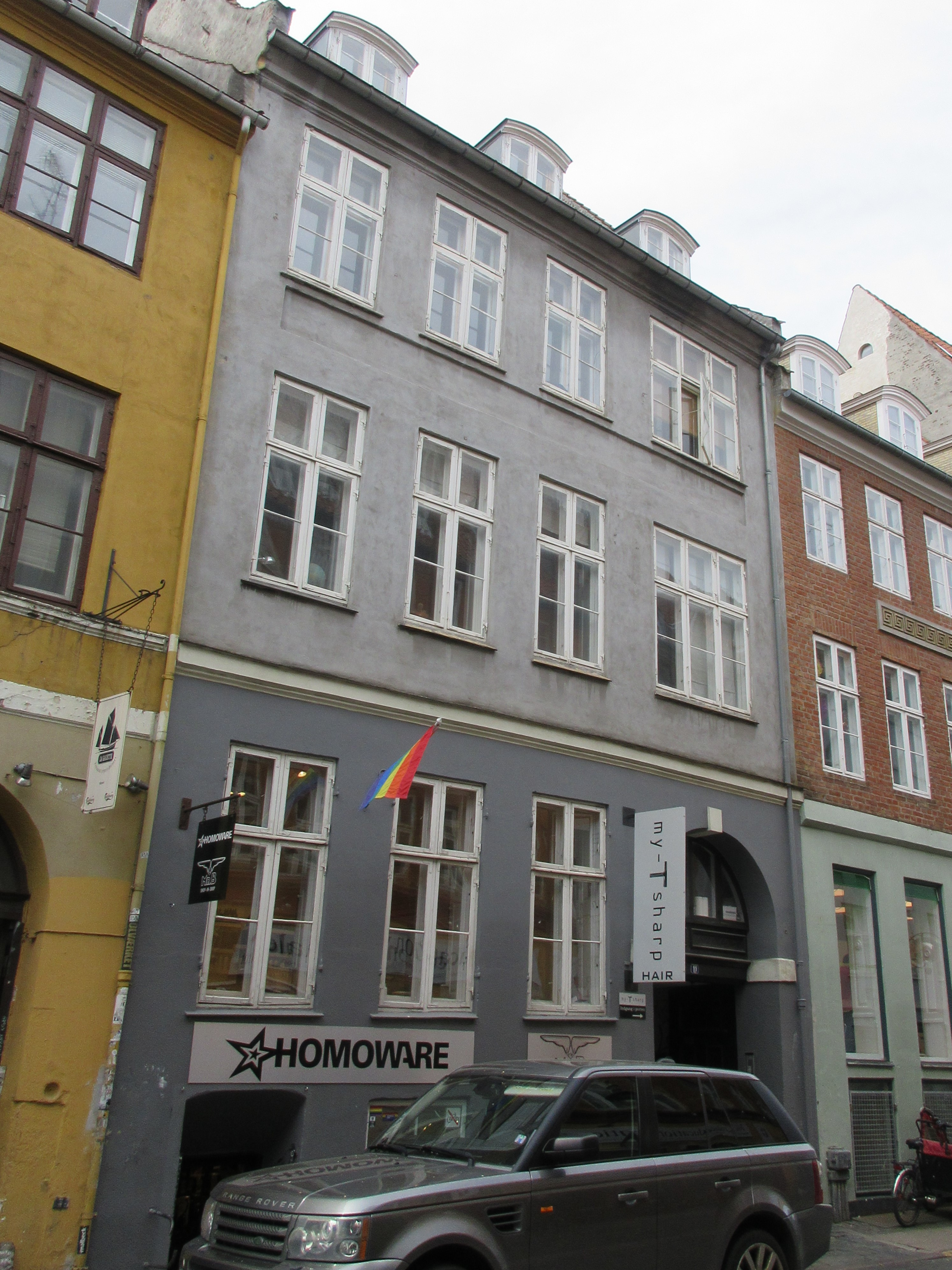
No. 11

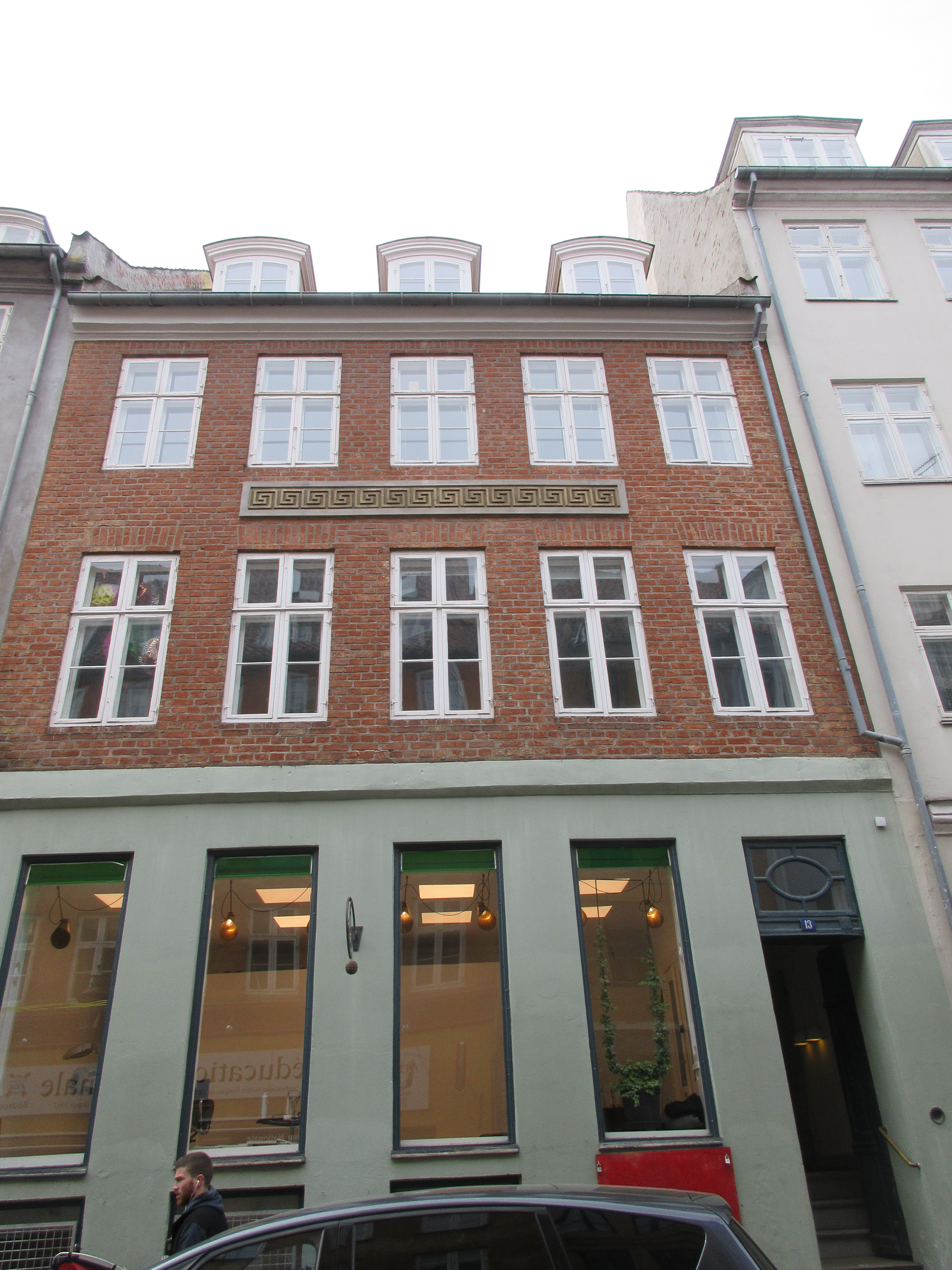
13

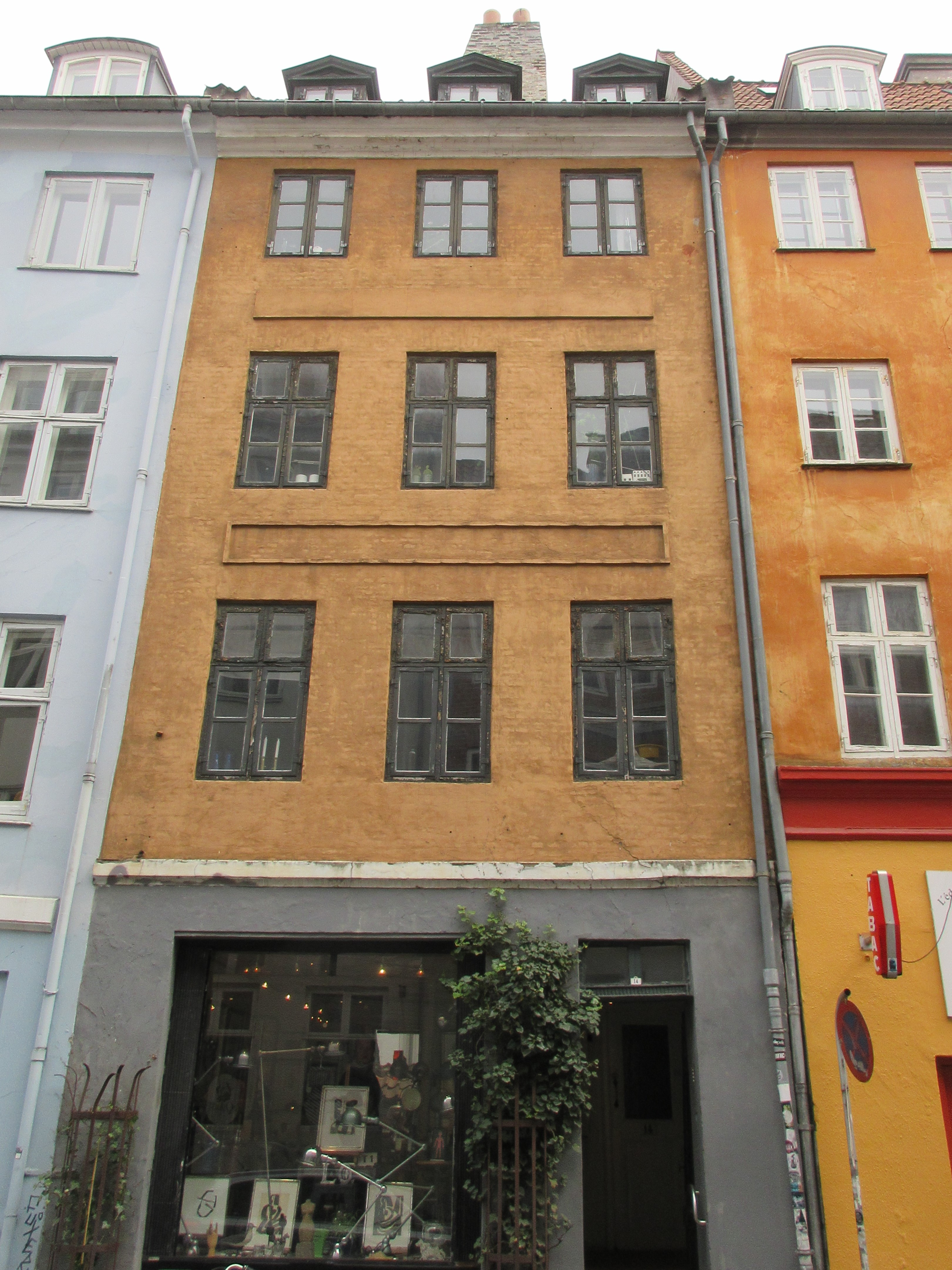
No. 14

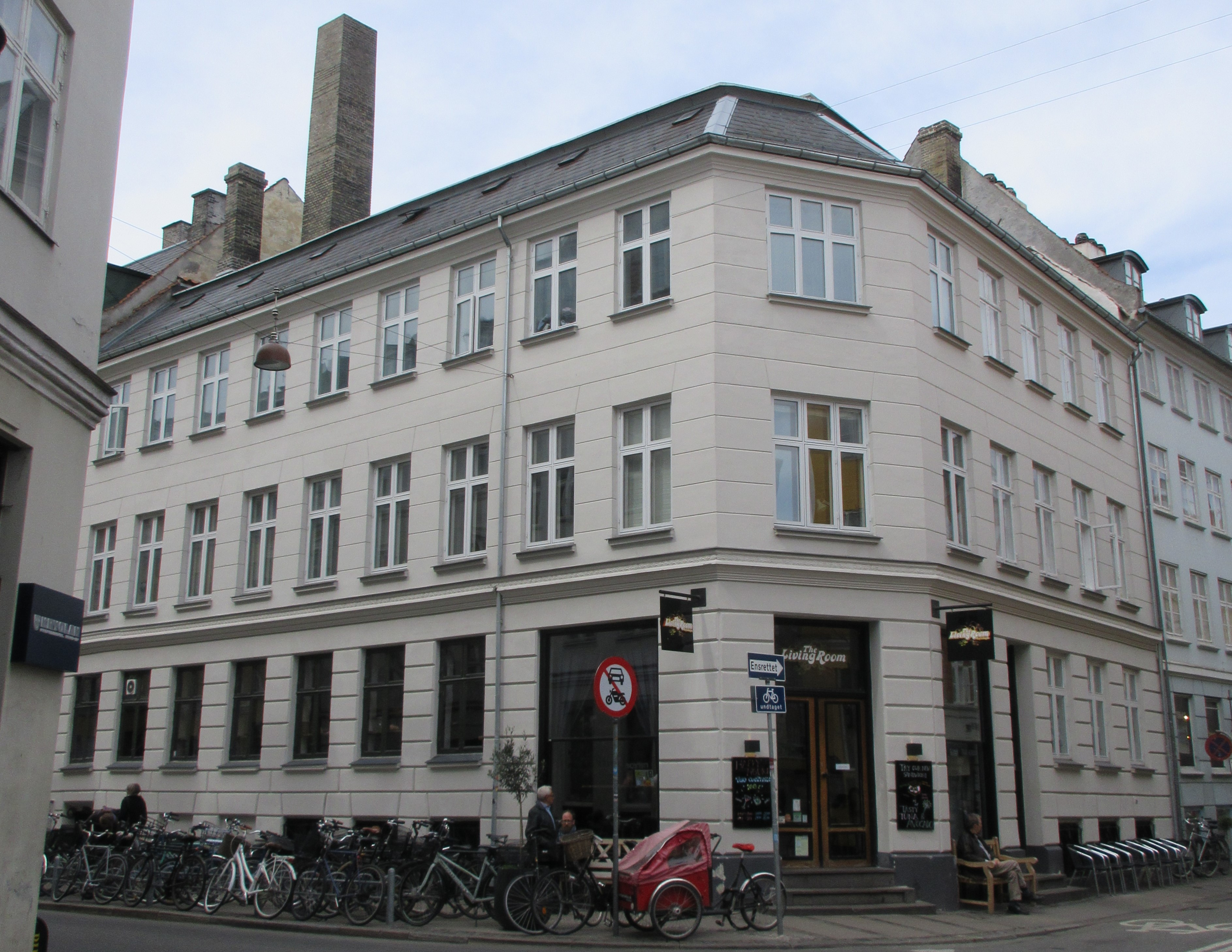
No. 16

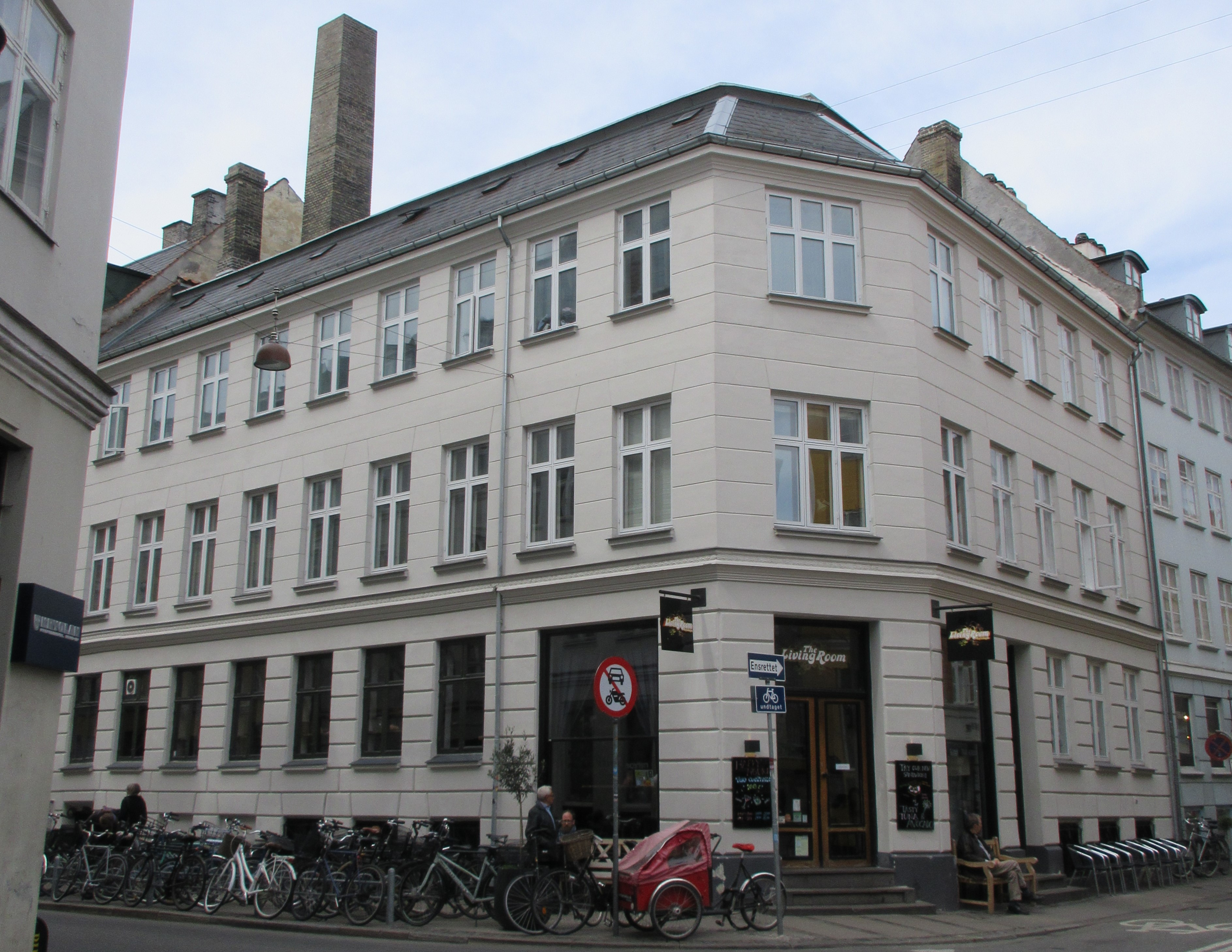
No. 17

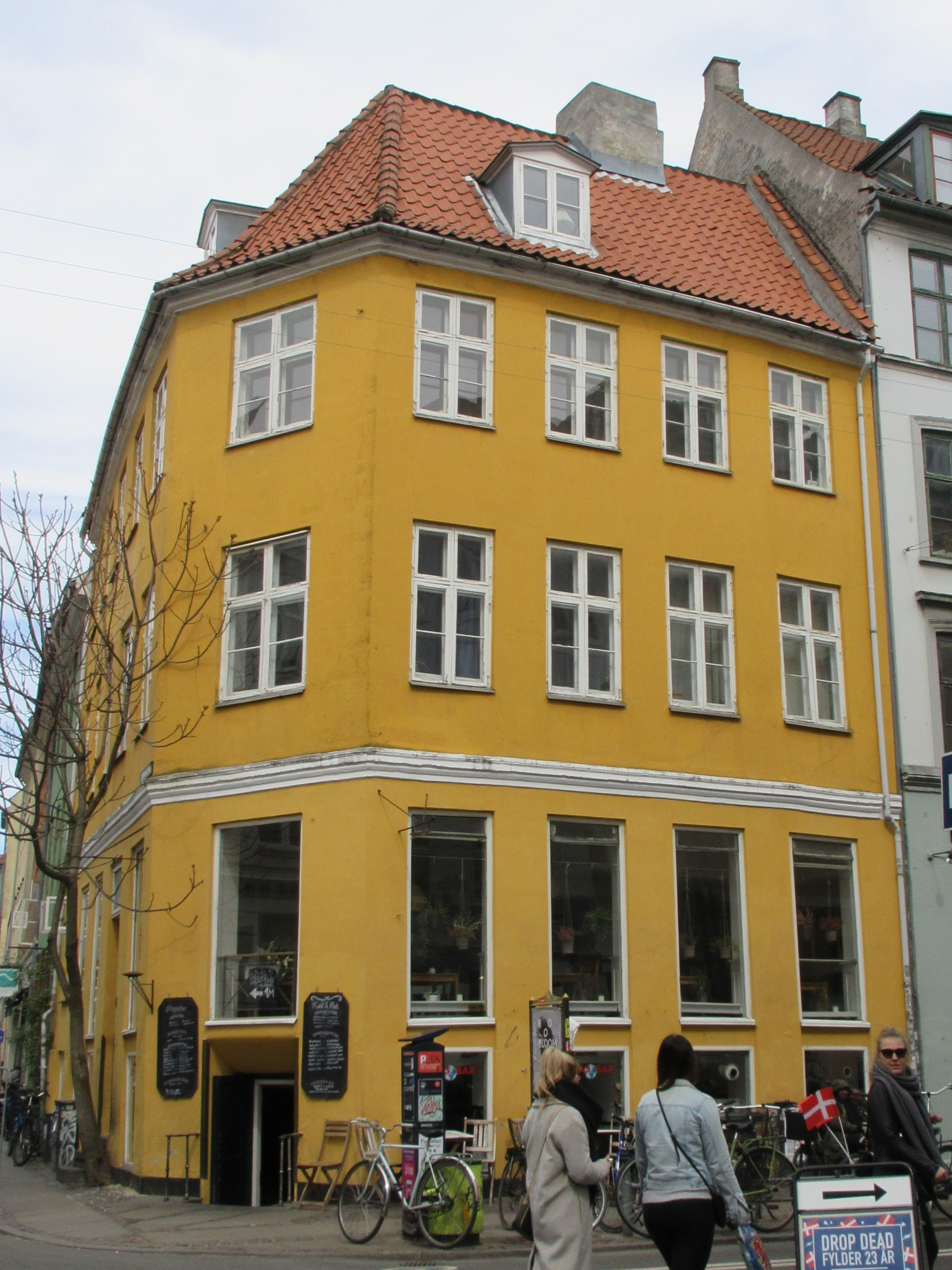
No. 18

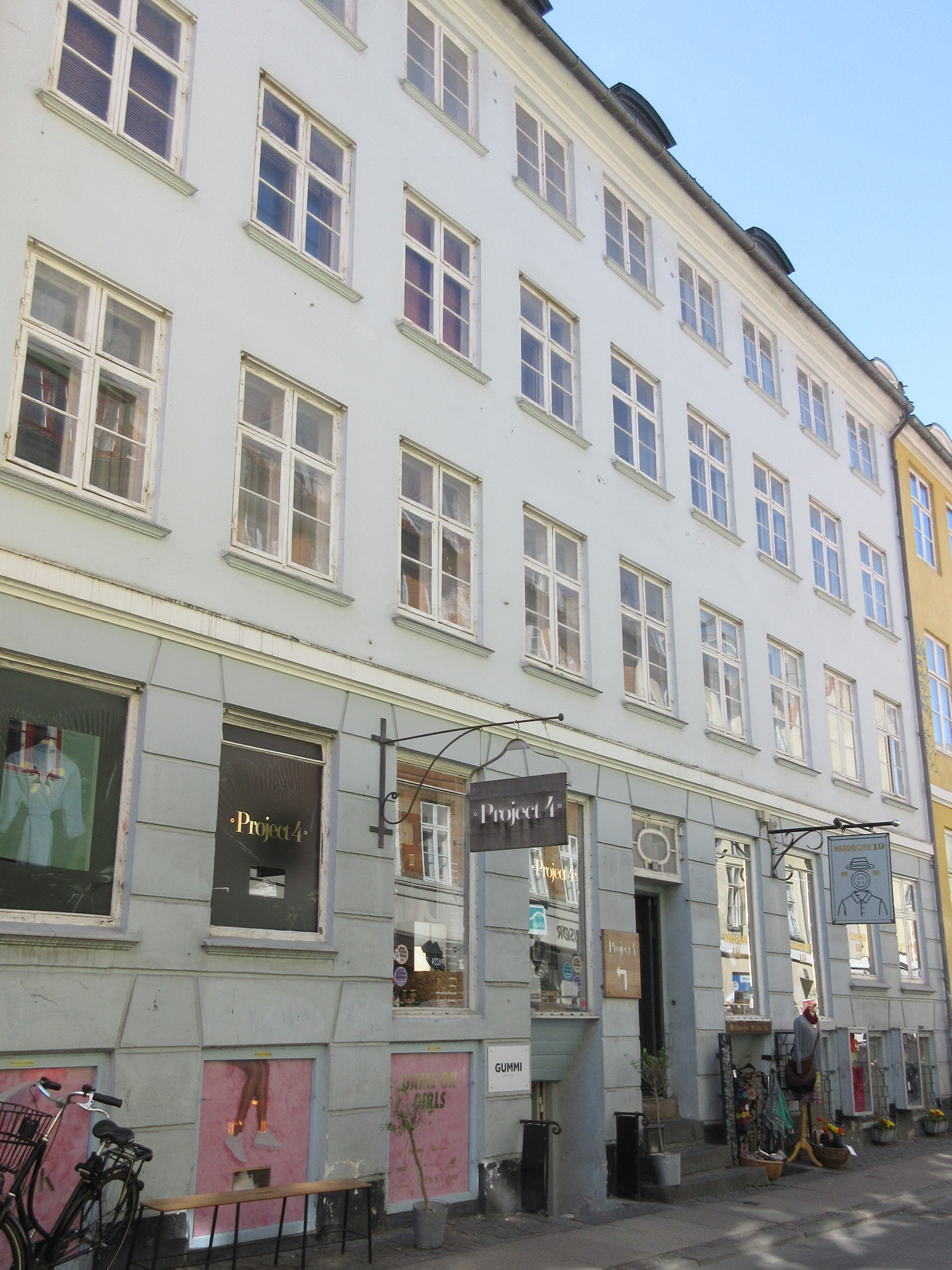
No. 19

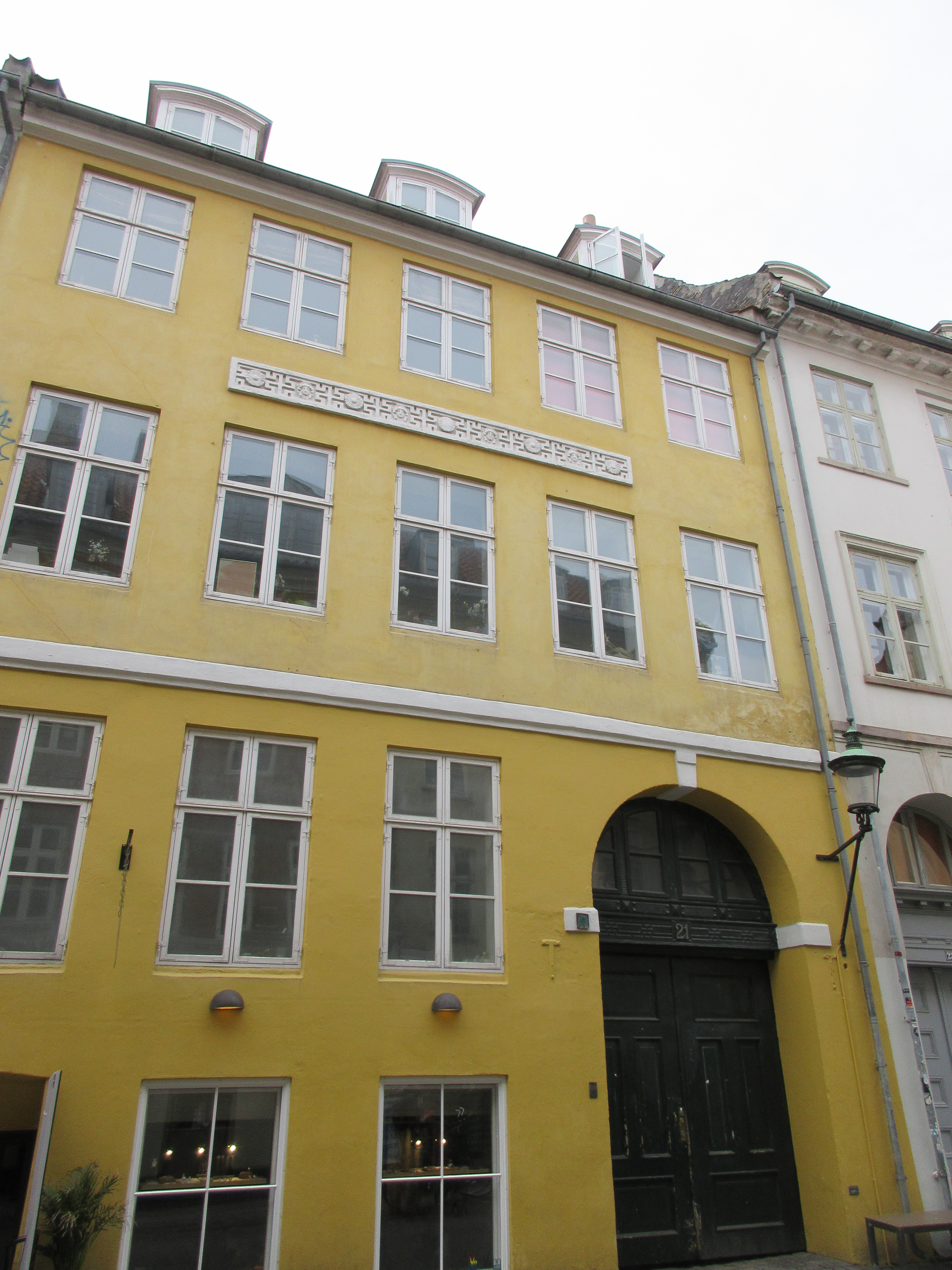
No. 21

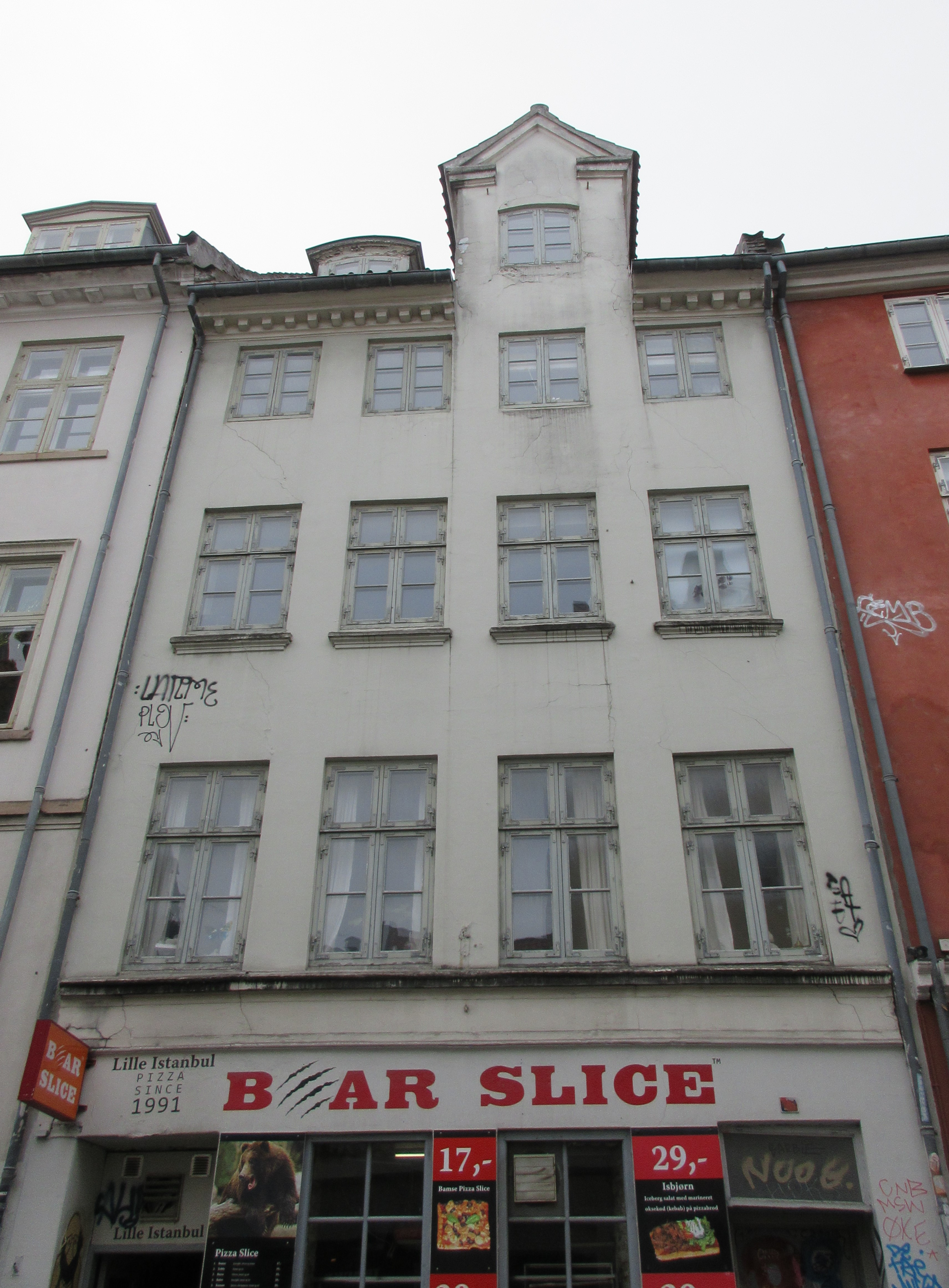
No. 25
