= Old City Hall =

Old City Hall may refer to:

== Asia ==
In Hong Kong

- Old City Hall (Hong Kong)

== Europe ==
In Croatia

- Old City Hall (Zagreb)

In Denmark

- Old City Hall (1479–1728), in Copenhagen
- Old City Hall (1728–1795), in Copenhagen
- Old City Hall (Aalborg)
- Old City Hall (Aarhus)

In Germany

- Old City Hall (Berlin)

In the Netherlands

- Old City Hall (The Hague)

== North America ==
In Canada

- Old City Hall (Guelph)
- Old City Hall (Ottawa)
- Old City Hall (Toronto)

In the United States

- Old City Hall (Mobile, Alabama)
- Old City Hall (Fairbanks, Alaska)
- Old City Hall (Gilroy, California)
- District of Columbia City Hall, Washington, D.C., also known as Old City Hall
- Old City Hall (Boca Raton, Florida)
- Old City Hall (Crystal River, Florida)
- Old City Hall (Fort Wayne, Indiana)
- Old City Hall (Davenport, Iowa)
- Old City Hall (Portland, Maine)
- Old City Hall and Engine House, Annapolis, Maryland
- Old City Hall (Boston), Massachusetts
- Old City Hall (St. Charles, Missouri)
- Fort Benton Engine House, also known as Old City Hall (Fort Benton, Montana)
- Old City Hall (Omaha, Nebraska)
- Old City Hall subway station, New York City
- Old City Hall (Elyria, Ohio), listed on the NRHP in Lorain County, Ohio
- Old City Hall (Bradford, Pennsylvania)
- Old City Hall (Lancaster, Pennsylvania)
- Old City Hall (Philadelphia), Pennsylvania
- Old City Hall (Williamsport, Pennsylvania)
- Old City Hall (Knoxville), Tennessee
- Old City Hall (Richmond, Virginia)
- Old City Hall (Bellingham, Washington), now the Whatcom Museum of History and Art
- Old City Hall (Tacoma, Washington)

== See also ==
- Old Town Hall (disambiguation)
- Old Government House (disambiguation)
