= Benzonsdal =

Danish historic manor house

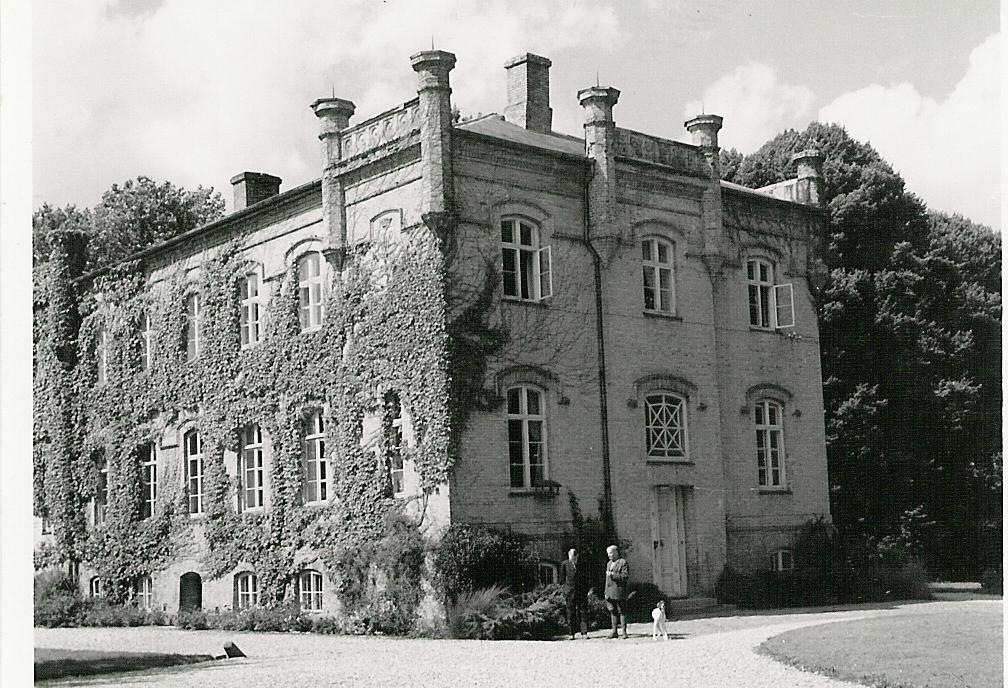
- Vomtahe photo of Benzonsdal
- Interactive map of the Benzonsdal area

General information
- Architectural style: Late Neoclassical
- Location: Ishøj Municipality, Denmark
- Coordinates: 55°37′22.57″N 12°15′19.82″E
- Construction started: 1802
- Renovated: 1856

Benzonsdal is a manor house located at Torslunde, south of Taastrup, in the northern part of Ishøj Municipality, some 20 kilometres west of central Copenhagen, Denmark. It has been owned by members of the noble Lerche family since 1853. The main building is from 1856.

== History ==
=== Benzon family ===
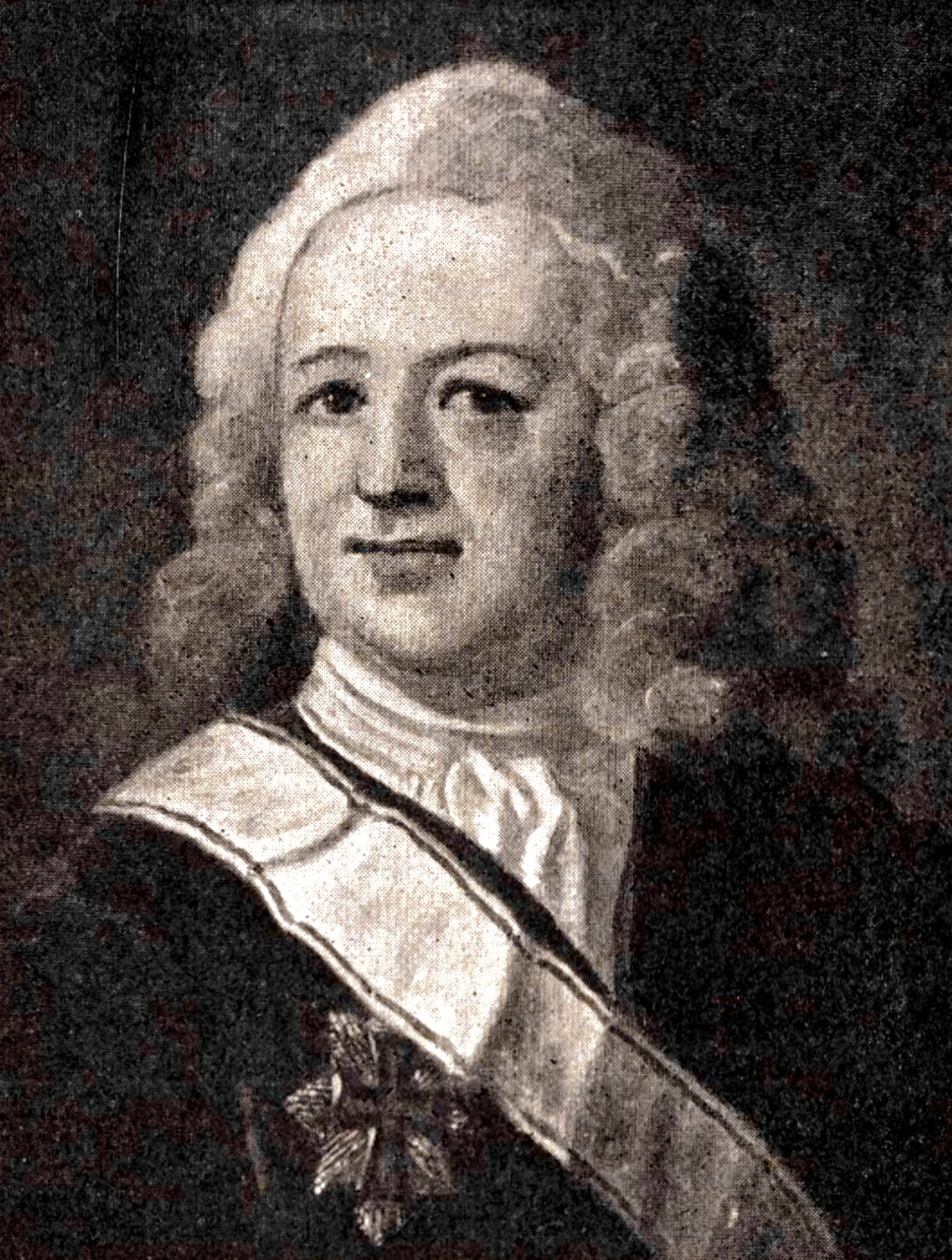
Jacob Benzon

Benzonsdal was established by Supreme Court justice Peder Benzon in 1730 from land that had until then belonged to Gjeddesdal. The aim was to secure a more simple and efficient management of the land. Benzon was a major landowner who also established the manors of Benzonseje (now Risbyholm), Dønnerup and Gislingegård. He had previously also been the owner of Hagestedgaard and Alslevgård. The new manor comprised 50 tenant farms, 100 smallholdings, a brickyard and four watermills.

One of Peder Benzon's brothers, Lars Benzon, bought Benzonsdal from the heirs after Peder Benzon's death in 1735. In 1740, he sold the estate to a third brother, Jacob Benzon.

=== Changing owners, 1744-1853 ===
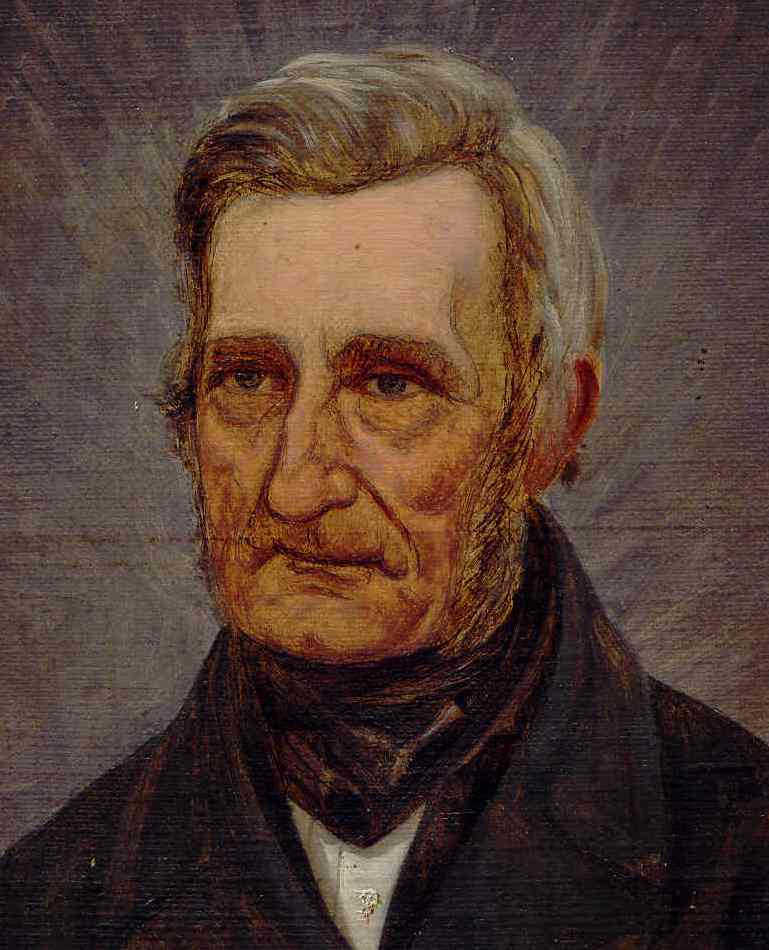
Frederik Mathias Barfred

In 1757, Benzonsdal was acquired by the Copenhagen-based wine merchant Frederik Barfred. He owned the property at Rådhusstræde 1 in Copenhagen and leased the tavern in the basement of Copenhagen City Hall. He served both as one of the directors of Kjøbenhavns Brandforsikring and as one of Copenhagen's 32 Men. Barfred wanted to ensure that the estate would stay in the family and therefore created a so-called stamhus in 1765 with the effect that it could neither be sold, margaged or divided between heirs. Stamhuset Benzonsdal was, however, already dissolved in 1786 and the estate was then sold to his son Jens Laurits Barfred. In 1797, he also purchased Gjeddesdal. In the 1780s, Barfred sold the tenant farms off to the farmers in accordance with the agricultural reforms of the time. In 1800, he sold the rest of the estate to Niels de Bang and Christian Ulrich Detlev von Eggers. Niels de Bang, who after a while had become the sole owner of Benzonsdal, made a big effort to assist the sick and poor farmers on his estate during an outbreak of dysentery.

=== 1853-present: The Lerche family ===
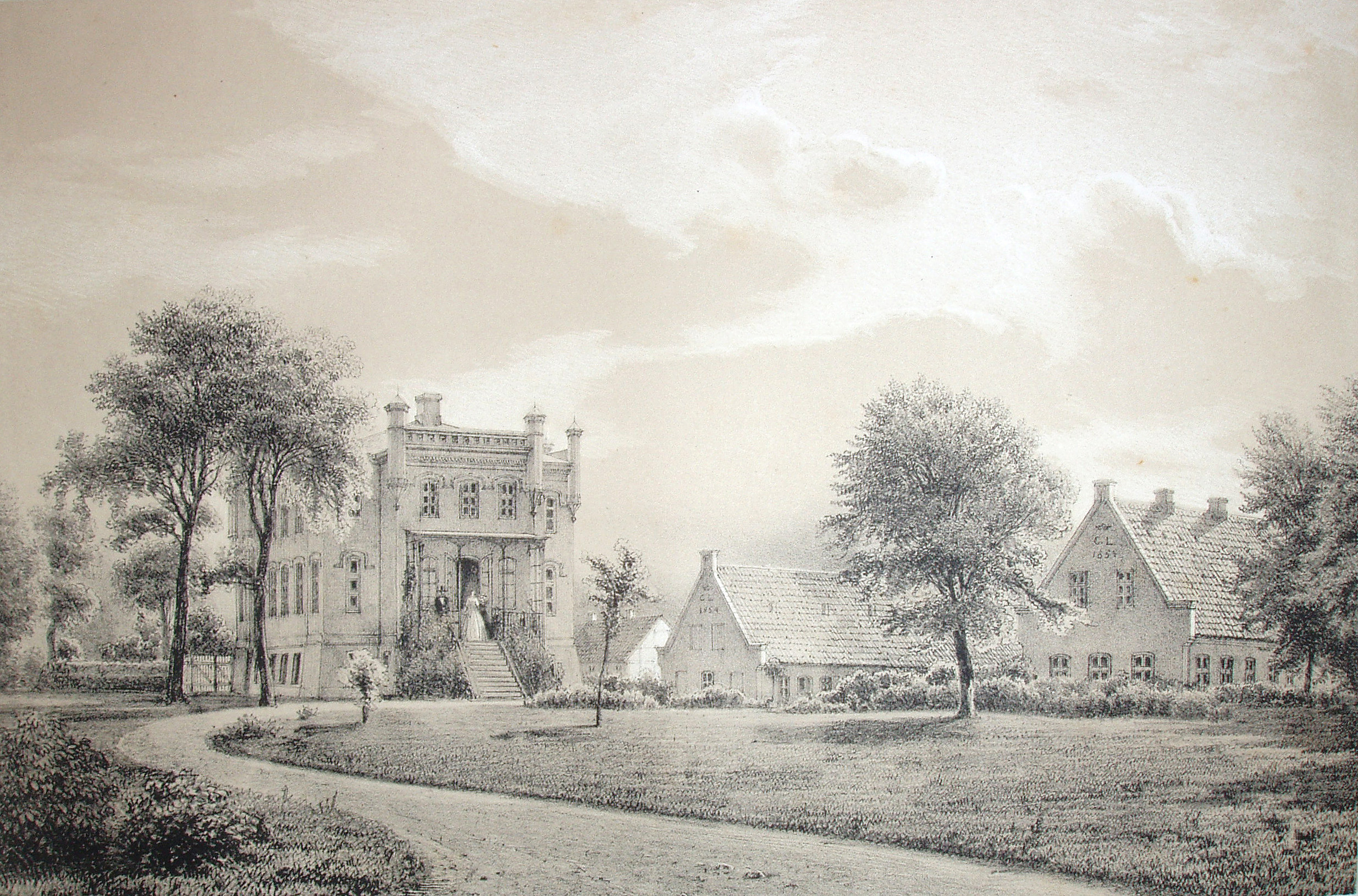
Benxonsdal's new main building painted by Ferdinand Richardt

Count Carl Christian Cornelius Lerche bought Benzonsdal in 1853 and constructed a new main building in 1856.

== Architecture ==
The main building is from 1856. It consists of two storeys over a high cellar. It is built in yellow brick and has a slate roof..

== Estate ==
The house is located in the middle of a scenic garden. A tree-lined avenue leads up to the house.

The estate covers 447 hectares of which 38 hectares have been leased. 409 hectares are farmland.

== Cultural references ==
In the late 1960s, Benzonsdal has been used as a location in two Danish adaptions of The Famous Five novels, De fem og spionerne (1969) and De fem i fedtefadet (1970). It was also used as a location in Thomas Vinterberg's 2013 drama film The Hunt.

== List of owners ==
- (1730-1735) Peder Benzon
- (1735-1740) Lars Benzon
- (1740-1744) Jacob Benzon
- (1744-1757) Jens Andresen
- (1757-1786) Frederik Barfred
- (1786-1800) Jens Lauritz Barfred
- (1800- ) Chr. Ulrich Detlev von Eggers
- (1800-1806) Niels de Bang
- (1806-1807) Peder Bech
- (1807-1853) Frederik Mathias Barfred
- (1853-1881) Carl Chr. Cornelius Lerche
- (1881-1890) Sophie Frederikke Steensen, gift Lerche
- (1890-1918) Carl Chr. Baron Lerche
- (1918-1944) Carl Chr. Cornelius Lerche
- (1918- 1966) Vincens Chr. Lerche
- (1966-1998) Carl Chr. Frederik Lerche
- (1991-2012) Vincens Carl Chr. Lerche
- (2012-present) Chr. Cornelius Lerche
