= Brøndumgård =

Brøndum House
- Brøndumhus
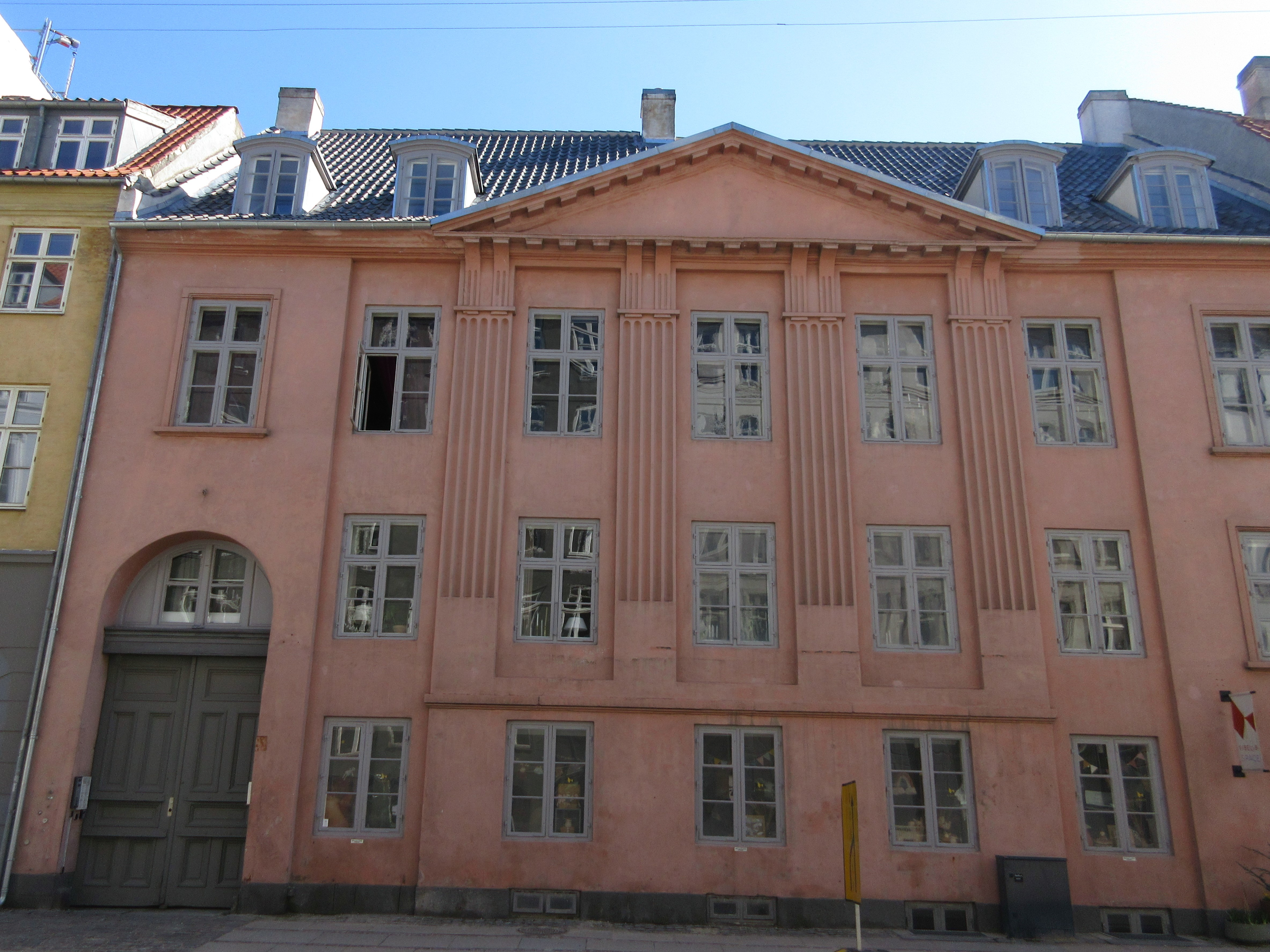
- Interactive map of the Brøndum House area

General information
- Location: Copenhagen, Denmark
- Coordinates: 55°41′13.2″N 12°35′24.97″E
- Completed: 1804

Brøndumgård is a Neoclassical town mansion from 1804 situated at Store Kongensgade 110 in central Copenhagen, Denmark. It was listed in the Danish registry of protected buildings and places in 1918. Changing breweries or distilleries were from the beginning of the 18th century until 1918 operated on the rear of the property. It was from 1842 owned by Anders Brøndum for whom two rear wings, neither of which are listed, were constructed in the 1850s. The entire complex was converted into condominiums in 2007–10.

== History ==
=== 16th and 18th centuries ===
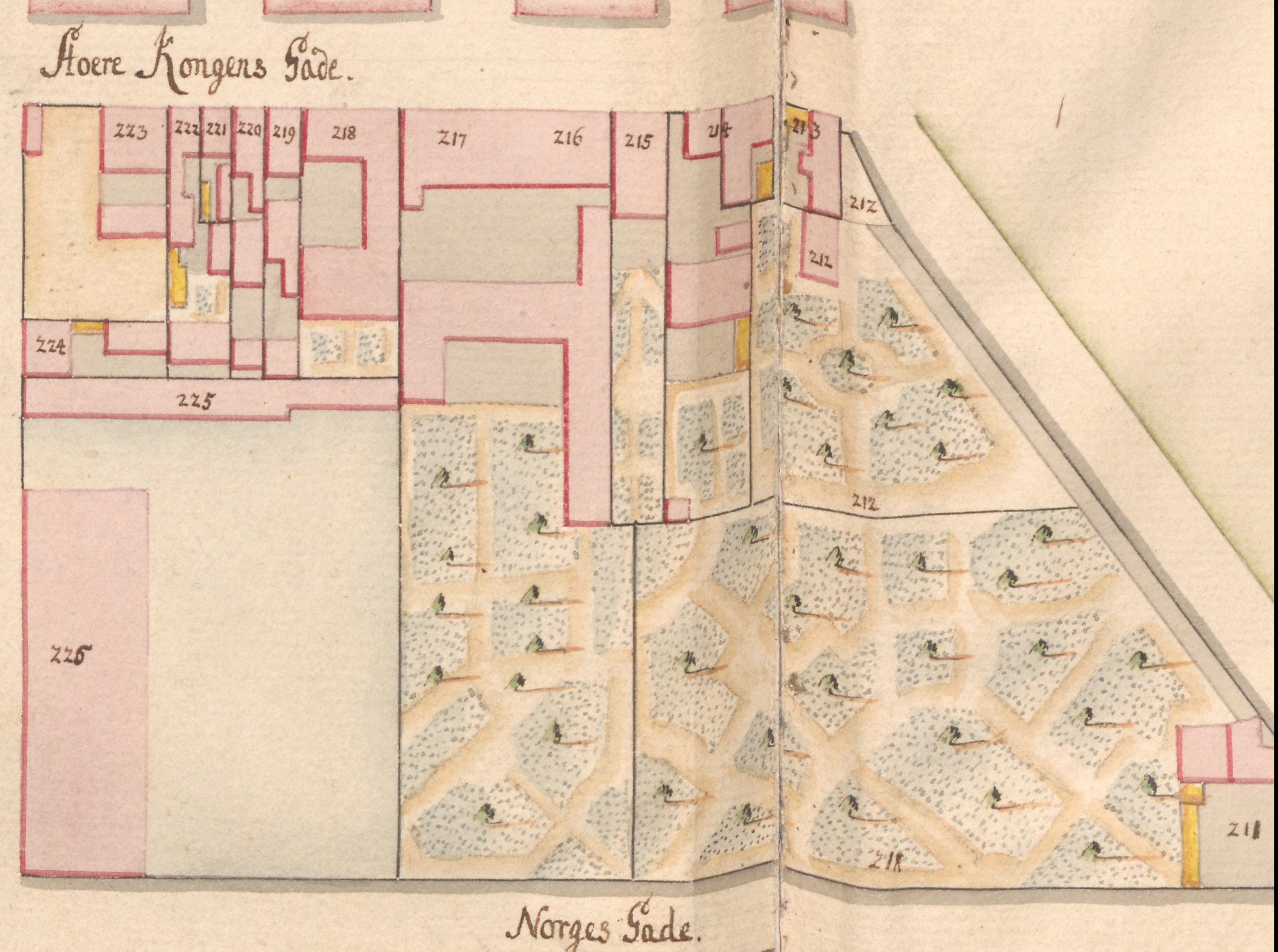
No. 4214 seen on a detail from Christian Gedde's map of St. Ann's East Quarter, 1757.

The area known as New Copenhagen was incorporated into the fortified city in the 1670s. A larger property on the site was listed in Copenhagen's first cadastre of 1756 as No. 115 in St, Ann's East Quarter, owned by a Hofråd Hess. Two small houses connected by a gate were constructed on the site in 1710. The owners of the property operated a brewery in the courtyard up through the 18th century. In 1756, it was owned by a brewer named Lauritz Jørgensen.

The property was listed in the new cadastre of 1756 as No. 214 in St. Ann's East Quarter. It belonged to distiller Lauritz Jørgensen at that time.

=== Barfred and Aller ===
The property was later acquired by the businessman and landowner Jens Laurids Barfred (1756-1823). The present building fronting the site was constructed for him in 1801–. The money came from his recent sale of one of his two estates, Benzonsdal. His other estate Gjeddesdal remained in his possession until 1822. Barfred was hit hard by the economic crisis of the 1810s and went bankrupt in around 1729.

The property was later taken over by Jens Aller. He kept cows on the second floor of the rear wing. The mash from the distillery was used as animal feed for the cows. He was also the owner of large areas used for grazing in the outer Nørrebro area. The brewery was on his death in 1829 passed down to his son Christian Aller. He constructed a new brewery outside the city in 1830. His son was the publisher Carl Aller.

=== Brøndum's Distillery ===
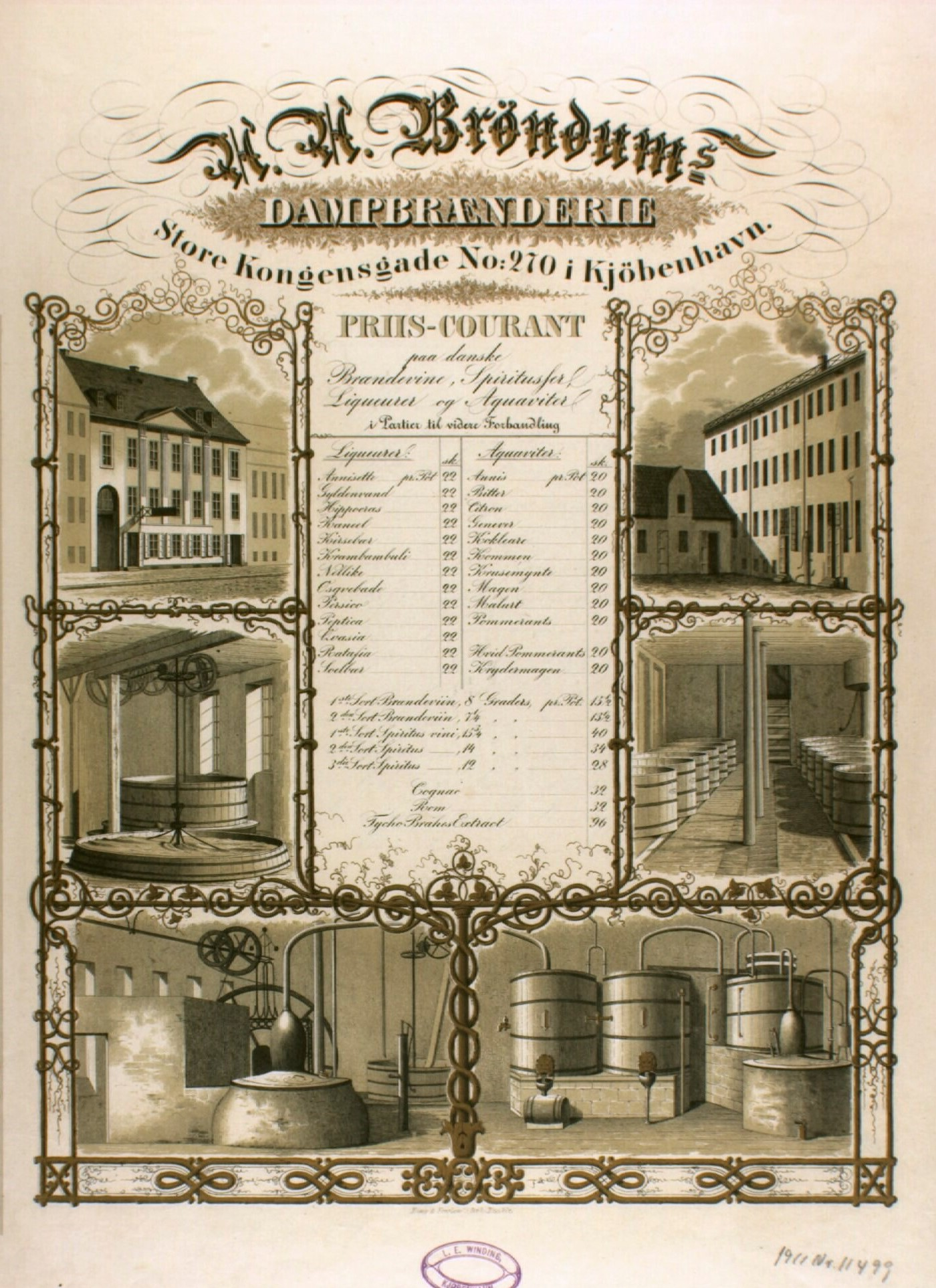
A. A. Bröndums Dampbrænderi

In 1842, Anders Antonsen Brøndum (1791–1861) purchased the property. Anders Brøndum was the younger half-brother of Christen Brøndum. He had owned the distillery Paradis on Store Kongensgade from 1819 and was also the owner of the inns and associated distilleries Roskilde Kro (from 1838), Store Kro in Kongens Lyngby and Bagsværd Kro in Bagsværd. He initially operated the property in Store Kongensgade as a brewery specializing in bavarian beer. In 1844, Brøndum converted the brewery into a distillery and yeast factory.

Brøndum was at the time of the 1845 census residing in the building as a widower with his seven children. The 11-year-old Otto Joachim Moltke, a son of Adam Gottlob Moltke, was living with the family.

The property and associated distillery was upon A, A, Brøndum's death in 1861 passed down to his son Rasmus William Brøndum.

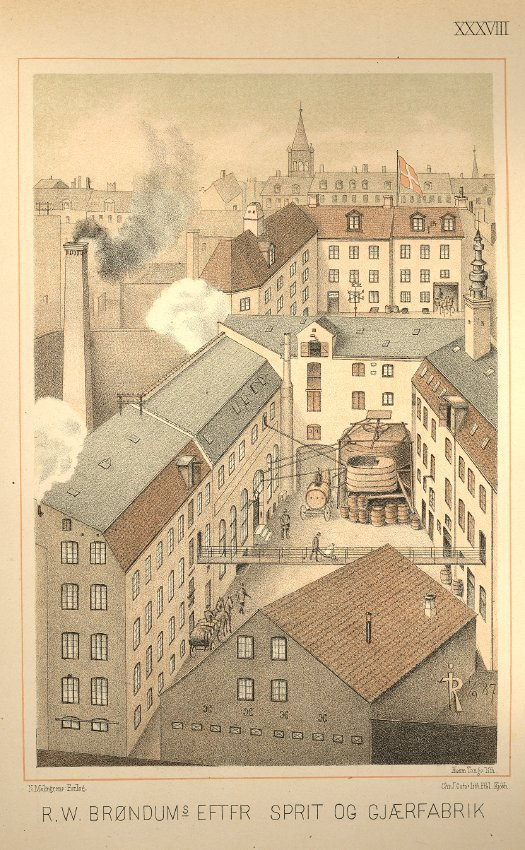
R.W. Brøndums Efterfølgers, 1888

On Rasmus William Brøndum's death in 1874, Store Kongensgade 110 was sold in public auction to Aage Borchhorst. Thorvald Krak, Copenhagen's city engineer, was a resident in one of the apartments in 1874–75. The distillery was continued under the name R.W. Brøndum's Efterfølger (R. W. Brøndum's Successor). Borchhorst modernized the operations. In the 1880s, it was together with Carlsberg one of the first enterprises in Copenhagen to install electricity.

The next owner was Th. Colding. In 1896, R. W. Brøndum's Efterfølger was merged with N. Chr. Syndergaard's Efterfølger (Prinsensgade, founded 1730), ChristianshavnS Spritfabrik (Wildersgade, founded 1825) and J. Wilian & Søn (Vognmagergade, founded 1848) under the name A/S Københavns Spritfabrik. Jens Ormslev's Fabrik in Aarhus (founded 1868) was acquired by the company in 1918. In 1918, Københavns Spritfabrik was itself acquired by Se Danske Spritfabrikker.

=== Later history ===
The building was in 1923 acquired by Mejeriernes Fællesindjøb. Mejeriernes Fællesindkøb was a Group purchasing organization founded in 1901. The company relocated to new premises in 1958.

In 2003, Store Kongensgade 110 was acquired by Fontaine A/S. It was sold in 2012.

== Architecture ==
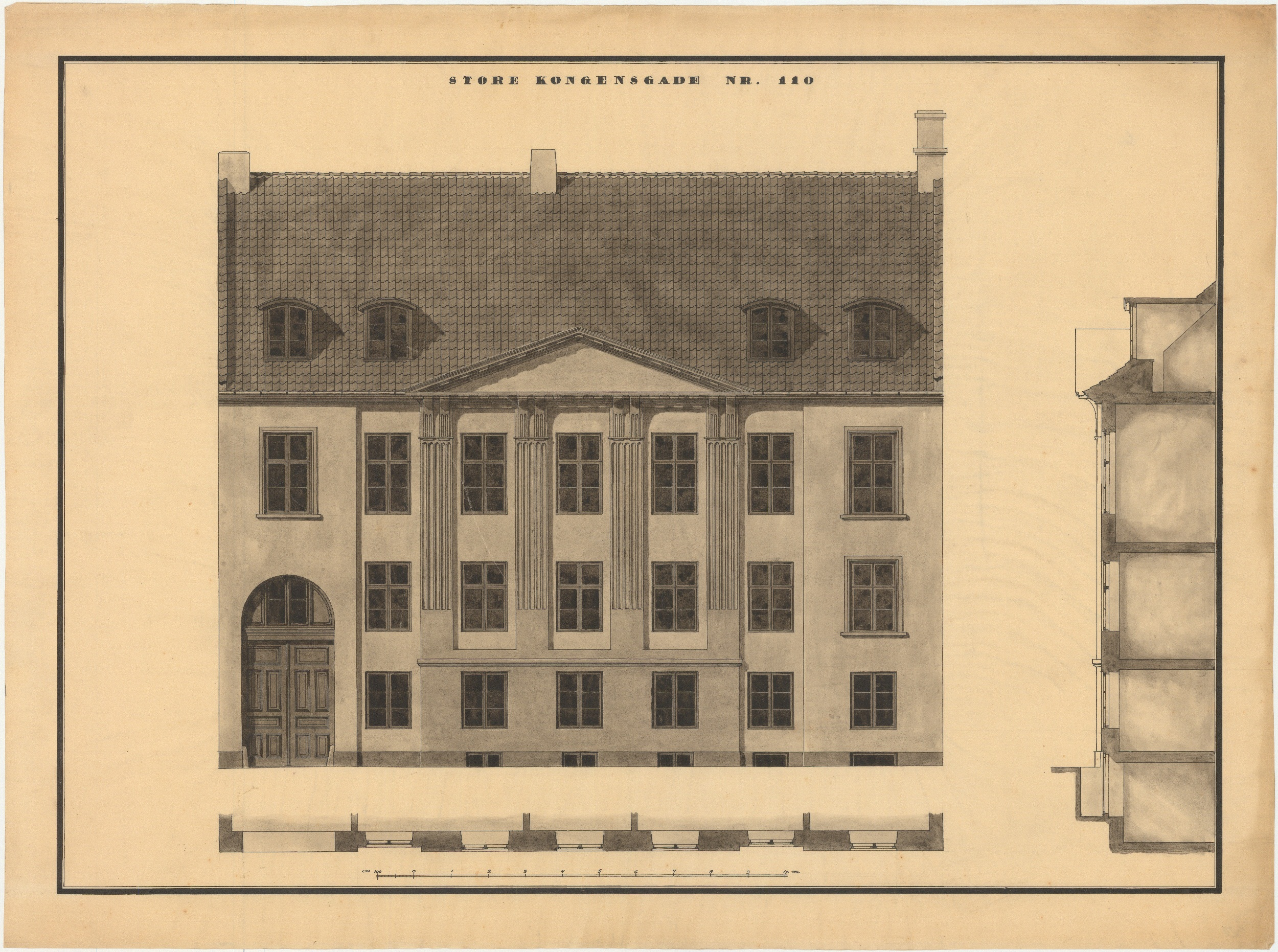
Dacade drawing

The Neoclassical building fronting the street was probably designed by one of the students of Caspar Frederik Harsdorff. It consists of three storeys and is seven bays wide. The facade has a three-bay median risalit and two wide single-bay corner resilits. The two upper storeys of the median risalit is decorated with four Giant order Ionic pilasters with triglyphs carrying a triangular pediment. The roof is clad with black tiles and features four dormer windows, two on each side of the median risalit. A gateway is located in the northern corner risalit. A door in the south wall of the gateway provides access to the building's main staircase. The apartment on the second floor features a number of original ornamental details, including a mural of a romantic landscape with a ruin.

A five-bay perpendicular side wing with red tile roof extends from the rear side of the building. The fifth bay of the side wing is canted. A rear wing from the 1850s is located at the bottom of the courtyard. A gateway in the building opens to another courtyard with a second rear wing from 1857.

== Today ==
In 2007–07. Building C and D () were converted into 18 condominiums by Trianglen Erhverv ApS. This was done with assistance from HMT Arkitekter. They range in size from 85 to 130 m2.
