= 1762 in architecture =

The year 1762 in architecture involved some significant events.

== Events ==
- King George III of the United Kingdom begins remodelling Buckingham Palace in London as his family's main London residence.
- Construction of the Petit Trianon in the grounds of the Palace of Versailles in France to the design of Ange-Jacques Gabriel begins.
- Construction of the Brick Market in Newport, Rhode Island, to the design of Peter Harrison begins (completed 1772).
- Completion of the main building of Royal Hospital Haslar on the south coast of England (begun 1746; first patients admitted 1753) to the design of merchant and architect Theodore Jacobsen; this is the world's largest hospital and Europe's largest brick building at this time.

== Buildings and structures ==
=== Buildings ===
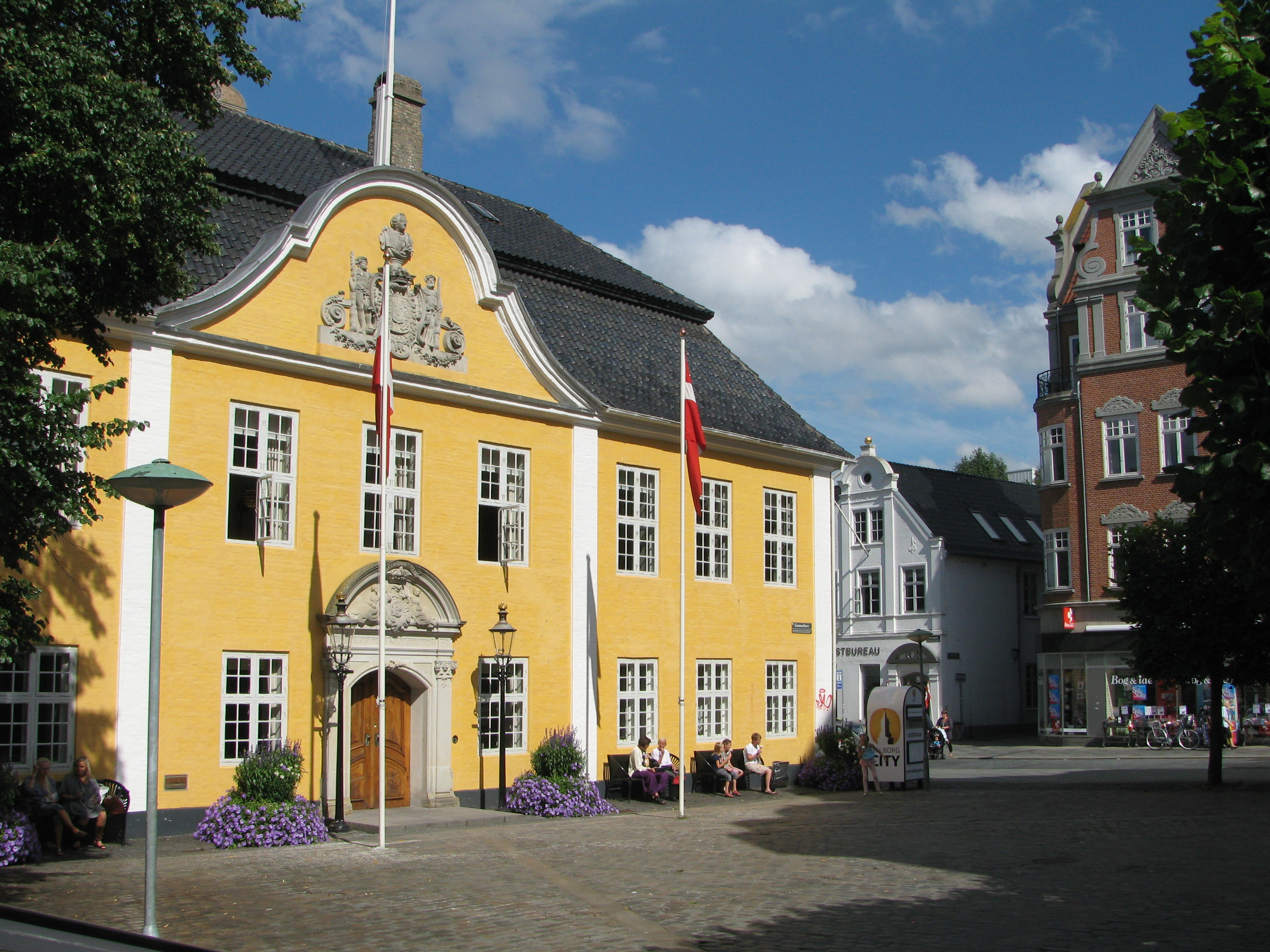
Old City Hall (Aalborg)

- Milsom Street, Bath, England, is built by Thomas Lightholder.
- Plymouth Synagogue in England, the oldest synagogue built by Ashkenazi Jews in the English-speaking world, is built, apparently without an architect.
- St George's German Lutheran Church in London is built.
- Old St. Thomas's Church, Dublin, Ireland, designed by John Smith after Palladio, is completed.
- Old City Hall (Aalborg) in Denmark, built by Daniel Popp, is completed.
- Old State House (Providence, Rhode Island) is substantially completed.
- Faneuil Hall, Boston, Massachusetts, is rebuilt after a fire.
- Richmond Place on the River Thames at Richmond, England, designed by Robert Taylor, is completed for Sir Charles Asgill.
- Schuyler Mansion in Albany, New York, designed by John Gaborial, is completed.
- Upton Scott House in Annapolis, Maryland, is built by William Brown.
- Notre-Dame de Guebwiller is started (completed in 1785)

== Publications ==
- James Stuart and Nicholas Revett's Antiquities of Athens.

== Births ==
- April 14 – Giuseppe Valadier, Italian architect and designer, urban planner and archeologist (died 1839)
- September 20 – Pierre-François-Léonard Fontaine, French neoclassical architect, interior decorator and designer (died 1853)

== Deaths ==
- December 17? – Charles Labelye, Swiss civil engineer (born 1705)
- date unknown – Rosario Gagliardi, Sicilian architect (born 1698)
