= Aggersvold =

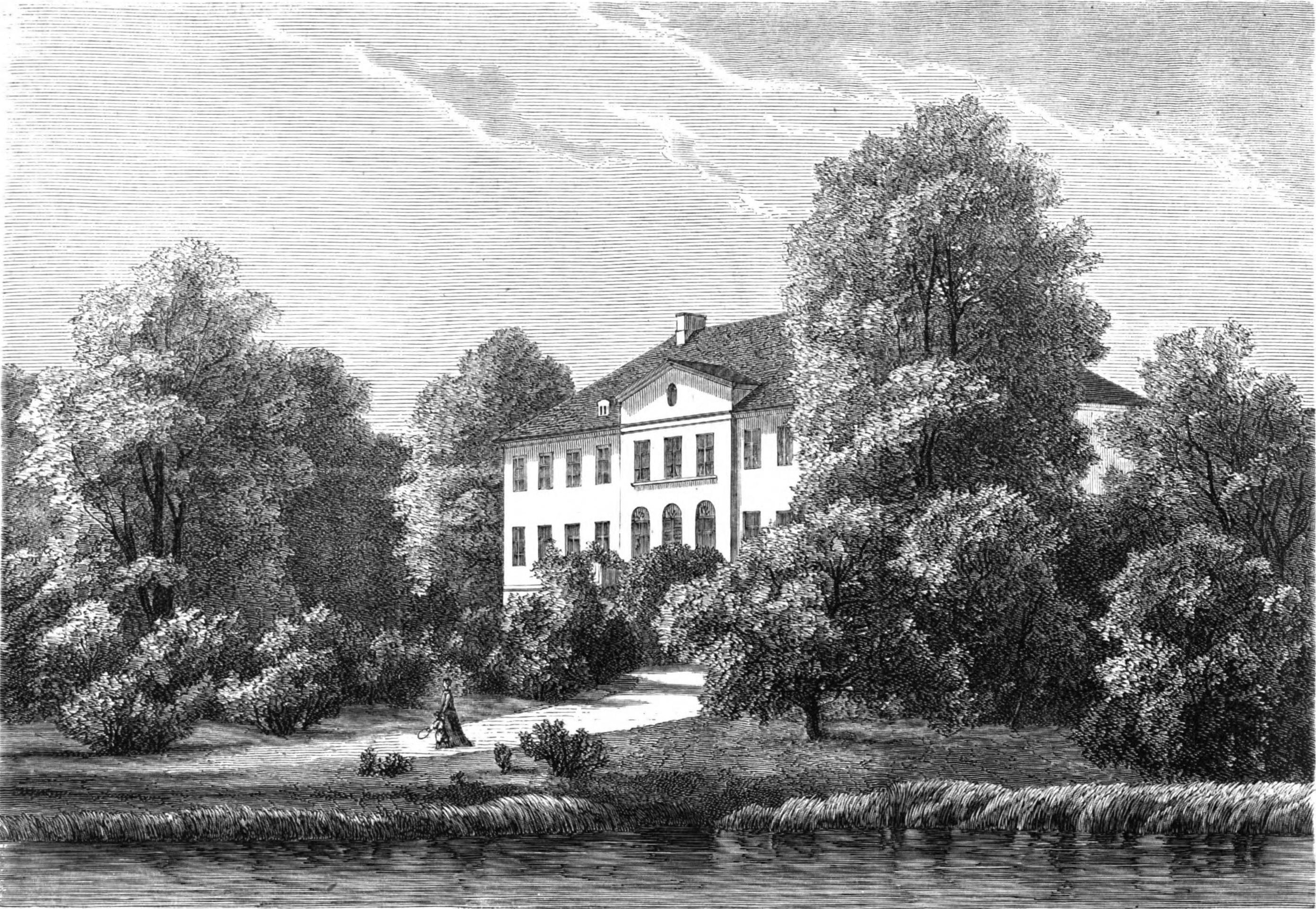
- Herregården Aggersvold in Holbæk, Denmark.

General information
- Architectural style: Neoclassical
- Location: Aggersvoldvej 21; 4450 Jyderup
- Country: Denmark
- Coordinates: 55°44′21.28″N 11°25′41.77″E
- Completed: 1835

Website
- aggersvoldgods.dk

Aggersvold is a manor house and estate located just north of Jyderup, Holbæk Municipality, some 80 kilometres west of Copenhagen, Denmark.

Aggersvold traces its history back to the Middle Ages when it was referred to as Markegaard, taking its name from the nearby village of Markeby. The name Aggersvold came into use during the 16th century, when three farms were merged together to form the estate. Its first recorded owner was Henrik Lang. Ownership of the property has transferred between several families over the last 500 years. The current main building was built in 1833–35 for major-general Harald Rothe (1781–1848). It was listed on the Danish registry of protected buildings and places in 1944.

Today, the estate covers a total area of 344 hectares of which 324 hectares are woodland and seven hectares are pastures. The main building is used as a venue for events, while the stables are still functional and have room for 20 horses.

== History ==
=== Mørkegaard ===
Aggersvold traces its history back to the Middle Ages when it was referred to as Markegaard, taking its name from the nearby village of Markeby.

In 1330-1536, Markegaard belonged to the Bishops of Roskilde. After the Reformation, together with all other property of the Catholic church, it was confiscated by the Crown.

=== 18th century ===
Aggersvold was established when Frederik Lange til Mørkegård merged the estate with Agerup and Sasserup. He and his wife Dorthe Christoffersdatter Lindenov moved the main building to its present location. Their son, Gunde Lange, sold the estate to admiral Henrik Vind in 1630. Vind, who had served in the Kalmar War (1611–13) and the Thirty Years' War (1625–29), died just 39 years old in 1733. His widow, Margrethe Pedersdatter Laxmand, who inherited the estate, married Joachim von Bredow in 1641. Their daughter, Marie Margrethe von Bredow, sold Aggersvold in 1691.

=== 18th century ===
The new owner was Niels Benzon, a major landowner and president of work for the Danish Chancellery, who had been ennobled in 1680. After his death in 1708, Aggersvold was passed on to his son Jacob Benzon. Peder Benzon, one of his brothers, acquired it in 1720 and a third brother, Lars Benzon, was the owner from 1733.

In 1737, Aggersvold was acquired by the Norwegian timber trader Herman Leopoldus. He was later ennobled under the name Løvenskiold. Løvenskjold's son, Severin Leopoldus Løvenskiold, sold it to Christian Lautrup in 1750.

In 1753, Aggersvold was acquired by Peder Juel. He expanded the estate with land that had until then belonged to four farms in the village of Høed. In 1760, he sold the estate to Laurits Switzer.

=== 19th century ===
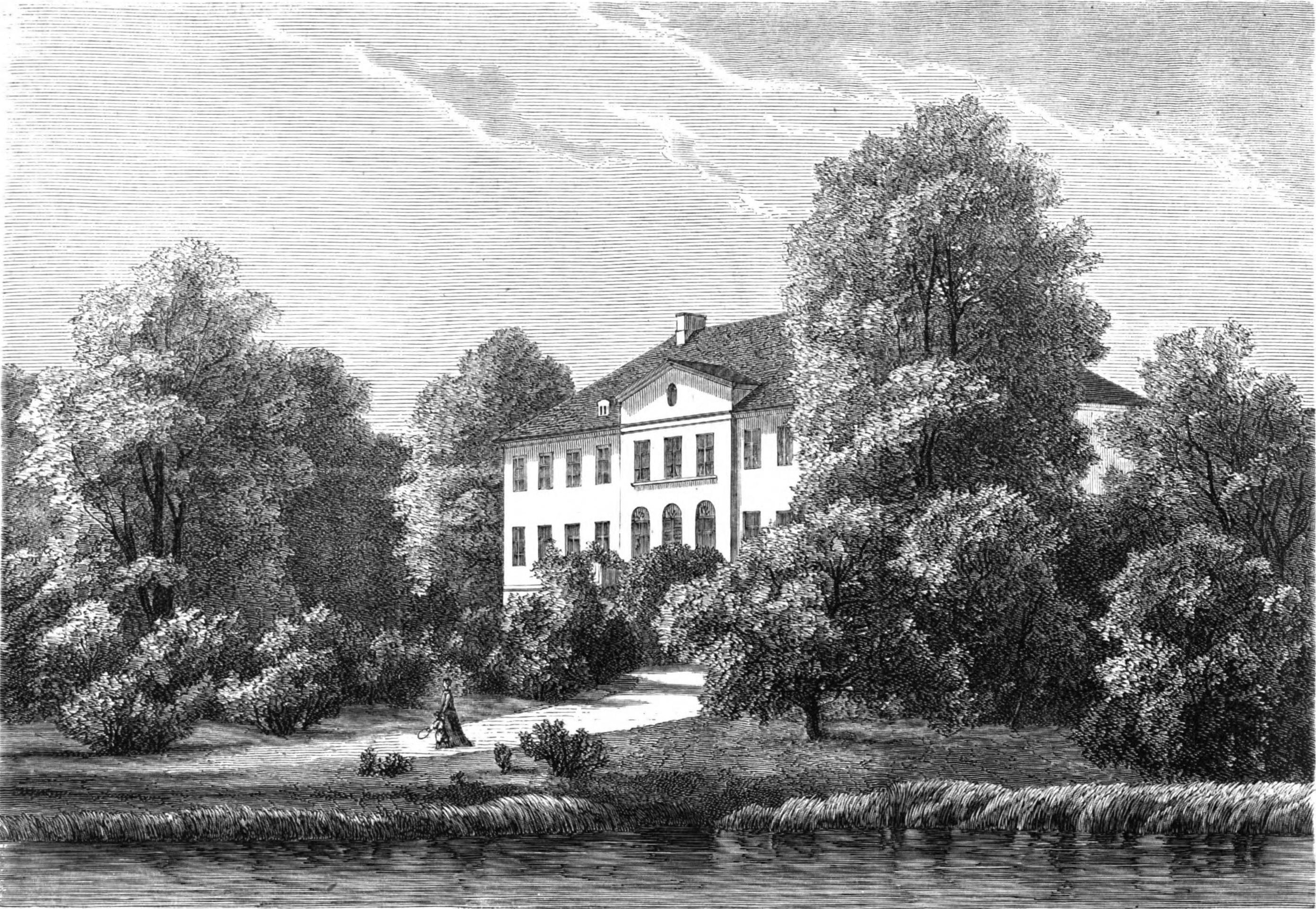
Aggersvold, c. 1870.

In 1806, Aggersvold was acquired by the army officer Harald Rothe (1781–1848). In 1809, he also bought Egholm. In 1824, he bought Frihedslund. In 1833–35, he construc ted a new main building on the Aggersvold estate. The estate was later passed to his son Carl Peter Rothe.

Christian Albrecht Lerche purchased Aggersvold in 1865. He did not live on the estate and the building gradually fell into disrepair while most of the tenant farms were sold to the tenant farmers. Lerche's widow sold it to Villars Knudsen Lunn in 1898 for 330,000 DKK. He expanded the forested land significantly around 1900.

=== 2+th century ===
In 1915, Aggersvold was sold to a consortium. The intention was to sell the land off in lots but these plans were not realized. Thor Timm purchased Aggersvold in 1916. Some of the land was used for the creation of new smallholdings in the period between 1923 and 1942. He also established the farms Skyttehaven (1926) and Fruensfold (1930). Descendants of the Timm family owned the estate until the estate was acquired by Johan Schrøder in the 2000s. In 2021, Aggersvold was purchased by Jørgen Torrey Troelsfeldt via the property company De Forenede Ejendomsselskaber.

== Architecture ==
The present main building was originally constructed between 1833 and 1835, but has been rebuilt several times since. The most drastic changes to the building were made between 1917 and 1919, when the estate's owner Thor Timm commissioned Frederik Kiørboe to renovate the building. It underwent major renovations in the 2000s to return the building to its original design.

The two-storey main building is built to a restrained Neoclassical design. The median risalit is decorated with pilasters and tipped by a triangular pediment. Monumental, Bornholmian sandstone staircases lead up to the main entrances on both sides of the building.

The farm buildings, a three-winged complex surrounding a central courtyard, are located to the north of the main building.

== List of owners ==
- (1581- )Frederik Lange
- ( -1630)Gunde Lange
- (1630-1633)Henrik Vind
- (1633-1640) Margrethe Pedersdatter Laxmand, gift 1) Vind 2) von Bredow
- (1640-1660) Joachim von Bredow
- (1660-1681) Margrethe Pedersdatter Laxmand, gift 1) Vind 2) von Bredow
- (1681-1691) Marie Margrethe Joachimsdatter von Bredow
- (1691-1708) Niels Benzon
- (1708-1720) Jacob Benzon
- (1720-1733) Peder Benzon
- (1733-1737) Lars Benzon
- (1737-1750) Herman Leopoldus Løvenskiold
- (1750) Severin Leopoldus Løvenskiold
- (1750-1753) Christian Lautrup
- (1753-1760) Peder Juel
- (1760-1777) Laurits Switzer
- (1777-1791) C.A. Frost
- (1791-1805) J. Fr. van Deurs
- (1805-1806) Otto Joachim Moltke
- (1806) Otto Lerche
- (1806-1848) Harald Rothe
- (1848-1865) Carl Peter Rothe
- (1865-1885) Christian Albrecht lensgreve Lerche
- (1885-1898) Cornelia lensgrevinde Tillisch gift Lerche
- (1898-1915) Villars Knudsen Lunn
- (1915-1916) Konsortium
- (1916- ) Thor Timm
- ( -1970) Svend Aage Timm
- (1970-2007) Aksel Tving
- (2007-2021) Aggersvold ApS v/ Johan Schrøder og familien Schrøder
- (2021-) Aggersvold ApS v/ De Forenede Ejendomsselskab* er
