= Peder Benzon =

Danish judge

Peder Benzon (26 July 1684 – after 13 May 1735) was a Danish landowner and Supreme Court justice. He was the owner of seven manors on Zealand at the time of his death in 1735.

== Early life ==
Bentzon was born in Copenhagen, the son of Danish Chancellery secretary Niels Benzon and Else Pedersdatter Scavenius. His father inherited Aastrup from his father-in-law. Peder Venzon was the brother of Jacob Benzon and Lars Benzon. He attended the Knight's Academy from 1699.

== Career ==
Benzon was appointed as judge first at the Hofretten in 1710 and as Supreme Court Justice from 1712. He was dismissed from the Supreme Court on 13 May 11735.

== Property ==
In 1708, Benzon inherited Aastrup from his father. In 1714, he sold Aastrup again and bought Hagestedgaard in 1711. He acquired Gjeddesdal from his brother Lars Benzon in 1714 and sold Hagestedgaard to him the following year. He acquired Tryggevælde and Alslevgård in 1716 but ceded the estates to King Frederick IV in exchange for Vibygård in 1718. He acquired Aggersvold from his brother Jacob Benzon in 1720 but ceded it to Lars Benzon in 1723.

He was also the founder of a number of new manors. He founded Benzonseje (now Risbyholm) in 1721 and the manors of Benzonslund (now Dønnerup), Benzonsdal and Gislingegård in 1730.

== Personal life ==
Bentzon married Anne Sophie Wissing (1692-1762) in 1709. He was the father of military officer and landowner, Christian Benzon (1718–1801).
