= Frederik Barfred =

Danish wine merchant

Frederik Barfred (1711 – 7 January 1794) was a wealthy Danish wine merchant and landowner. He owned the property Rådhusstræde 1 in Copenhagen as well as the estate Benzonsdal at Thorsminde. He operated the tavern in the basement of Copenhagen City Hall. He was elected as one of Copenhagen's 32 Men and also served as one of the directors of Kjøbenhavns Brandforsikring.

== Early life and education ==
Barfred was born in 1711. Some sources mention that he was born in Kalundborg but he cannot be found in the church records. He was trained as a wine merchant both in Denmark and abroad. He was in Frankfurt in 1734.

== Career ==
In 1739, Barfred acquired citizenship as a wine merchant in Copenhagen after having bought the property at the corner of Rådhusstræde and Brolæggerstræde (now Rådhusstræde 1). On 29 June 1740. he was married to a daughter of the wealthy brewer Lauritz Rasmussen. This secured him a downy of 12,000 Danish rigsdaler and connections in the city's business elite. From 1744 until his death in 1794, he leased the tavern in the basement of Copenhagen City Hall. In 1757, he bought the estate Benzonsdal at Thorslunde. The estate had an area of 668 tønder harrkorn.

Barfred's father-in-law served as one of the directors of Kjøbenhavns Brandforsinkring. In 1794, together with three others, Barfred was tasked with auditing the fire insurance company's accounts. In 1751–770, he served as one of its five directors. In 1751–70, he served as one of the 12 board members (Delibarationskommitteret). In 1754, he was elected as one of the city's 32 Men. In 1765 he was suspended from the council after a dispute with the other members. A commission overturned the suspension but the controversy continued and in December 1766 he handed in his resignation.

== Personal life ==
On 29 June 1941, he married Christiane Rasmussen (1725-1796). She was a daughter of the wealthy brewer Lauritz Rasmussen.

Barfred died on 12 January 1794. The value of his estate was 110,478 rigsdaler.

His former building at the corner of Rådhusstræde and Brolæggerstræde was destroyed in the Copenhagen Fire of 1795. In 1786, Barfred had ceded Benzonsdal to his son Jens Lauritz Barfred. In 1800, it was sold to Ulrich Detlev von Eggers.
