= Peter Mandrup Lem =

Danish violin virtuoso (1758–1828)

Peter Mandrup Lem (baptized 7 June 1758 - 12 January 1828) was an eighteenth-century Danish violin virtuoso. Among his few compositions always mentioned by his contemporaries are his both symphonies, violin concertos, piano pieces and an oratorio, although none of them is known to be preserved.

== Biography ==
=== Life ===
Peter Lem was born in Copenhagen and received his first education from his father, John Lem, accountant for Skillings-Ligkassenthen, and his mother Kirstine, née Tonnesen. Still as a child he drew the attention of concert master Johann Hartmann, of whom he became a pupil. As a twelve-year-old child he could perform "even the most difficult concertos and solos, not without admiration from those who listened to him", which was read in the Adresseavisen after the boy had had his debut as soloist and member of Det musikalske Selskab at a concert in Rådhusstræde (City Hall Street) on 1 February 1770.

The following year he was admitted to the Royal Chapel and traveled with royal subsidy abroad to seek further education, staying especially in Vienna and Italy, and returned to Copenhagen in 1783. On 11 February 1784 he gave a concert at the Royal Danish Theatre, where he received tumultuous applause for his extraordinary skill, his tasteful performance, particularly in the adagio, and his uncommonly elegant bowing. In 1785 he began teaching violin playing in the Chapel, succeeding Hartmann in 1793 as concert master, an honor which at the time was very rare. Shortly after that he was appointed professor.

=== Legacy ===
Lem's importance for the development of live concerts in Copenhagen was very significant and groundbreaking in several directions, not only as a virtuoso and soloist, but also as a chamber music player and leader of Det harmoniske Selskab. He made large profits as a concertist and also as a teacher to his young students.

From his public activities he drew back relatively early, by reason of infirmity spending his last years in seclusion. He died in Copenhagen on 12 January 1828, leaving his spouse Regina, Countess Magliani, widow. She survived him by 4 years (d. 23 May 1832). His compositions are only a few, among them a violin concerto and two symphonies written for his 1784 concert, and an oratorio: Christ Church, written for his 1785 Violin Concerto. Published in Vienna and in his native land is only his 12 Minuets for small orchestra written in 1784. He played for the last time in 1811.
