= Niels Bang =

Danish landowner (1776–1815)

Niels (de) Bang (20 February 1776 – 30 August 1815) was a Danish landowner. In 1809, he was awarded the Knight's Order of the Dannebrog for his efforts during the Battle of Copenhagen. He was the father-in-law of painter Frederik Sødring.

== Early life and education ==
Bang was born on 20 February 1776 in Copenhagen, the son of attorney general and later president of Hof- og Stadsretten Ole B. (1731–89) and Else Marie Thecou (1735–1802). He was the elder brother of author Balthasar Bang.

Bang earned a Candidate of Law degree from the University of Copenhagen in 1798. He then went on to study economy in Göttingen and travelled in Bavaria and Switzerland to study farming and industry.

== Career ==
Bang worked for Rentekammeret (as auskultant) from 1799 to 1804. In 1800, he and his brother-in-law Christian von Eggers bourht Benzonsdal from Jens Lauritz Barfred. Shortly thereafter he bought the brother-in-law's share of the estate. Fearing an outbreak of dysentery in Ishøj he made great efforts to keep the outbreak from spreading, care for the sick and bury the dead. In 1806, he sold Benzonsdal to Peder Bech.

In 1807, he bought Sparresholm at Næstved. He converted many of the tenant farms to freeholdings and had a reputation for being a progressive farmer. In 1809 he established a facility for the preparation of flax on the estate.

== Battle of Copenhagen ==
After the English landed on Zealand in 1807, he gathered and equipped a volunteer corps of 200 men and led it himself to the commanding general's headquarters. The king rewarded him in 1809 with the Knight's Cross of the Dannebrog.

== Personal life ==
In 1802, Bang married Cathrine Amalie Henriette Callisen (1779–1879). She was the daughter of the medical doctor Henrich Callisen (1740–1824) and Marie Amalie Walcker (1756–1837).

Bang died in 1816. He is buried at Toksværd Cemetery. Sparresholm passed to his eldest son Oluf Henrich Niels de Bang. He also acquired the estate Haraldskær. The daughter Henriette Marie de Bang married the painter Frederik Sødring.
