= Old Government House =

Old Government House may refer to:

- Old Government House, Parramatta, Australia
- Old Government House, Queensland, Australia
- Old Government House, South Australia, Australia
- Old Government House, Hobart, Australia
- Government House (Battleford), Canada
- Old Government House, Fredericton, Canada
- Old Government House, Auckland, New Zealand
- Old Government House (Augusta, Georgia), USA

== See also ==
- Old City Hall (disambiguation)
- Old Town Hall (disambiguation)
