= Gjeddesdal =

Manor house in Greve Municipality, Denmark

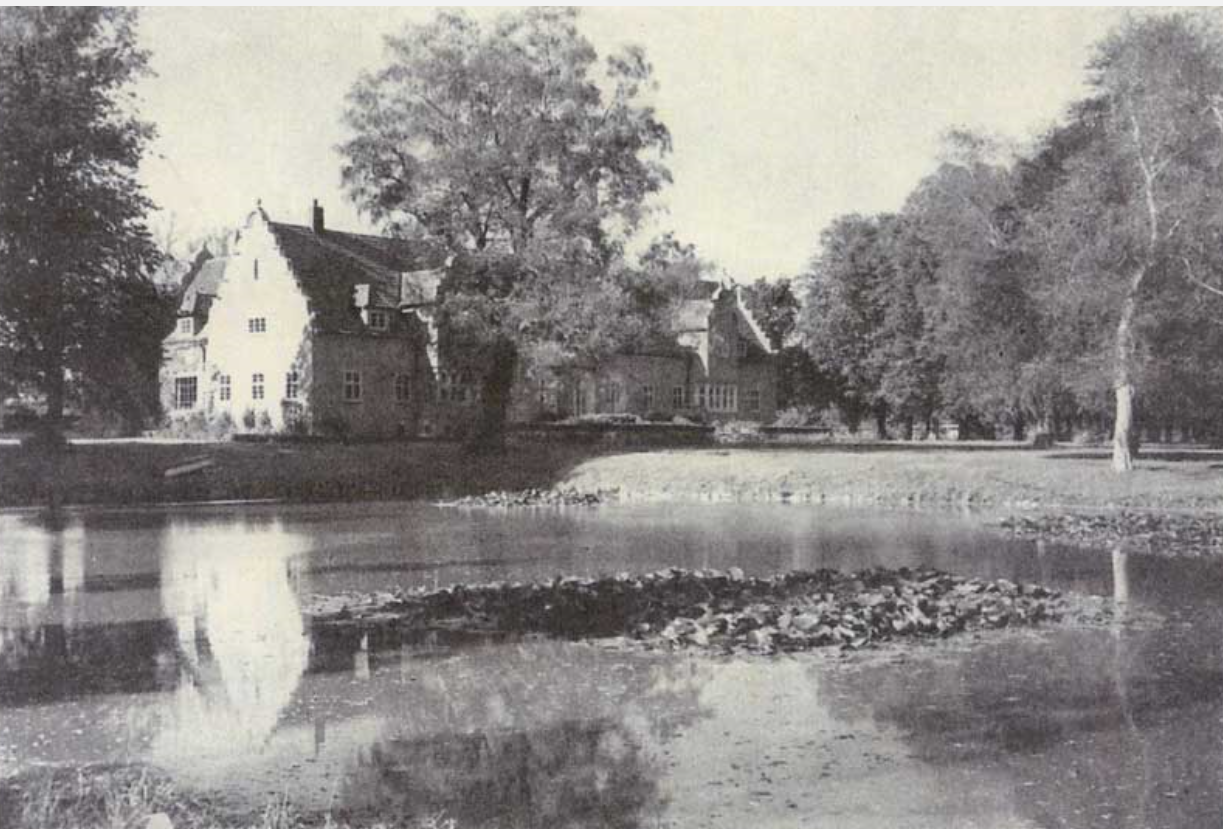
- Gjeddesdal in 1944
- Interactive map of the Gjeddesdal area

General information
- Location: Greve Municipality, Denmark
- Coordinates: 55°36′28.93″N 12°13′42.16″E
- Construction started: 1916

Design and construction
- Architect: Axel Poulsen

Gjeddesdal is a manor house located in Greve Municipality, some 20 kilometres west of central Copenhagen, Denmark. The estate was created in the 1670s but the current main building was built after a fire in 1916.

== History ==
=== 1782–1761:Vind and Benzon ===
Gjeddesdal was created In 1672 by Holger Vind. It replaced the village of Pårup. Vind named the estate after his wife Margrethe Gjedde. She became the owner after his death in 1683. She died in 1706 and the heirs then sold it to Niels Benzon. His son Lars Benzon inherited it in 1708 but sold it to his brother Peder Benzon in 1814. Peder Benzon significantly increased the size of the estate, for instance by closing down all the farms in the village of Torslundelille. In 1730, he divided it in two by creating a new manor, Benzonsdal, from almost half of the land. When it was sold in auction after Peder Benzon's death in 1735, Lars Benzon bought it back but sold it to their brother Jacob Benzon in 1740. He owned it until his death in 1761.

=== 1761–1822: Von Kløcker, Wulff Gjøe and Barfred ===
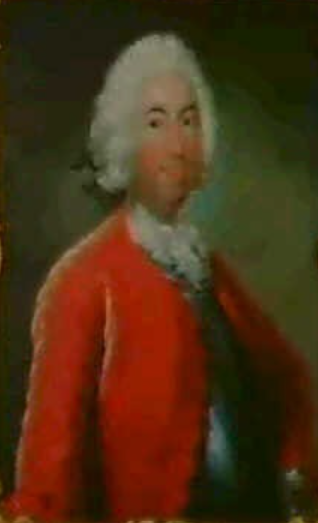
Herman Lengerken Kløcker.

In 1761, Benzon's heirs sold the estate to Herman Lengerken von Kløcker. He created a so-called stamhus from the estate with the effect that it could no longer be sold, mortgaged or divided between heirs but it was dissolved shortly thereafter. In 1774, his widow, Caroline von Hoppe, sold the estate to Michael Wulff Gøye. Gøye was interested in the enlightenment philosophy of the time and for the living conditions of the farmers on his land. Gøye died in 1795. In his will, he granted the tenant farmers the right to buy their farms at prices determined in the will. He also decided that part of the money from a sale of Gjeddesdal should be used for the creation of a grant. Tune Landbyskole was founded after the turn of the century

Gøye's heirs sold Gjeddesdal to Jens Laurids Barfred in 1797. Most of the farms were sold to the farmers at prices determined by Gøye in his will. Jens Laurids Barfred bought up more land in the area. In 1819, he created a new farm, Barfredshøj, from the northern part of the estate. It was, however. difficult times for Danish agriculture. Faced with bankruptcy, Barfred had to sell first Barfredshøj and then in 1822 Gjeddesdal.

=== 1822–1927: Valentiner family ===
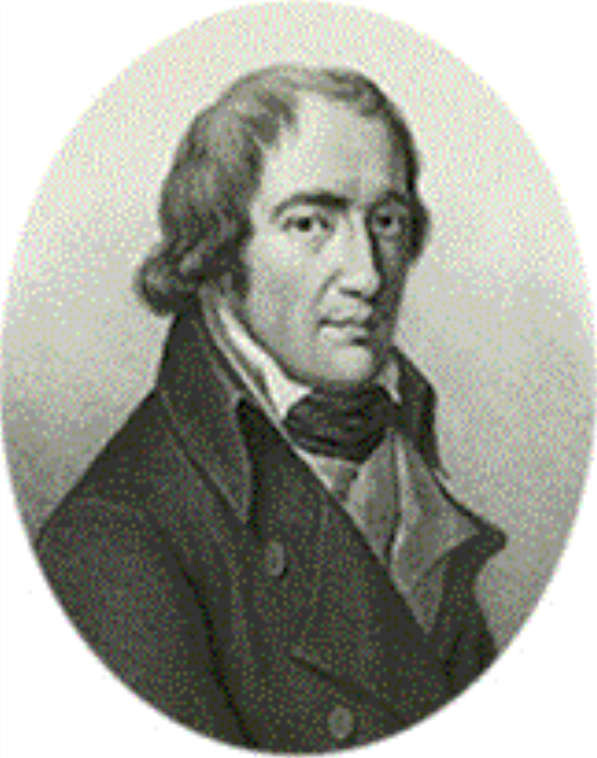
Heinrich Christian Valentiner

The new owner was Heinrich Christian Valentiner. He was originally from Holstein but had purchased Bredeshave at Præstø the previous year. He improved the soil and introduced new farming methods. He also established his own slaughterhouse on the farm, salting the meat and exporting it to France and the Netherlands. From 1828 he also kept dairy cattle and opened a dairy on the farm shortly before his death.

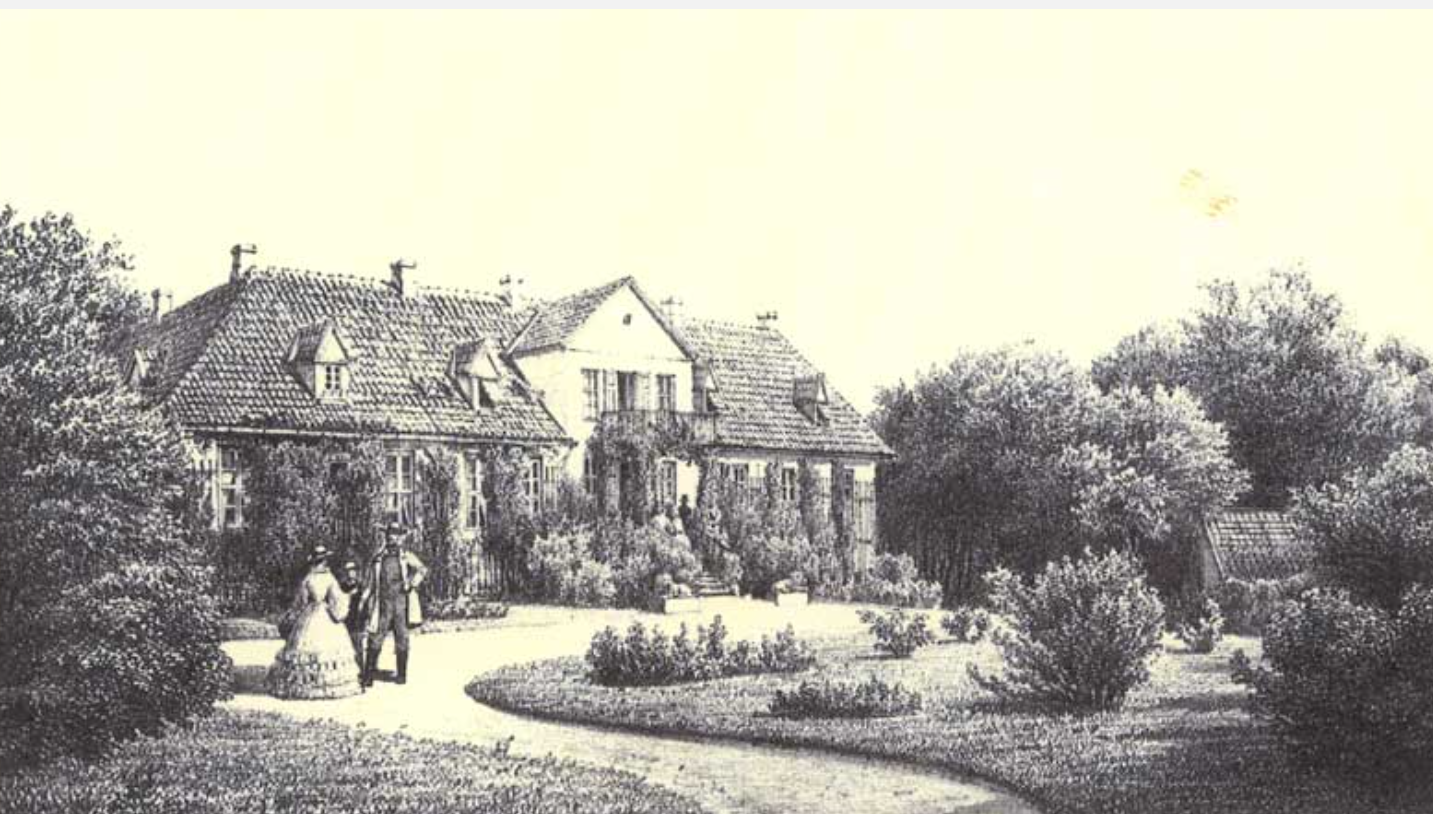
Gjeddesdal painted by Ferdinand Richardt, c. 1860

His son, Adolph Valentiner, inherited the estate in 1831. He renovated the main building and drained the land systematically as the first landowner in the country.

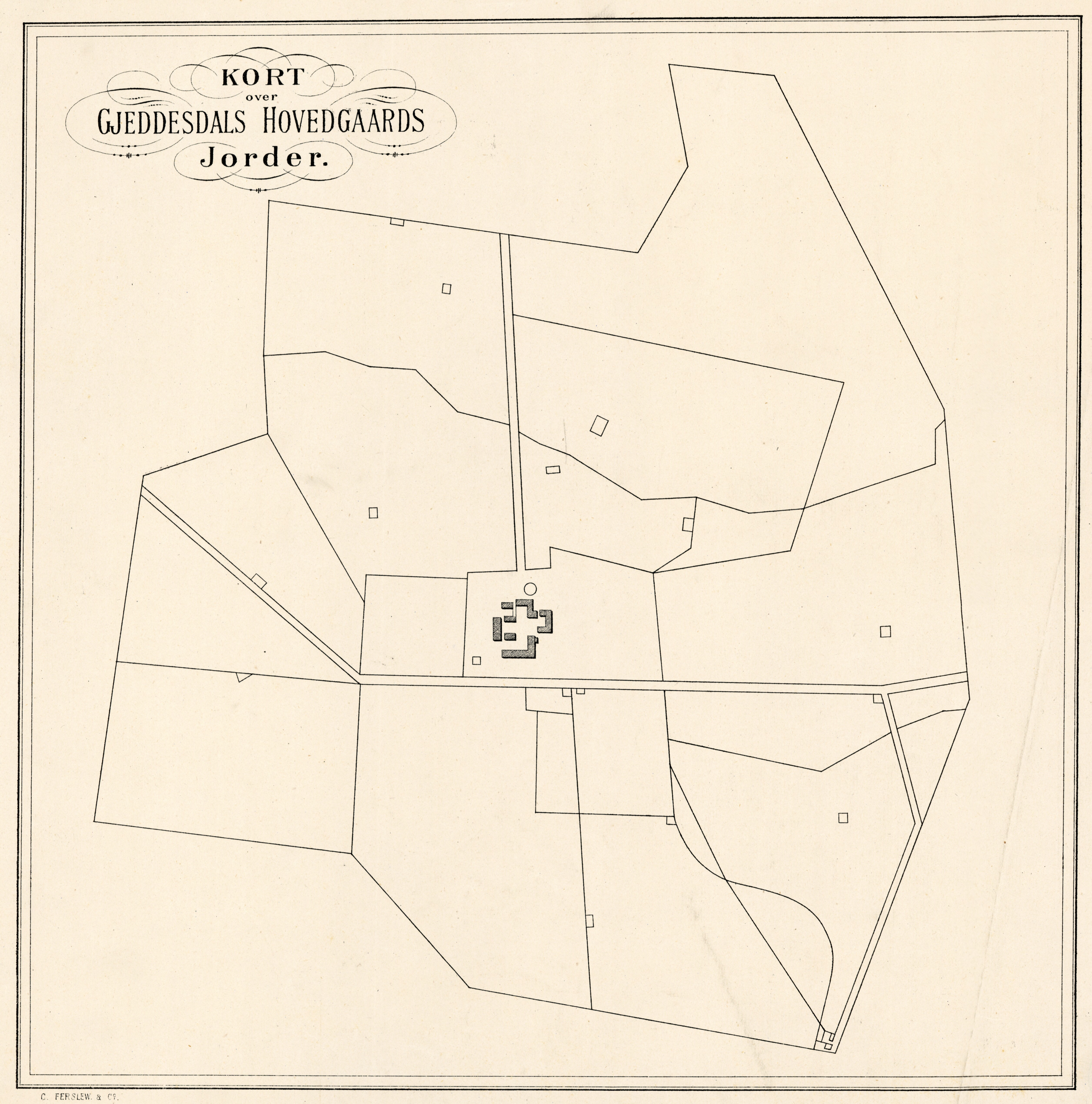
Gjeddesdal in 1881.

After Adolph Valentiner's death in 1868, Gheddesdal was passed down to first his son Heinrich Nicolai Valentiner and then to his grandson Adolph Herman Valentiner. The old main building was destroyed in a fire in 1916 and a new one was built in its place.

=== 1927–present: Nymann family ===
In 1927, Adolph Herman Valentiner sold Gjeddesdal to Martin Nymann. Barfredshøj was purchased in i 1989.

== List of owners ==
- (1672-1683) Holger Vind
- (1683-1706) Margrethe Vind, née Gjedde
- (1706-1708) Niels Benzon
- (1708-1714) Lars Benzon
- (1714-1735) Peder Benzon
- (1735-1738) Estate of Peder Benzon
- (1735-1741) Lars Benzon
- (1741-1761) Arvinger efter Lars Benzon
- (1761-1765) Hermann Lengerken von Kløcker
- (1765-1774) Caroline von Hoppe, gift von Kløcker
- (1774-1795) Michael Wulff Gjøe
- (1795-1797) Estate of Michael Wulff Gjøe
- (1795-1822) Jens Laurits Barfred
- (1822-1831) Heinrich Christian Valentiner
- (1831-1868) Adolph Valentiner
- (1868-1905) Heinrich Nicolai Valentiner
- (1905-1927) Adolph Hermann Valentiner
- (1927-1956) Martin Nymann
- (1956-2002) Steen Nymann
- (1983-present) Søren Nymann
