= Lars Benzon =

Danish Royal Navy deputy director

Lars Benzon (July 21, 1687 – October 5, 1741) was a landowner and a Deputy Director (deputeret) in the General Affairs Commission of the Danish Royal Navy.

== Biography ==
Lars Benzon was born at Sæbygård Manor on the island of Zealand, Denmark. He was the son of General Counselor of the Admiralty Council, Niels Benzon (1646–1708) and Else Scavenius (1660–89). He was the brother of Jacob Benzon and Peder Benzon.

In 1717, while he was working as a personal secretary (kammerjunker), he received an appointment as deputy in the General Commissioner, a high-ranking title he held during the times of Count Frederik Danneskiold-Samsøe (1707-1770). Danneskiold was a grandson of King Christian V of Denmark and served as secretary council (Geheimrat) from 1729 and Lieutenant admiral from 1743.

In 1721, Benzon assisted in drafting new approach to accounting for the Danish navy. In 1731 he became a royal advisor (konferensråd). In 1738, an anonymous complaint was made against Danneskiold's administrative approach, which resulted in reports in favour of Danneskiold from the admiralty and the commissariat. Despite these, Benzon ruled against Danneskiold. However, King Christian VI sided with Danneskiold, sharpy rebuking Benzon. Danneskiold called for Benzon's dismissal.

Although the king maintained his authority, Benzon resigned his post.

== Personal life ==
On 12 March 1721, he married Charlotte Amalie von Adeler (1703-1724). In 1738, Benzon retired to his estates (Sæbygård, Hagestedgaard and Kornerup). He died in 1742.
