= Old City Hall (Aalborg) =

Listed building at Gammeltorv Aalborg, Denmark

Aalborg Old City Hall
- Aalborg Gamle Rådhus
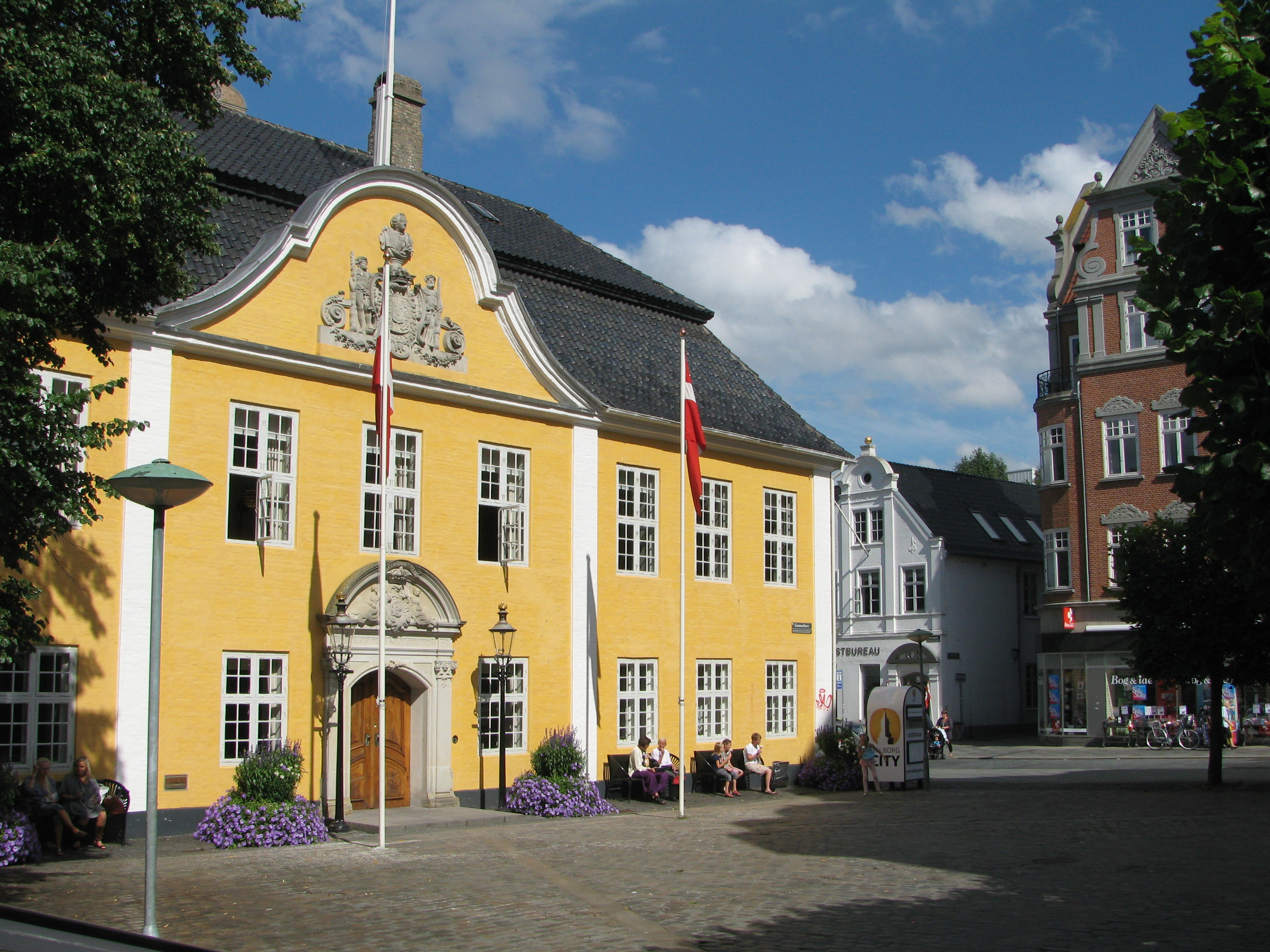
- Old City Hall view from Gammeltorv
- Interactive map of the Aalborg Old City Hall area

General information
- Architectural style: Rococo
- Location: Aalborg, Denmark, Denmark
- Coordinates: 57°02′53.65″N 09°55′14.62″E
- Construction started: 1757
- Completed: 1762
- Owner: Aalborg Municipality

Design and construction
- Architect: Daniel Popp

The Old City Hall at Gammeltorv Aalborg, Denmark, was built in 1762 and served as city hall until 1912. It is located at Gammeltorv and is now only used for ceremonial and representative purposes.

== Building ==
The city hall was built by master builder Daniel Popp, who had moved to Aalborg from Copenhagen, and was modelled on Johan Conrad Ernst's City Hall there, which was later completely destroyed in the Copenhagen Fire of 1795. This was a specific requirement from Iver Holck, the county governor (amtmand) at Aalborghus.

Designed in the Late Baroque style, the building consists of two storeys and a cellar under a black-glazed tile roof. The yellow-washed facade is decorated with white pilasters and a frontispiece featuring the Danish coat of arms and a bust of King Frederick V. His motto, Prudentia et Constantia, is also seen above the main entrance. The well-preserved door is a local example of the Rococo style. The building was listed by the Danish Heritage Agency in 1918.

== Current use ==
The Old City Hall is today only used for wedding ceremonies and representative purposes.
