= Rådhusstræde 1 =

Building in Copenhagen, Denmark

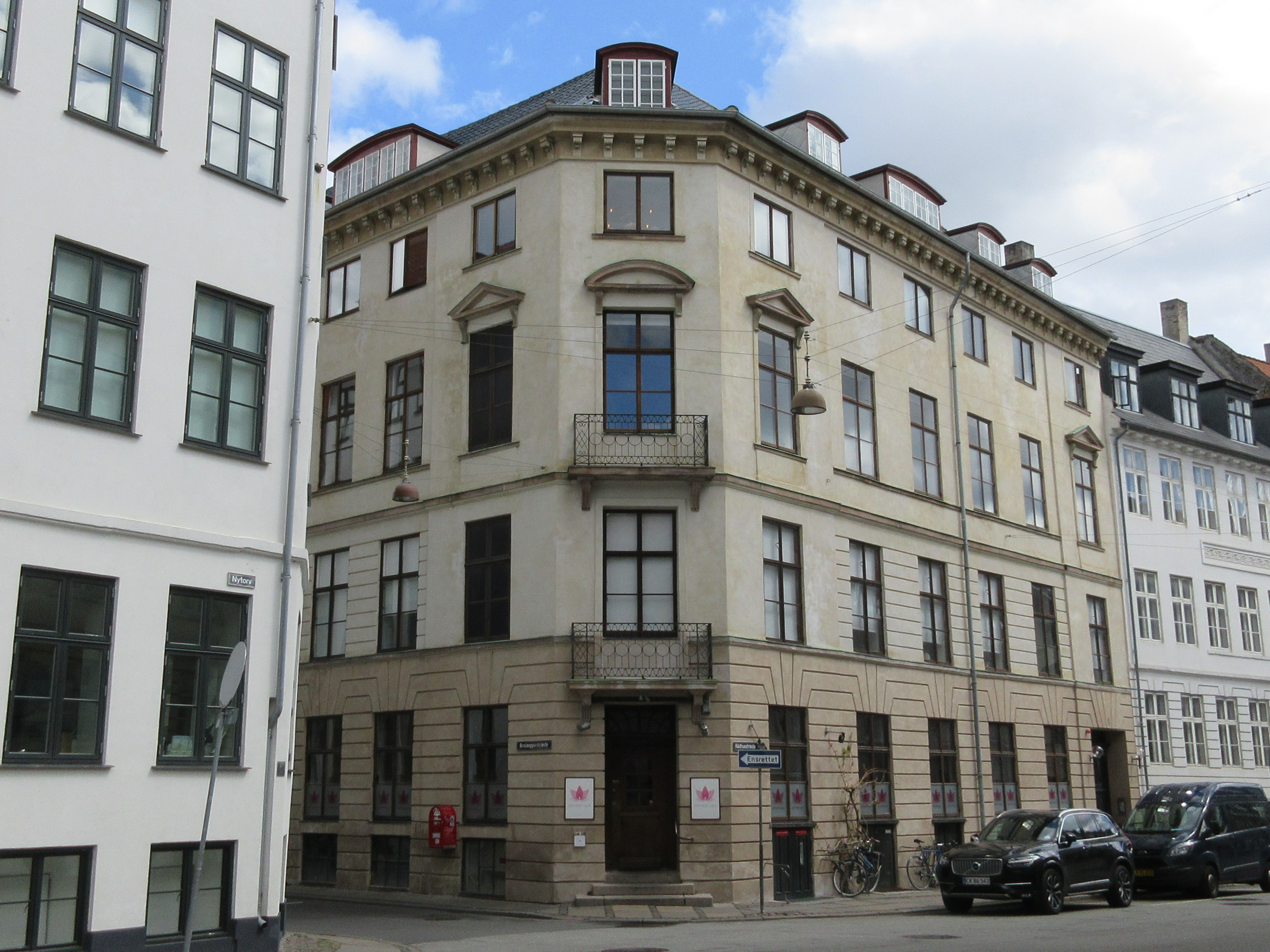
- Interactive map of the Rådhusstræde 1 area

General information
- Location: Copenhagen, Denmark
- Coordinates: 55°40′37.92″N 12°34′26.65″E
- Completed: 1798
- Renovated: 1851

Rådhusstræde 1/Brolæggerstræde 13 is a Neoclassical property overlooking Nytorv-Gammeltorv from its location at the corner of Rådhusstræde and Brolæggerstræde in the southeastern corner of the square, in the Old Town of Copenhagen, Denmark. The building was constructed by Andreas Hallander as part of the rebuilding of the city following the Copenhagen Fire of 1795, but owes its current appearance to a comprehensive renovation undertaken in 1851 for lawyer Carl Liebenberg. It was listed in the Danish registry of protected buildings and places in 1918. Former residents include the politician Christian Colbjørnsen, physician and former director of the Danish West India Company Johan Friedrich Heinrich and composer W.H.R.R. Giedde. Posthusteatret, a combined theatre and art cinema, is based in the basement.

== History ==
=== 18th century ===
The site was made up of two separate properties in the late 17th century. The corner property was listed in Copenhagen's first cadastre from 1689 as No. 126 in Snaren's Quarter, owned by Christoffer Bang. The adjacent property in Brolæggerstræde was listed as No. 127, owned by brewer Søren Jensen.

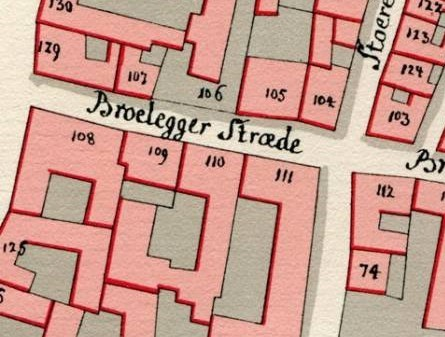
No. 108 and No. 109 seen in a detail from Christian Gedde's map of Snaren's Quarter, 1757

The corner property was later acquired by wine merchant Frederik Barfred. His property was listed in the new cadastre of 1756 as No. 108 in Snaren's Quarter. The adjacent property was Brolæggerstræde (old No. 127), listed as No. 109 and belonged to cashier of the Fire Insurance Company Niels Lihme.

No. 108 was still owned by wine merchant Friderich Barfred at the time of the 1787 census. He lived there with his wife Christiane Rasmussen, their daughter Anne Barfred, three lodgers, eight servants and other employees. Søren Munk, secretary of General Post Amtet, was also residing in the building with his wife Johanne Munk, their son Hans Munk, a male servant and two maids. At the time of the 1787 census, No. 109 was home to three Jewish families. One of them consisted of Isaac Jacob Ree, his wife Pessel Coen, their three daughters and a maid. Another household consisted of Joseph Ree, his wife Breine Halle and a maid. The third household consisted of Bendix Levin, his wife Juditte Ree, their three children (aged one to five) and a maid.

Together with most of the other buildings in the area, the two properties were destroyed in the Copenhagen Fire of 1795 and subsequently merged into a single property as No. 108. The present building on the site was constructed in 1797 by master carpenter Andreas Hallander.

=== Christmas and Heinrich ===
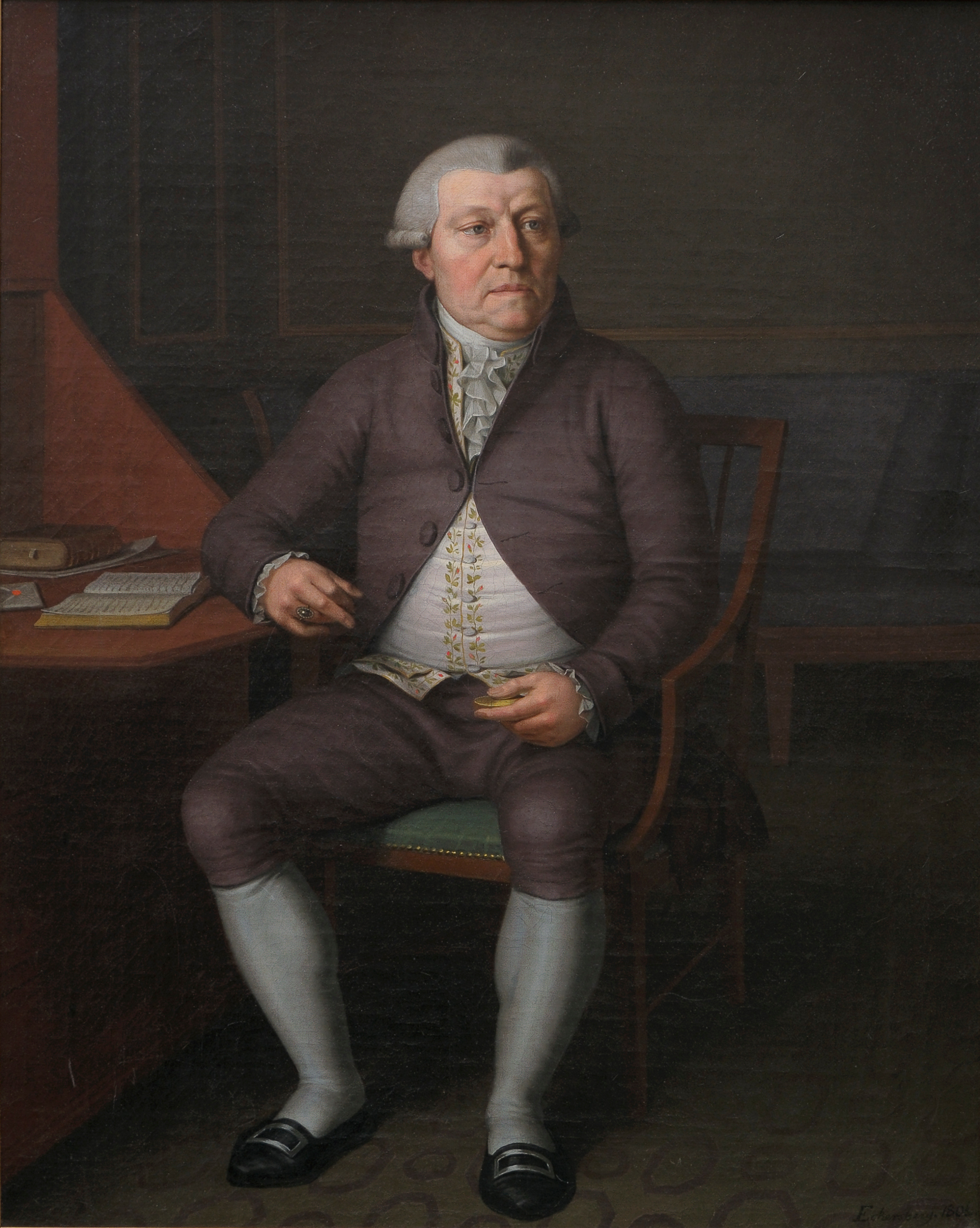
Johan Friedrich Heinrich

In 1798, Hallander sold the property to the English-born sea captain and general trader John Christmas. He had married Johanne Marie Heinrich (1771–1808) in 1797, daughter of former director of the Danish West India Company Johan Friedrich Heinrich (1730–1819) and Birgitte (née Lexmond, 1738–1811).

Christmas' property at the corner of Rådhusstærde and Brolæggerstræde was home to five households at the 1801 census. By 1801, he and his wife had moved into another house, Barchmann's Mansion. His parents-in-law Johan Friedrich and Bertha Heinrich resided in one of the apartments in their-son-in-law's property in Rådhusstræde. They lived there with their three youngest children, two cooks (one male and one female), a coachman, two servants and one maid. The daughter Anna Elisabeth Heinrich would later marry Christmas' business partner Thomas ter Broch. Heinrich's eldest daughter, Frideriche Sophie Heinrich, resided in another apartment with her two sons (aged two and three), a nanny, two female cooks and a female assistant cook. Her husband, Frederik Christopher, Count Trampe, is not mentioned as a member of the household. The couple was thus apparently not living together at this point. The marriage was dissolved on 1 November 1803. Politician Christian Colbjørnsen resided in another apartment with his wife Engelke Margrethe Falbe, their three daughters, two nieces, a governess, a caretaker, a male servant, a female cook, a nanny and three maids. Werner Hans Rudolf Rosenkrantz Giedde, a chamberlain and former administrative leader of the Royal Danish Orchestra as well as enthusiastic music collector and amateur flutist, resided in the building with his wife Anne Margrethe Brown, his niece Helene Catharine Giedde and Angelique von Holten as well as staff which included at least a coachman, two boys (one of them black) and a couple of maids.

Heinrich is still mentioned as a tenant in the census records from 1801, but purchased the property from his son-in-law later that same year. Christian Colbjørnsen and his family resided in the building until 1807, when they moved to an apartment at nearby Stormgade 10.

=== Joachim Israel Behrend ===
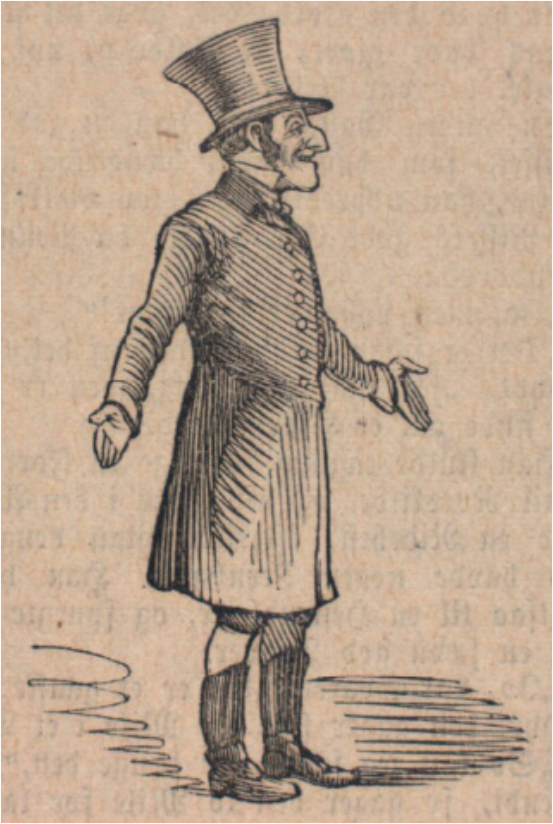
Joachim Israel Behrend

In 1804, Heinrich sold the property to the wealthy Jewish businessman Joachim Israel Behrend (1762–1821). In 1801, Berend had resided with his family at No. 242 in St. Ann's East Quarter (now Store Kongensgade 60 and Dronningens Tværgade 12). He was mainly trading in colonial goods from the Danish West Indies and timber, but was also active in the property market. He was already the owner of several properties, but made the first-floor apartment in Rådhusstræde his new home.

The property was listed as No. 46 in the new cadastre of 1806. In 1905, Behrend had also acquired a property in Amaliegade. in 1806, he purchased the entertainment venue Allenberg in Frederiksberg (sold in 1816). His personal wealth was estimated in 1807 at more than 1 million rigsdaler, making him among the 90 wealthiest persons in the country. On 3 March 1810, he was appointed as royal agent. In 1814, he sold the property at the corner of Rådhusstræde and Brolæggerstræde.

=== 1840 and 1850 censuses ===
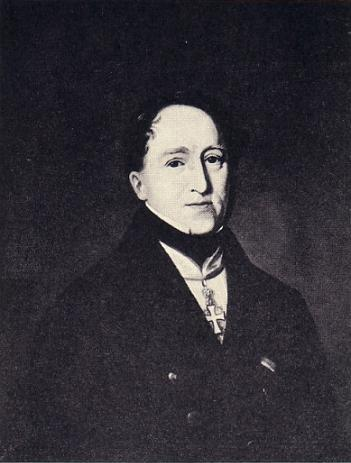
Julius Knuth

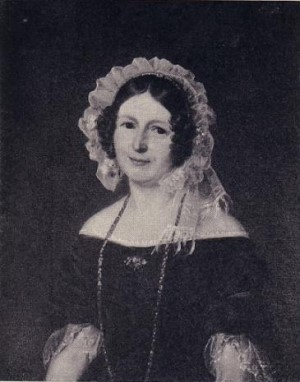
Georgine Frederikke Vilhelmine Knuth (née Hauch)

At the time of the 1840 census, the property was home to a total of 59 people. Count Julius Knuth (1787–1852), prefect of Zealand and owner of Bonderup Manor, resided on the first floor with his wife Georgine Wilhelmine Grevinde Knuth (née Hauch), their eight children, Ludvig Henrik Ferdinand Oppermann, Ane Georgine Marie Raffenberg and a staff of eight servants. Hans Baltzar Hornbeck, chief physician in the Danish West Indies, resided on the second floor with his wife Alfred Camillus Hornbeck, their four children (aged four to thirteen), his own brother and sister, a nanny, a male servant and two maids. Jørgen Andresen Bølling (1792–1862), secretary of the Royal Danish Library, resided on the third floor with his three children (aged nine to fifteen), his mother Petronella Bølling, niece Emilie Petronella Bølling, a housekeeper and four lodgers. Jacob Stenderup resided with his sister, two brothers, a housekeeper, a maid and a caretaker on the ground floor. Peter Olsen Haarsløv, a royal hearse coachman, resided in the basement with his wife Marie Elisabeth Haarløv (née Hansen) and five children.

Theologian Christian Thorning Engelstoft was among the residents of the building from 1841 to 1844. Historian Frederik Schiern (1816–1882) was among the residents in 1845–1846.

=== Carl Liebenberg ===
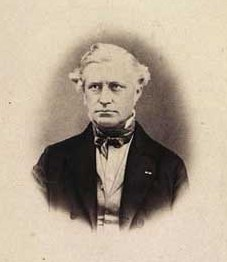
Carl Lieberberg

The property was at some point bought by the Supreme Court attorney Carl Liebenberg, possibly in around 1848 since he lived on the second floor from that year. The property was home to six households at the 1850 census. Liebenberg resided in one of the apartments with his brother Frederik Ludvig Liebenberg, one male servant and one maid. Julius Knuth resided on the first floor with his third wife Frederikke (née Haxthausen; his second wife had died in 1841), five of his seven children (one from his first marriage and four from his second) and a staff of eight people. Jørgen Andresen Bølling, secretary of the Royal Danish Library, resided on the third floor with his five children (aged 15 to 23) and eight other residents. Mathias Peter Ernst, a courier, resided on the ground floor with his wife Birgitte Lund, their three children (aged 19 to 28) and one maid. Gerhard Wilhelm Feldmann, a concierge and brick-layer, resided in the basement with his wife Henriette Wilhelmine Fæder, their two children (aged three and six) and one lodger. Niels Rasmussen, a barkeeper, resided in the basement with his wife Ane Christoffersdatter, their four children (aged six to 17) and a one-year-old boy in their care.

In 1851, Liebenberg made the property subject to a comprehensive renovation.

Rådhusstræde 1 was home to a total of 32 people at the time of the 1860 census. Now-widowed Frederikke Kathrine Knuth was still residing in the first-floor apartment, She lived there with two unmarried daughters (aged 31 and 33), a male servant, a female cook and two maids. Carl Liebenberg resided in the second-floor apartment with his foster daughter Antonette Thomasine Caroline Liebenberg, a housekeeper and a maid. Ludvig Theodor Malling (1807–1881), a businessman and director of Kreditforeningen for Østifternes Hushandel, resided on the third floor with his wife Anna Frederikke Malling (née Nabe), their four children (aged 12–24), a lodger and two maids. Christian Frederik Rasmussen, a courier working for Sparekassen for Kjøbenhavn og Omegn, resided on the ground floor with his wife Ernestine Sophie Rasmussen (née Ernst), their two daughters and a maid. Hans Christensen, a concierge, resided in the basement with his wife Killa Christensen (née Sonesen) and two children (aged one and four). Hans Hansen, an innkeeper, was also residing in the basement with his wife, daughter and a maid.

Liebenberg lived in the building until his death in 1865. His foster daughter married Alfred Lund Brorson (1837–1894), director of Københavns Forstæders Brandforsikring. They took over the second-floor apartment but later moved to the one on the third floor.

=== 20th century ===
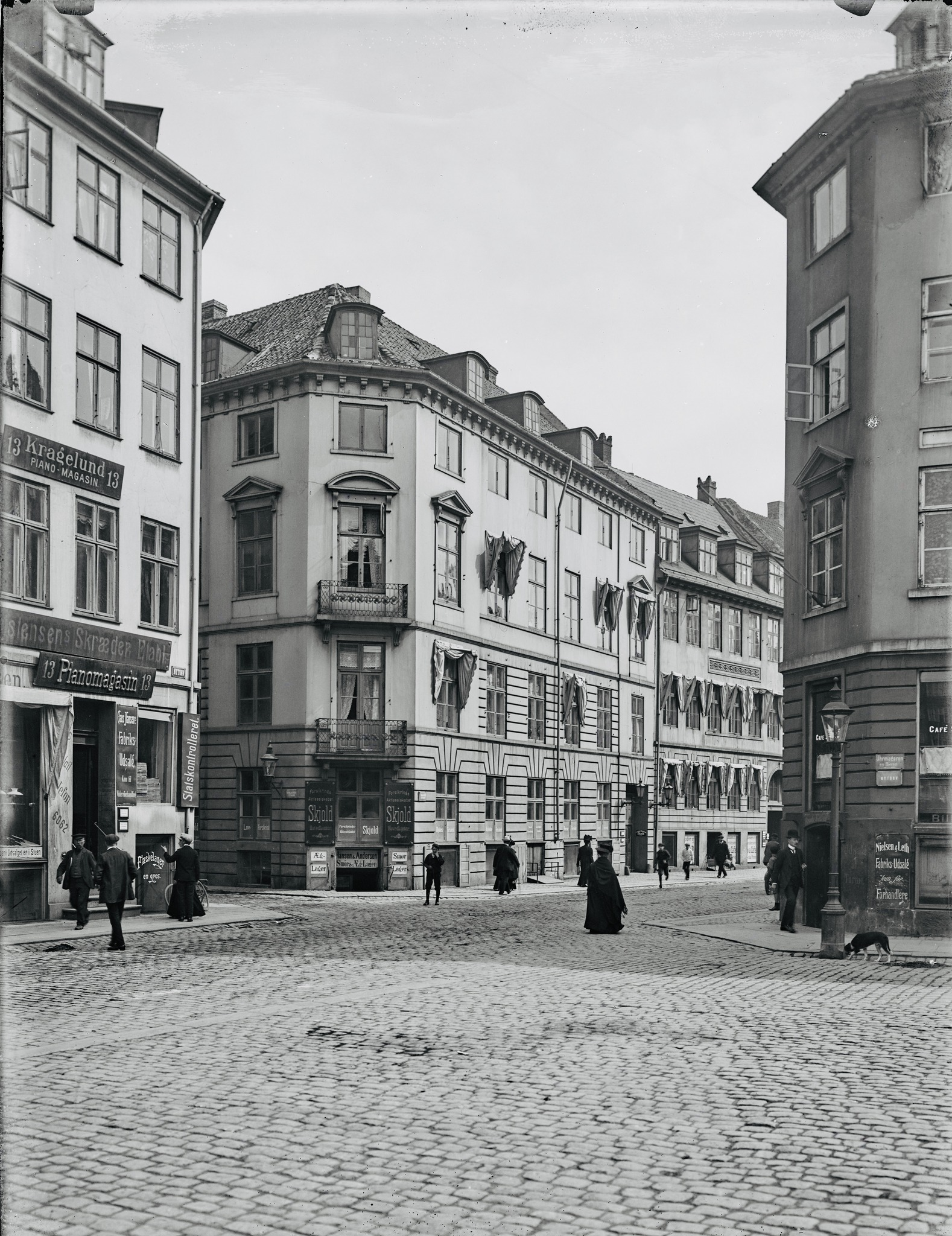
Rådhusstræde 1, photographed by Peter Elfelt in 1909

The building was only home to a total of eight people at the time of the 1906 census. Thea Linnemann, widow of former Bank of Denmark manager Stephan Linnemann, resided on the first floor with a female cook and a maid. Hans Hansen, a courier working for the Bank of Denmark, was also residing on the first floor as a lodger. Sophie Marie Linnemann, widow of Peter Linnemann, resided on the second floor with a maid. Johan Carl Frederik Schuricker, a courier for Skjold, resided with his wife on the fourth floor.

James F. Grøn & Co., a wholesale firm founded on 20 July 1898 by James P. Grøn (died 1920), was later based in the building. The company was continued by C.A.E. Herschend (born 1888) after the founder's death in 1920, initially alone, but in partnership with P.L. Jensen (born 1899) from 1925. The firm was based in the building until at least 1950.

Illustrator Herluf Jensenius (1888–1966) and his wife Ellen (née Petersen, 1886–1976) resided in the garret of Rådhusstræde 1 from 1934 and for the rest of their lives.

The building was owned by Supreme Court attorney Hans Lauritzen in the 1960s. He lived on one of the upper floors and ran his law firm from the first floor. The ground floor was a post office. Posthusteatret, a combined theatre and art cinema, opened in the basement in 1973.

On 1 April 1980, the property was converted into condominiums and was from then on jointly owned by the owners via Ejf Rådhusstr 1-Brolæggerstr 13. It was dissolved on 31 December 2008.

== Architecture ==
=== Rådhusstræde 1 ===
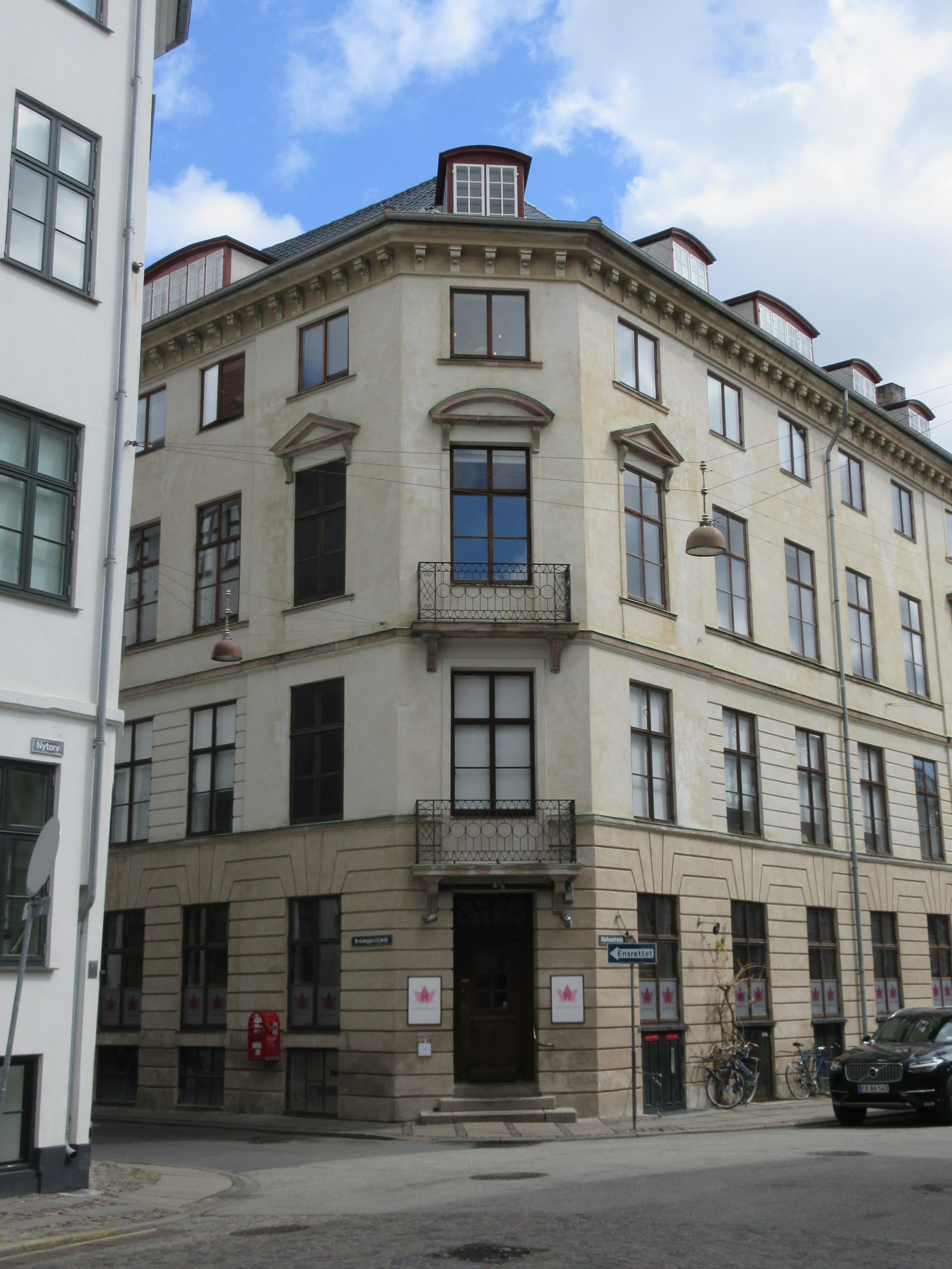
Rådhusstræde 1

Rådhusstræde 1 is constructed with four storeys over a walk-out basement. The building has a six-bay-long facade on Rådhusstræde (including a wider gateway bay), a seven-bay-long facade on Brolæggerstræde and a chamfered corner. The chamfered corner bay was dictated for all corner buildings by Jørgen Henrich Rawert's and Peter Meyn's guidelines for the rebuilding of the city after the fire so that the fire department's long ladder companies could navigate the streets more easily. The grey, plastered facade is finished with shadow joints on the ground floor and the slightly recessed, central bays of the first floor towards both streets. The facade is finished with a sandstone band between the first and second floor and there is a cornice supported by corbels with acanthus decorations below the roof. The outer windows on the second floor towards both streets are topped by triangular pediments, and the corner window on the same floor is topped by a segmental pediment. The corner windows on the two lower floors are topped by substantial hood moulds supported by corbels. They were topped by wrought iron railings in 1881, creating a visual impression reminiscent of French balconies. The roof is clad with black glazed tiles and features four dormer windows towards both streets and one in the corner.

=== Brolæggerstræde 13 ===
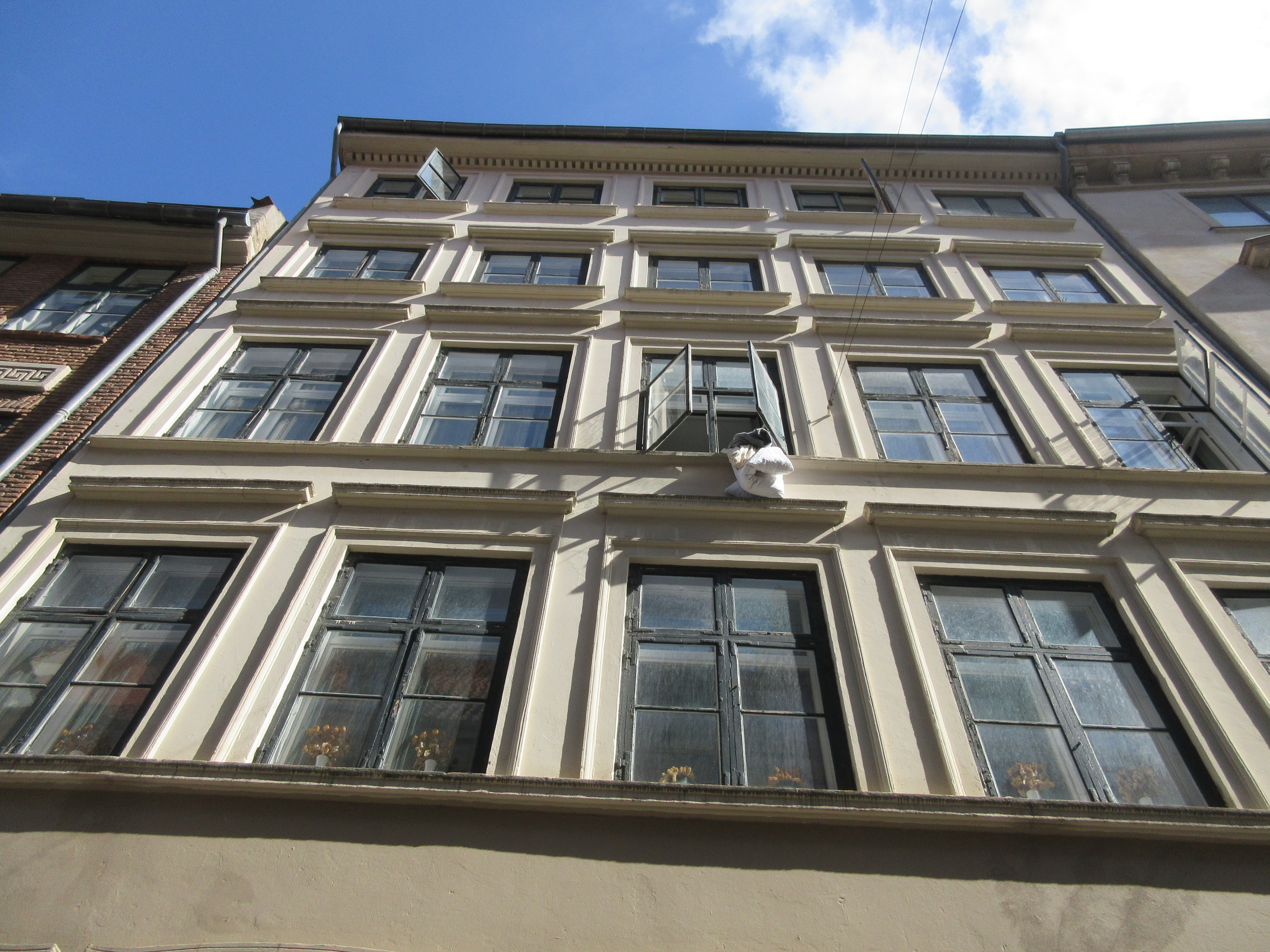
Brolæggerstræde 13

In connection with the 1751 renovation, Brolæggerstræde 13 was converted into a five-storey building by lowering the ground floor almost to street level and changing floor heights. The plastered facade is finished with sill courses below the windows on the first and second floors and a dentillated cornice. Doors are located in the two outer bays, and the slightly recessed ground floor windows between them are placed in each niche. A short perpendicular window projects from the rear side of the building.

== Today ==
Rådhusstræde 1 is currently owned by Bach Gruppen and contains a total of eight commercial and residential units. The ground floor contains a 417 m^{2} (4,490 sq ft) retail space. Posthusteatret, a combined art cinema and theatre (music venue), is based in the basement.

== Cultural references ==
Rådhusstræde 1 was used as a location in the 1963 comedy film Pigen og pressefotografen.

The architect Tobias Faber, who was married to Herluf and Ellen Jensenius' daughter Jytte, described his parents-in-law's home in Rådhusstræde in his memoirs Kom indenfor.

== Gallery ==
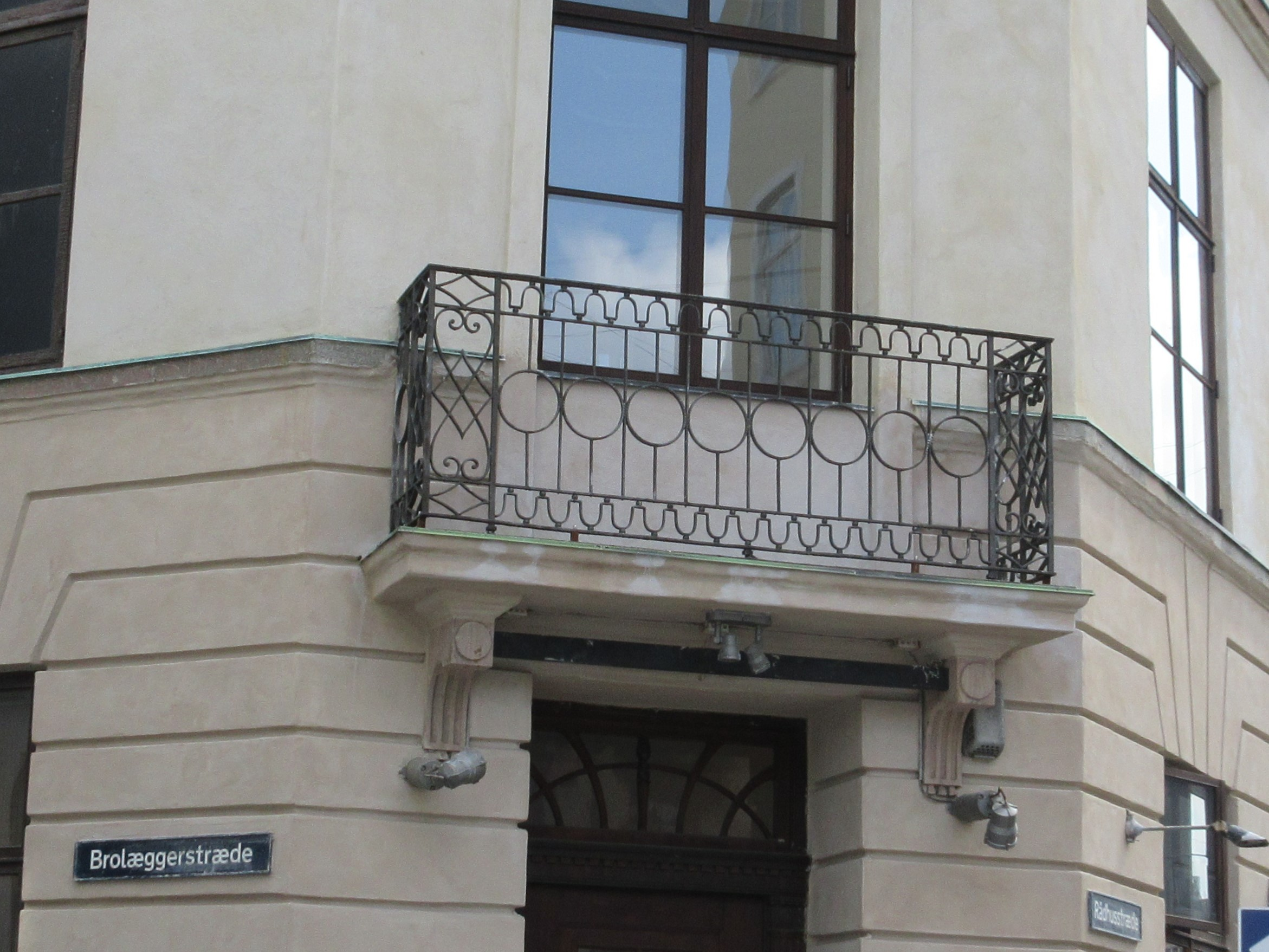
Detail of the iron railing on the first floor
