= Copenhagen City Hall (1728–1795) =

Coordinates: 55.6777°N 12.5729°E

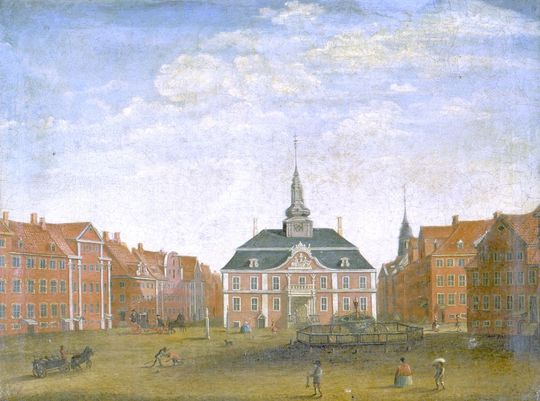
- The City Hall painted by Johannes Rach in c. 1750
- Interactive map of the Copenhagen City Hall area

General information
- Architectural style: Baroque
- Location: Copenhagen, Denmark
- Completed: 1728
- Demolished: 1795

A new, fourth City Hall in Copenhagen, Denmark, was built between Gammeltorv and Nytorv in 1728 on the foundations of its predecessor which had been destroyed in the first Great Fire of Copenhagen earlier that same year. In 1795 it was itself destroyed in the second Great Fire of Copenhagen and later replaced by the new combined city hall and courthouse at Nytorv which was completed in 1815.

== Building ==
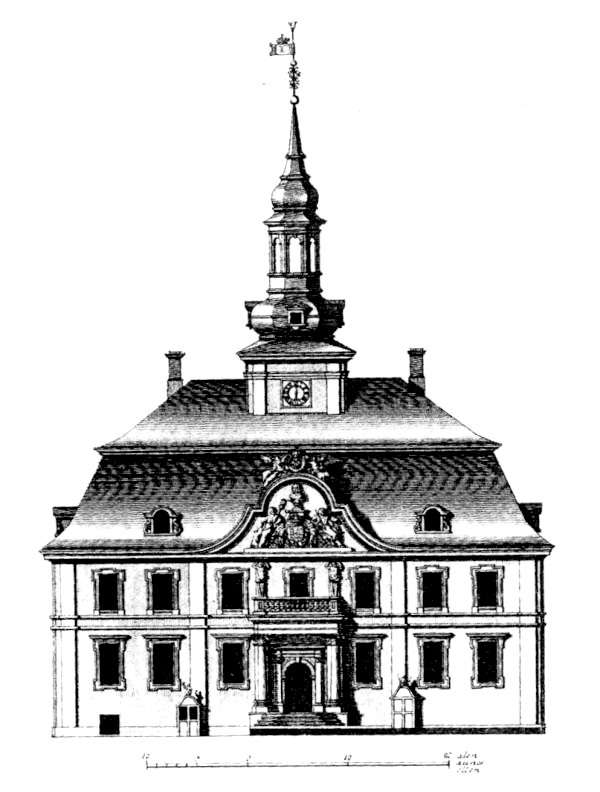
The city hall in Lauritz de Thurah's Hafnia Hodierna (Table XXXIII)

The new city hall was built by Johan Conrad Ernst and Johan Cornelius Krieger and completed already the same year. Seven bays wide, the building consisted of two storeys and a cellar, under a mansard roof topped by a ridge turret. The facade was decorated with statues, columns and a bust of King Christian VI above the royal coat of arms. The rear side of the building had fewer decorations but also featured the royal coat of arms flanked by that of Copenhagen on either side. The rear of the building also had an open gallery similar to that of the old city hall.

== Use ==
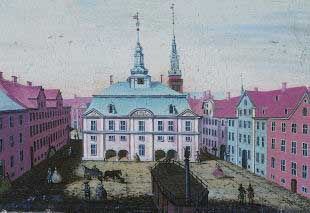
The city hall seen from Nytorv

The city hall was used by the city council and also housed the administration as well as the city's fire guard and police force. As had been the case at least since 1619, the new city hall also served as jail. There were cells both in the cellar, on the ground floor and on first floor.

The cellar also contained a drinking establishment which served both wine and foreign beer. That the magistrate was entitled to run a "town cellar" as this establishment was called, was a tradition which can be traced back to at least Christopher of Bavaria's Stadsret' from 14 October 1443.

== See also ==
- Old City Hall (Aalborg), modeled on the building in Copenhagen
- Copenhagen City Hall, present city hall in Copenhagen
