= Jacob Benzon =

Norwegian judge (1688-1775)

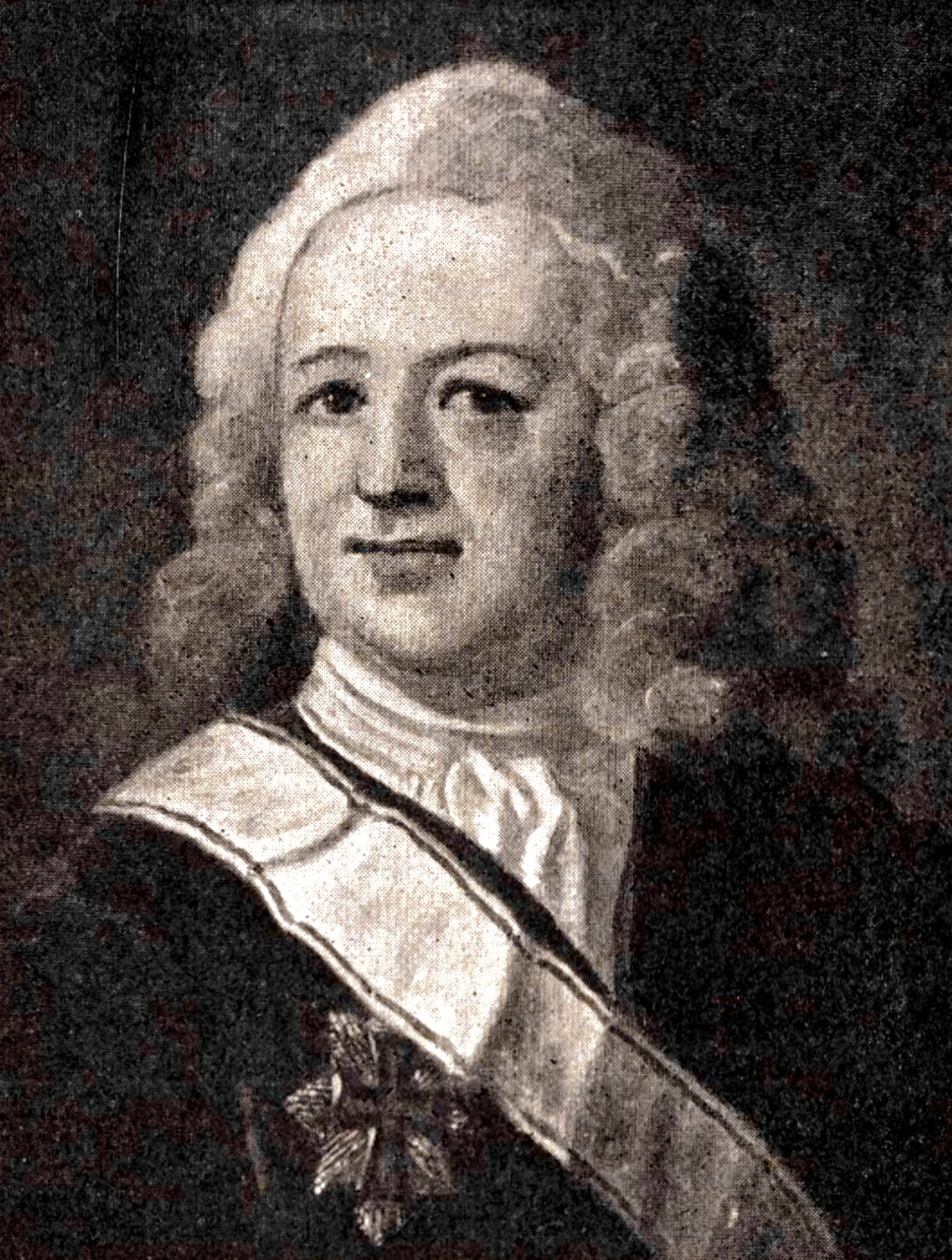

Governor-general of Norway
- In office 11 September 1750 – 8 February 1771
- Preceded by: Christian Rantzau
- Succeeded by: Prince Charles of Hesse-Kassel

Personal details
- Born: 31 October 1688
- Died: 25 November 1775 (aged 87) Aarhus, Denmark
- Awards: Order of the Elephant and Order of the Dannebrog

Jacob Benzon (31 October 1688 – 25 November 1775) was a Danish nobleman, civil servant and Governor-general of Norway.

== Career ==
Benzon's career began as a court junker at the Royal Danish Cavalry Academy in Copenhagen 1704–06. He held various state positions in Copenhagen 1715–1726. In 1726 he became a amtmann of Trondheim in Norway, and from 1730 to 1737 he held the same position in Oslo. He was then amtmann of Aarhus from 1740, President and Vice-Governor of Copenhagen 1747–50 and was from 1750 Vice-Governor-general of Norway.

After Charles of Hesse had been the titular Governor-general of Norway for four years (1766–70) without residing in Norway, Benzon was appointed to Governor-general on 26 January 1770, a position he held for only one year. He was deposed on 8 February 1771, by Johann Friedrich Struensee, leaving the position vacant until 1809.

In the Danish Biographical Lexicon, he is characterized by these statements:

"He had gradually owned a number of manors in Denmark such as Aastrup, Aggersvold and Benzonsdal, which he again sold. He had a considerable wealth, which he, however, was partly regarded as having amassed by a stinginess which was unworthy of him."

"As a Norwegian official for a long number of years, Benzon had acquired both insight into and interest in Norway's special internal affairs, which of course was evident in many ways in his tenure, and he also enjoyed general positive recognition in Norway."

He became a knight of the Order of the Dannebrog in 1731, and a knight of the Order of the Elephant in 1763. Benzon was unmarried, and his fortune was inherited by a nephew.
