= Krabbesholm, Lejre Municipality =

Manor house near Skibby, Denmark

Krabbesholm
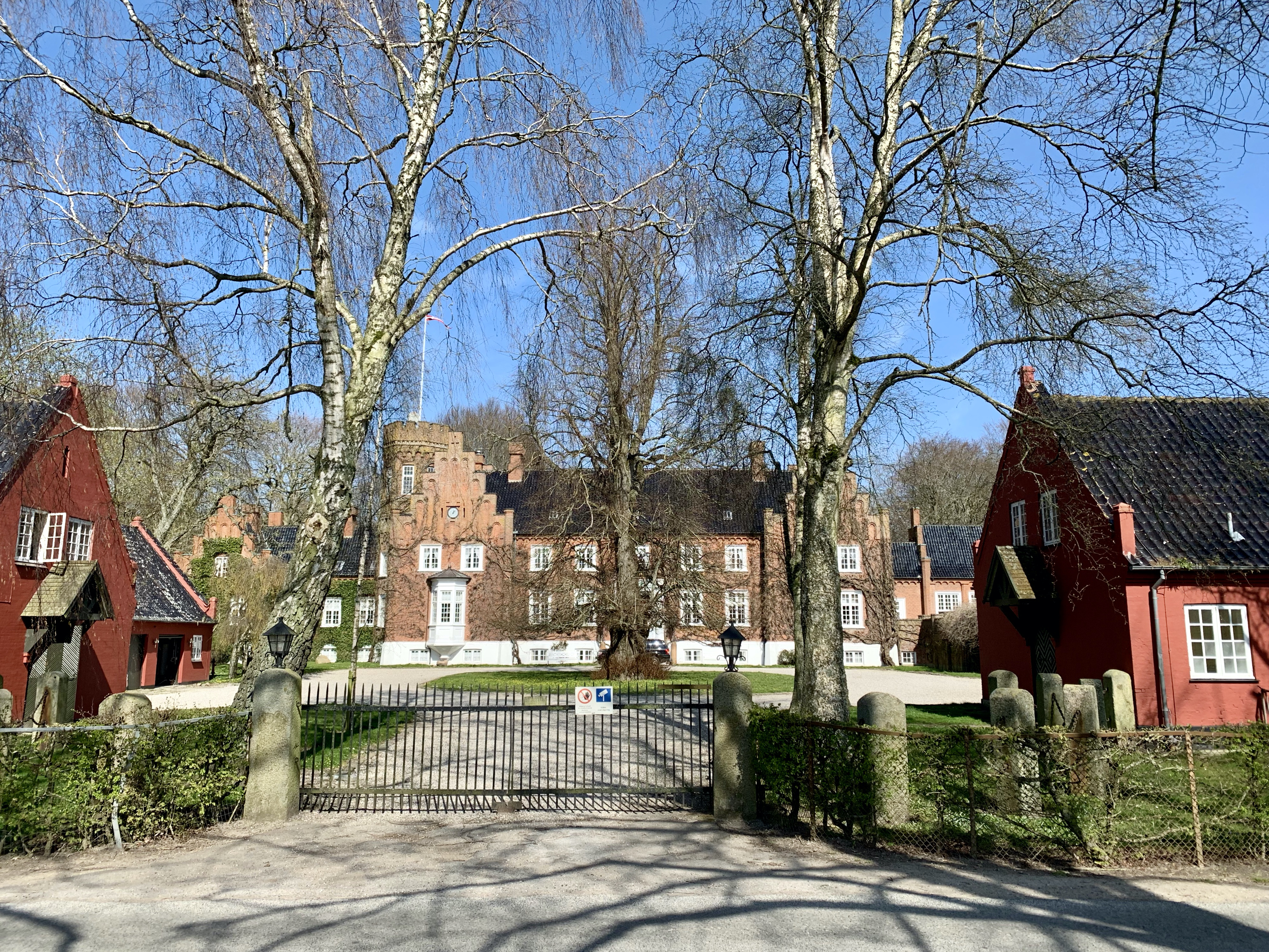
- Krabbesholm in 2020
- Interactive map of the Krabbesholm area

General information
- Location: Krabbesholmvej 14 Abr/> 4070 Kirke Hyllinge, Denmark
- Coordinates: 55°43′48″N 11°57′0″E
- Completed: 1853

Design and construction
- Architect: Frederik Galatius

Krabbesholm is a manor house and estate located on the Hornsherred peninsula, between Skibby and Sæby, Lejre Municipality, some 50 kilometres west of Copenhagen, Denmark. The manor was detached from Egholm by Oluf Rosenkrantz in 1783 but the two estates had the same owners until 1806. The Gothic Revival style main building, the first on the estate, was built for Lars Trolle in 18. The estate covers 488 hectares of land.

== History ==
=== Rosenkrantz and Skeel families ===
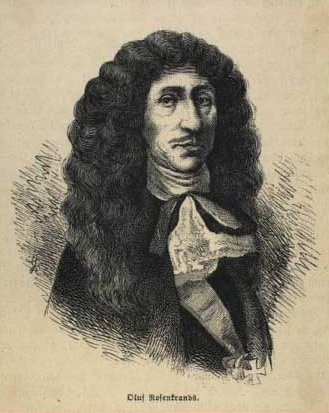
Oluf Rosenkrantz

The village of Vindeby was formerly located on the site. It was destroyed in the First and Second Dano-Swedish Wars. It belonged to Egholm Manor.

Oluf Rosenkrantz inherited Egholm after his father. He later increased the number of tenant farms under the manor to an extent that compromised the rational management of the estate. In 1647 he was granted royal permission to establish a new manor on part of the land. He named his new estate Krabbesholm (Krabbe's Isle) as a tribute to his wife, Birgitte Krabbe.

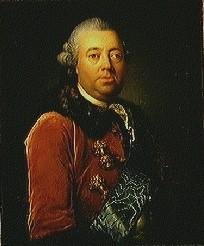
Frederik Christian Rosenkrantz

Rosenkrantz fell out of favour at the court after opposing the new Absolute monarchy and was forced to cede all his estates to his daughters and sons-in-law. Egholm and Krabbesholm were ceded to Mogens Skeel. In 1685, Skeel sold theestates to Otte Skeel. After his death Krabbesholm passed to his son-in-law, Otto Krabbe. Otto Krabbe's and Birgitte Skeel's son in-law, Iver Rosenkrantz, inherited Krabbesholm in 1737. He was after his death in 1745 succeeded by his son Frederik Rosebnkrantz.

Frederik Christian Rosenkrantz inherited the estates in 1763 and was already the owner of Ryegaard, Barritskov and Trudsholm. He endowed his estates to Niels Rosenkrantz with an obligation to establish a stamhus (family trust) from the estates. Stamhuset Rosenkrantz was established from Ryegaard, Barritskov and Trudsholm.

=== 19th century ===
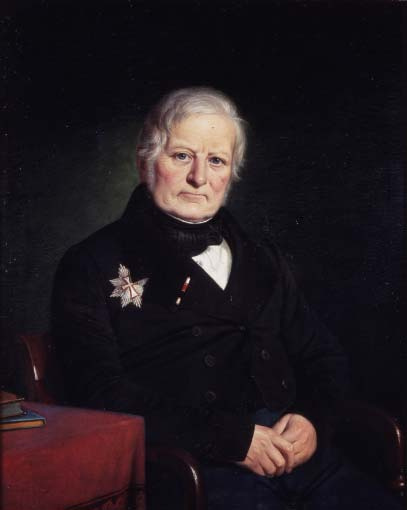
Nicolai Abraham Holten, owned Krabbesholm in 1810-1850

In 1804, Niels Rosenkrantz sold Egholm and Krabbesholm to his brother Marcus Gjøe Rosenkrantz, who just two months later sold them to Christian Conrad, Count of Danneskiold-Samsøe and Lars Lassen. In 1806 the two partners divided the estates between them, leaving Danneskiold-Samsøe as the sole owner of Krabbesholm.

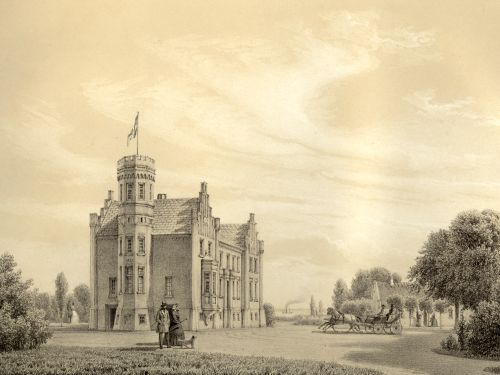
The main building depicted by Ferdinand Richard

In 1810, Krabbesholm was acquired by Nicolai Abraham Holten. Holten, who resided on his other estate, Lindegården, did not construct a main building on the estate. He established the first school in Sæby. Holten died in 1850.

In 1852, Krabbesholm was sold in public auction. The buyer was Lars Trolle. In 1853, he constructed the first main building at Krabbesholm. In 1871, Trolle sold Krabbesholm to Frederik Vilhelm TTreschow.

=== 20th century ===
Treschow 's daughter, Clara Sophie Treschow, who had inherited Krabbesholm in 1876, married Niels Joachim Christian Gregers Juel, a son of Niels Rudolph Juel of Hverringe Manor on Funen. He died in 1938. In 1939, Krabbesholm was sold in public auction for DKK 935,000. The biyer was De Forenede Kulimportører, a importer of coal, coke (fuel)coke and cinders. In 1979, De Forenede Kulimportører was converted into a property company under the name 79- ) Ejendomsselskabet D.F.K. A/S.

== Architecture ==
The main building is designed in Gothic Revival style.

== Estate ==
The estate covers 488 hectares of land. The main building is situated in a large garden with woodland to the north and tree-lined avenues in three directions. A number of protected archeological sites are located on the estate, including a burial mound from the Bronze Age known as Sofiehøh.

== List of owners ==
- (1647-1684) Oluf Rosenkrantz
- (1684-1685) Mogens Skeel
- (1685-1695) Otte Skeel
- (1695-1719) Otto Krabbe
- (1719-1737) Birgitte Skeel, gift Krabbe
- (1737-1745) Iver Rosenkrantz
- (1745-1763) Charlotte Amalie Skeel, gift Rosenkrantz
- (1763-1802) Frederik Christian Rosenkrantz
- (1802-1804) Niels Rosenkrantz
- (1804) Marcus Gjøe Rosenkrantz
- (1804-1806) Lars Lassen
- (1804-1806) Christian Conrad, Count of Danneskiold-Samsøe
- (1806-1810) Peder Nørgaard
- (1806-1810) Poulsen
- (1810-1850) Nicolai Abraham Holten
- (1850-1852) Estate of Nicolai Abraham Holten
- (1852-1871) Lars Trolle
- (1871-1876) Frederik Wilhelm Treschow
- (1876- ) Anna Sophie Treschow, gift Iuel
- ( -1939) Niels Joachim Christian Gregers Iuel
- (1939-1979) A/S De forenede Kulimportører
- (1979- ) Ejendomsselskabet D.F.K. A/S

== See also ==
- Sæby Church, Lejre Municipality
