= Secretary of War (disambiguation) =

Secretary of War was a cabinet office in the United States government from 1789 to 1947.

Secretary of War may also refer to:

- Confederate States Secretary of War
- Secretary of War (Mexico)
- Secretary of War (Denmark)
- Secretary of State for War
- Secretary of State for War and the Colonies, a British cabinet post often shortened to Secretary of War
- United States Secretary of Defense, secondarily titled "Secretary of War" under Executive Order 14347

== See also ==
- Secretary at War, British government position
