= Ryegaard =

Manor house in Lejre, Denmark

Coordinates: 55°40′20″N 11°51′56″E

Ryegaard is a manor house and estate in Lejre Municipality, Denmark. Ryegaard and neighbouring Trudsholm have been owned by the Rosenkrantz/Skeel families since the year 1735. The two estates add up to a combined area of 1,228 hectares.

== History ==
=== Lunge family 1330–1421 ===
The estate traces its history back to the middle of the 14th century. The first Ruegaard was located in the no longer existing of village of Rue (Ryeby), just west of the still existing Rye Church. The estate first mentioned in 1350, when Folmer Jakobsen Lunge acquired it from the Crown in exchange for his holdings in Hammer and Bårse.

The next owner was his brother Jakob Olufsen Lunge (died 1387), a member of the privy council. After his death, ownership was divided between his four children (Oluf Anders, Regitze and Folmer). In 1403 in 1387, Rye was initially passed to his eldest son Oluf Olufsen Lunge. When he also died, it was transferred to his brother Anders Jacobsen Lunge (2/3) and sister Regitze Olufsdatter Lunge (1/3). In 1404, it was bought by their brother Golmer Oludsen Lunge. Folmer Jacobsen Lunge bought his sibling's stakes in the estate. Holmer Jacobsen Lunge was married three times. His daughter Sophie Golmersdatter Lunge (by his wife Regitze Stigsdatter Krognos) inherited the estate after her father's death in 1412.

=== Changing owners, 1421 –1735 ===
In 1421, Sophie Folmersdatter Lunge was married to Claus Serlin (Cernin; 1385–1456). After his death, Ryegaard passed to Otte Alretsen Selin and then to his daughter Sophie Clausdatter Serlin. She married David Arildsen in 1452. Having no children, they bequeathed Ryegård to a grandson of Serlin, Niels Clausen, who was Bishop of Aarhus. The next owner was Erik Eriksen Banner. His son, Frantz Banner, inherited the estate in 1554. He began the construction of a new main building after the old one was destroyed by fire in 1569. He also increased the size of the estate through the acquisition of more land.

In 1573, Banner ceded Ryegaard to the Crown in exchange for property in Jutland. Later in the same year, it was sold to Johanne Oxe. Ryegaard had at some point been granted status of a birk, but Frants Banner had unlawfully retained this authority and the estate therefore lost its status of birk in 1586.

It is unclear what happened to Ryegaard after Johanne Oxe's death in 1586 but the estate was most likely ceded to either Johan Barnekow or his widow Anne Pedersdatter Bille since it is known that it was later owned by their daughter Sophie Barnekow. Sophie Barnekow's husband, Eiler Gyldenstiernes, sold the estate to Axel Urne in 1622. Axel Urne's widow, Birgitte Gyldenstierne, sold it in 1640,

=== Trolle family, 1540–1735 ===
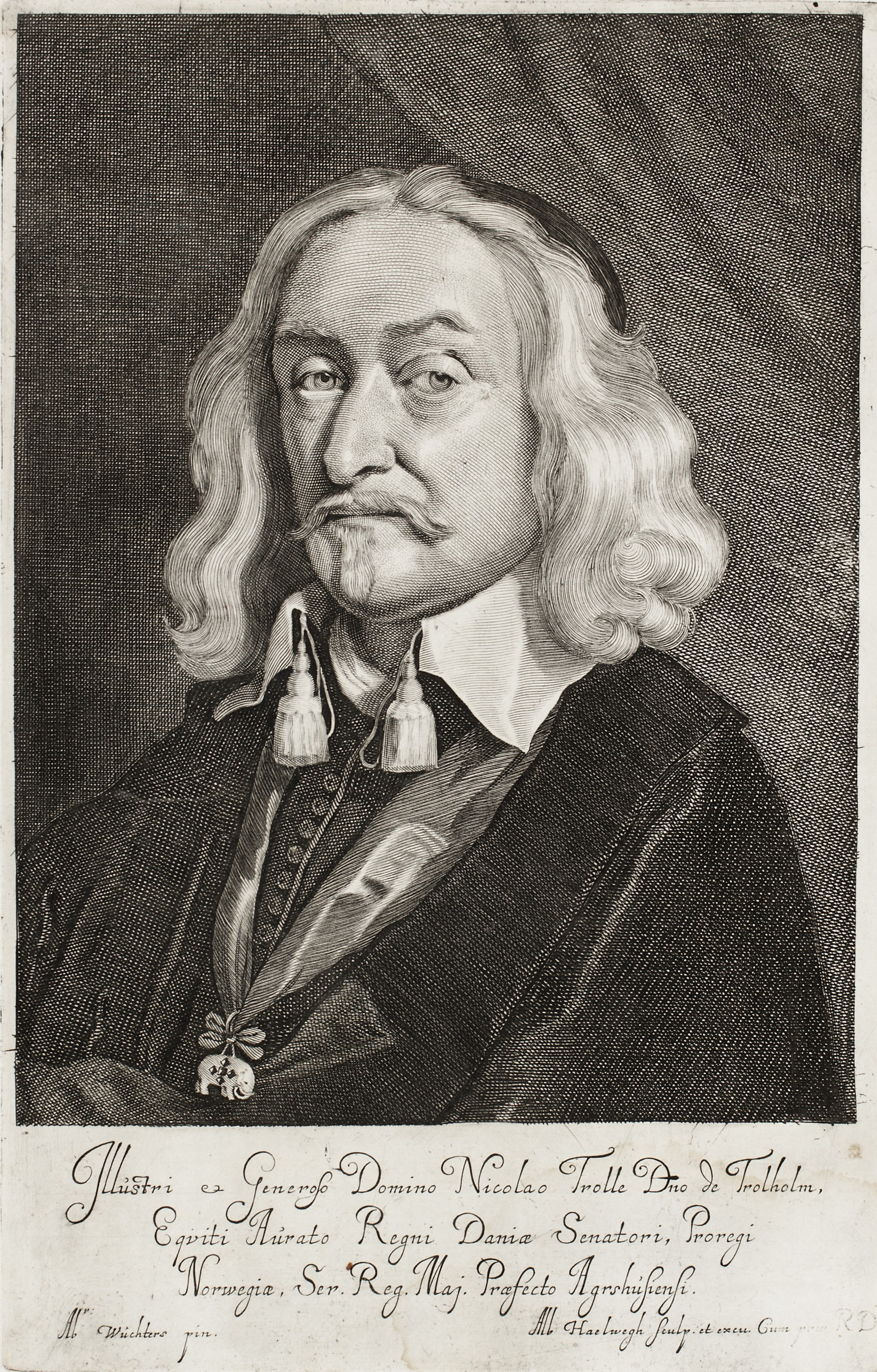
Niels Trolle.

The new owner was Niels Trolle. His other holdings included Trollholm, Jonstrup and Snedinge on Zealand, Krumstrup on Funen and Pallesbjerg in Jutland. During his ownership, Ruegaard was again expanded. This enabled him to restore Ryegaard's status as a birk.

After Niels Trolle's death, Ryegaard passed to his son, Holger Trolle, who also added more land. After Holger Trolle's death, Ryegaard passed to his son and daughter-in-law. Their son, Knud Trolle, sold the estate in 1735.

=== Rosenkrantz and Skeel families ===
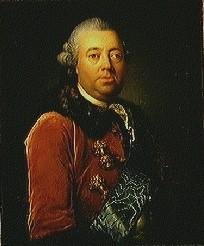
Frederik Christian Rosenkrantz

The new owner was Iver Rosenkrantz. His widow, Charlotte Amalie Skeel, kept the estate after her husband's death in 1745.

Their son, Frederik Christian Rosenkrantz, who later served as prime minister, inherited the estate after his mother's death in 1763. He was also the owner of Krabbesholm, Egholm, Barritskov and Trudsholm.

In 1783, Rosenkrantz was granted a license to establish a tannery on the estate. It was operated by water power. The tannery remained in use until the middle of the 19th century.

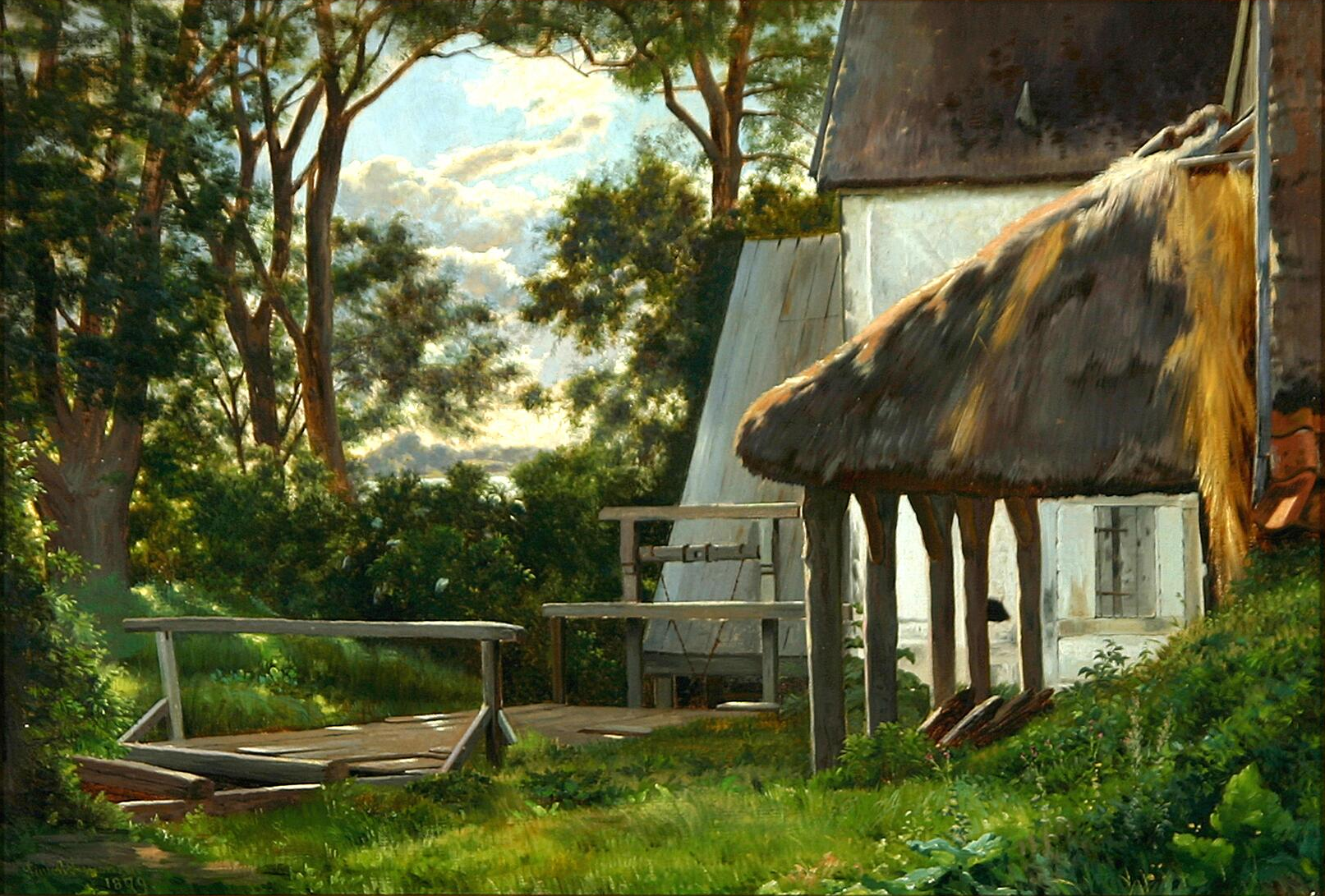
Simon Simonsen: The Tannery Mill at Langtved Ferry Inn, 1879.

Frederik Christian Rosenkrantz endowed his estates to Niels Rosenkrantz, with an obligation to establish a stamhus (family trust) from the estates. Stamhuset Rosenkrantz was established from Ryegaard, Barritskov and Trudsholm while Egholm and Krabbesholm were sold to his brother Marcus Gøye Rosenkrantz.

Niels Rosenkrantz died without children in 1824. Stamhuset Rosenkrantz was therefore passed to his relative Henrik Jørgen Scheel.

In 1862, Ruegaard passed to Frederik Christian Rosenkrantz Scheel. Over the next almost twenty years, he demolished all the existing buildings (except for a barn from 1656). A dower house for his mother was already completed in 1862. A new main building was completed in 1880. It was designed in the Gothic Revival style with crow-stepped gables.

After Frederik Christian Rosenkrantz Scheel's daughter, in 1912, Stamhuset Rosenkrantz passed to his son, Henrik Jørgen Scheel, who died in 1917 and was succeeded by Frederik Christian Scheel. The adoption of the lensafløsningslov in 1919 meant that Stamhuset Rosenkrantz was dissolved with effect from 1923. As another consequence of the act, Ryegaard also had to cede 158.1 hectare of land to the government in 1921 and another 29.9 hectares in 1926.

== Today ==
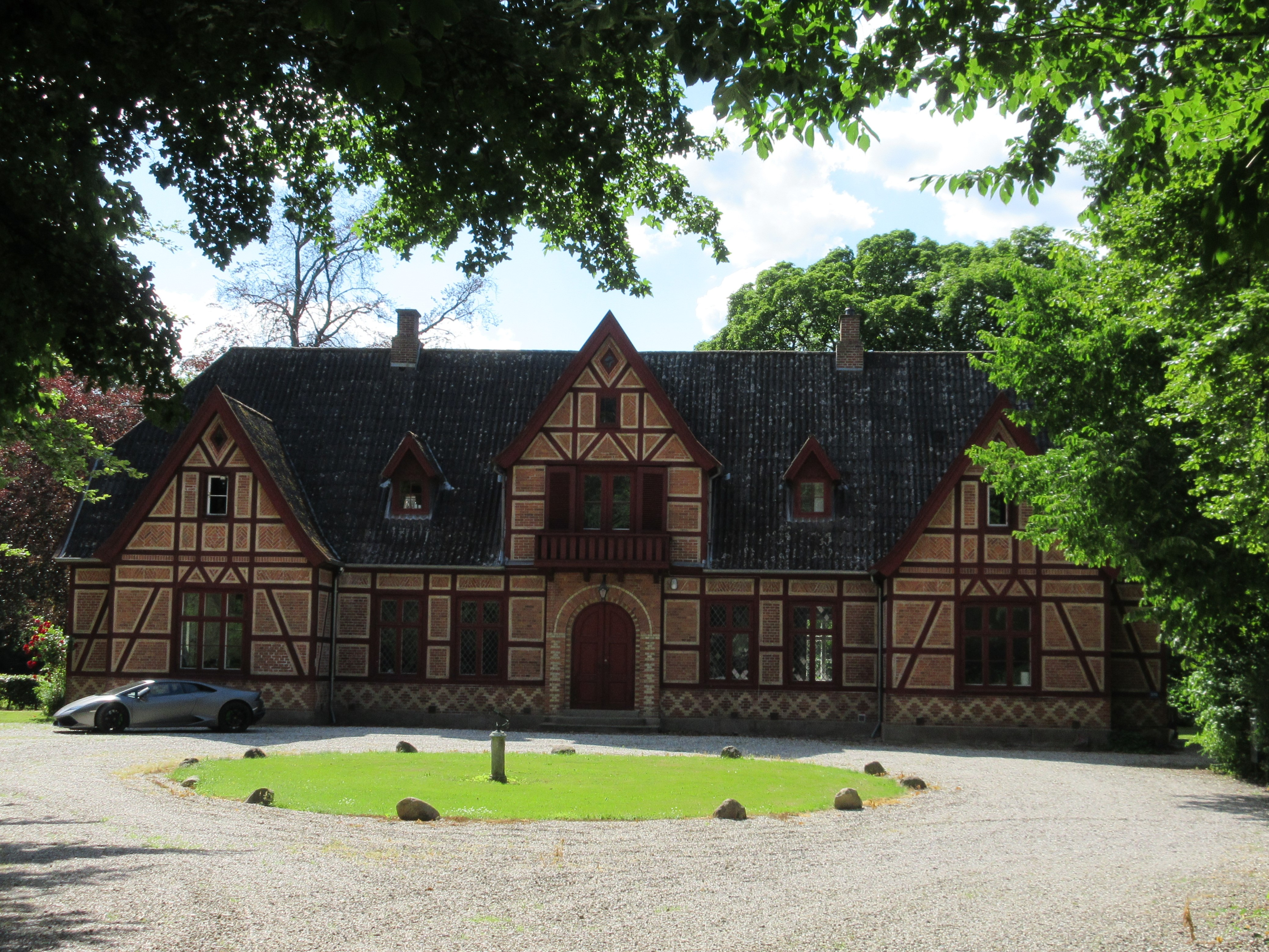
The dower house from 1862.

Ryegaard and Trudsholm are today owned by Johan Christian Rosenkrantz Scheel. The two estates have a combined area of 1,228 hectares.

== List of owners ==
- ( -1350) Kronen
- (1350- ) Folmer Folmersen
- ( -1387) Jacob Olufsen Lunge
- (1387–1403) Oluf Jacobsen Lunge
- (1387–1403) Anders Jacobsen Lunge
- (1387–1403) Regitze Jacobsdatter Lunge
- (1387–1412) Folmer Jacobsen Lunge
- (1412–1421) Sophie Folmersdatter Serlin (née Lunge)
- (1421–1450) Claus Serlin
- (1450–1452) Sophie Clausdatter Arildsen (née Serlin)
- (1452–1493) David Arildsen
- (1493–1533) Niels Clausen
- (1533–1554) Erik Eriksen Banner
- (1554–1573) Frants Banner
- (1573) The Crown
- (1573–1581) Johanne Oxe
- (1581- ) Boet efter Johanne Oxe
- ( - ) Anne Pedersdatter Barnekow (née Bille)
- ( -1622) Eiler Gyldenstierne
- (1622–1626) Axel Urne
- (1626–1640) Birgitte Urne (née Gyldenstierne)
- (1640–1667) Niels Trolle
- (1667–1686) Holger Trolle
- (1686–1709) Christian Trolle
- (1709–1734) Hilleborg (Trolle (née Gyldenstierne)
- (1734–1735) Knud Trolle
- (1735–1745) Iver Rosenkrantz
- (1745–1763) Charlotte Amalie Rosenkrantz (née Skeel)
- (1763–1802) Frederik Christian Rosenkrantz
- (1802–1824) Niels Rosenkrantz
- (1824–1862) Henrik Jørgen Scheel
- (1862–1912) Frederik Christian Rosenkrantz Scheel
- (1912–1917) Henrik Jørgen Scheel
- (1917–1962) Frederik Christian Rosenkrantz Scheel
- (1962–1998) Niels Henrik Rosenkrantz Scheel
- (1991- ) Johan Christian Rosenkrantz Scheel
