= Secretary of War (Denmark) =

- Overkrigssekretær
- Longest serving Carl von Holstein; August 1746–6 February 1763
- Reports to: The King
- Appointer: The King
- Formation: 1688
- First holder: Jens Harboe
- Final holder: Frederik Christian Rosenkrantz (Army); Christian Conrad Danneskiold-Laurvig (Navy)
- Abolished: 10 December 1770

The Secretary of War (Danish: Overkrigssekretær, lit. 'Supreme War Secretary') was from 1688 the administrative leader of the military in Denmark-Norway. In 1736, it was divided into separate offices for the Army and the Navy and was dissolved as part of Johann Friedrich Struensee's administrative reforms in 1770.

== List of office holders ==
=== Secretary of War ===
Danish: Overkrigssekretærer for Land- og Søetaten

| No. | Portrait | Name (Born-Died) | Term of office | | | Monarch | Ref. |
| No. | Portrait | Name (Born-Died) | Took office | Left office | Time in office | Monarch | Ref. |
|---|---|---|---|---|---|---|---|
| 1 | Jens Harboe [da] | Jens Harboe (1646–1709) | 11 August 1688 | 28 August 1699 | 11 years | Christian V | – |
| 2 | Christian von Lente [da] | Christian von Lente (1649–1725) | 28 August 1699 | May 1710 | 10 years, 8 months | Frederick IV | – |
| 3 | Valentin von Eickstedt [da] | Major general Valentin von Eickstedt (1669–1718) | May 1710 | 3 May 1717 | 7 years | Frederick IV | – |
| 4 | Christian Carl Gabel | Vice admiral Christian Carl Gabel (1669–1718) | 6 June 1717 | 18 October 1725 | 8 years, 4 months | Frederick IV | |
| 5 | Johan Christoph von Körbitzl [da] | Major general Johan Christoph von Körbitzl (?–1726) | October 1725 | 24 December 1726 † | 1 year, 2 months | Frederick IV | – |
| 6 | Ditlev Revenfeld [da] | Major general Ditlev Revenfeld (1684–1746) | January 1727 | October 1730 | 3 years, 9 months | Frederick IV | – |
| 7 | Poul Vendelbo Løvenørn | General; Poul Vendelbo Løvenørn (1686–1740) | October 1730 | 23 November 1735 | 5 years, 1 month | Christian VI | – |

=== Secretary of War for the Army ===
Danish: Overkrigssekretærer for Landetaten

| No. | Portrait | Name (Born-Died) | Term of office | | | Monarch | Ref. |
| No. | Portrait | Name (Born-Died) | Took office | Left office | Time in office | Monarch | Ref. |
|---|---|---|---|---|---|---|---|
| 1 | Poul Vendelbo Løvenørn | General; Poul Vendelbo Løvenørn (1686–1740) | 23 November 1735 | 27 February 1740 | 4 years, 3 months | Christian VI | – |
| 2 | Michael Numsen [da] | General; Michael Numsen (1686–1757) | 27 February 1740 | August 1746 | 6 years, 5 months | Christian VI | – |
| 3 | Count Christian Lerche [da] | General; Count Christian Lerche (1692–1757) | August 1746 | 1753 | 6–7 years | Frederick V | – |
| 4 | Count Werner von der Schulenburg [da] | Field Marshal; Count Werner von der Schulenburg (1679–1755) | 1753 | 7 September 1755 † | 1–2 years | Frederick V | – |
| 5 | Count Conrad Ahlefeldt [da] | General; Count Conrad Ahlefeldt (1707–1791) | September 1755 | October 1763 | 8 years, 1 month | Frederick V | – |
| 6 | Claude Louis, Comte de Saint-Germain | Field marshal Claude Louis, Comte de Saint-Germain (1707–1778) | 28 October 1763 | 28 January 1766 | 2 years, 3 months | Frederick V | – |
| 7 | Frederik Christian Rosenkrantz | Frederik Christian Rosenkrantz (1707–1778) | 28 January 1766 | 10 December 1770 | 4 years, 10 months | Christian VII | – |

=== Secretary of War for the Navy ===
Danish: Overkrigssekretærer for Søetaten

| No. | Portrait | Name (Born-Died) | Term of office | | | Monarch | Ref. |
| No. | Portrait | Name (Born-Died) | Took office | Left office | Time in office | Monarch | Ref. |
|---|---|---|---|---|---|---|---|
| 1 | Frederik Danneskiold-Samsøe | General-Admiral-Lieutenant; Frederik Danneskiold-Samsøe (1703–1770) | 23 November 1735 | August 1746 | 10 years, 8 months | Christian VI | |
| 2 | Carl von Holstein [da] | Carl von Holstein (1700–1763) | August 1746 | 6 February 1763 † | 16 years, 6 months | Frederick V | – |
| 3 | Frederik Christian Rosenkrantz | Frederik Christian Rosenkrantz (1707–1778) | February 1763 | January 1766 | 2 years, 11 months | Frederick V | – |
| (1) | Frederik Danneskiold-Samsøe | General-Admiral-Lieutenant; Frederik Danneskiold-Samsøe (1703–1770) | 25 August 1766 | 26 October 1767 | 1 year, 2 months | Christian VII | |
| 4 | Christian Conrad Danneskiold-Laurvig [da] | Admiral; Christian Conrad Danneskiold-Laurvig (1723–1783) | 28 October 1767 | 18 September 1770 | 2 years, 10 months | Christian VII | |
