= Sæby Church, Lejre Municipality =

Church building in Lejre Municipality, Denmark

Coordinates: 55°42′17″N 11°56′20″E

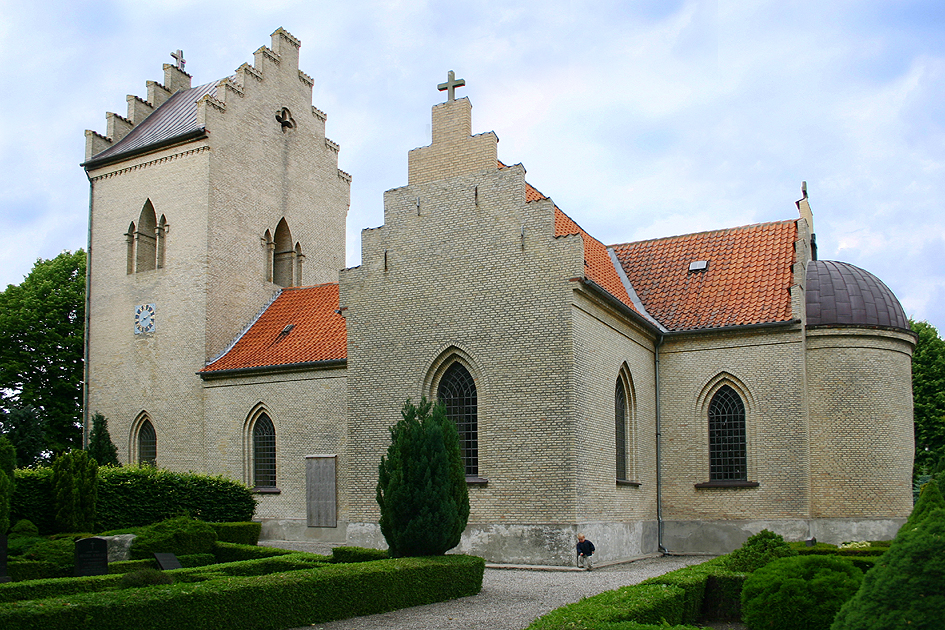
Sæby Church

Sæby Church (Danish: Sæby Kirke) is located in the small village of Sæby on the Hornsherred peninsula, Lejre Municipality, some 50 km west of Copenhagen, Denmark. Originating in a Romanesgue church from the 13th century, later expanded with a Gothic tower, it owes its current appearance to a renovation undertaken by Jørgen Hansen Koch in 1824.

== History ==
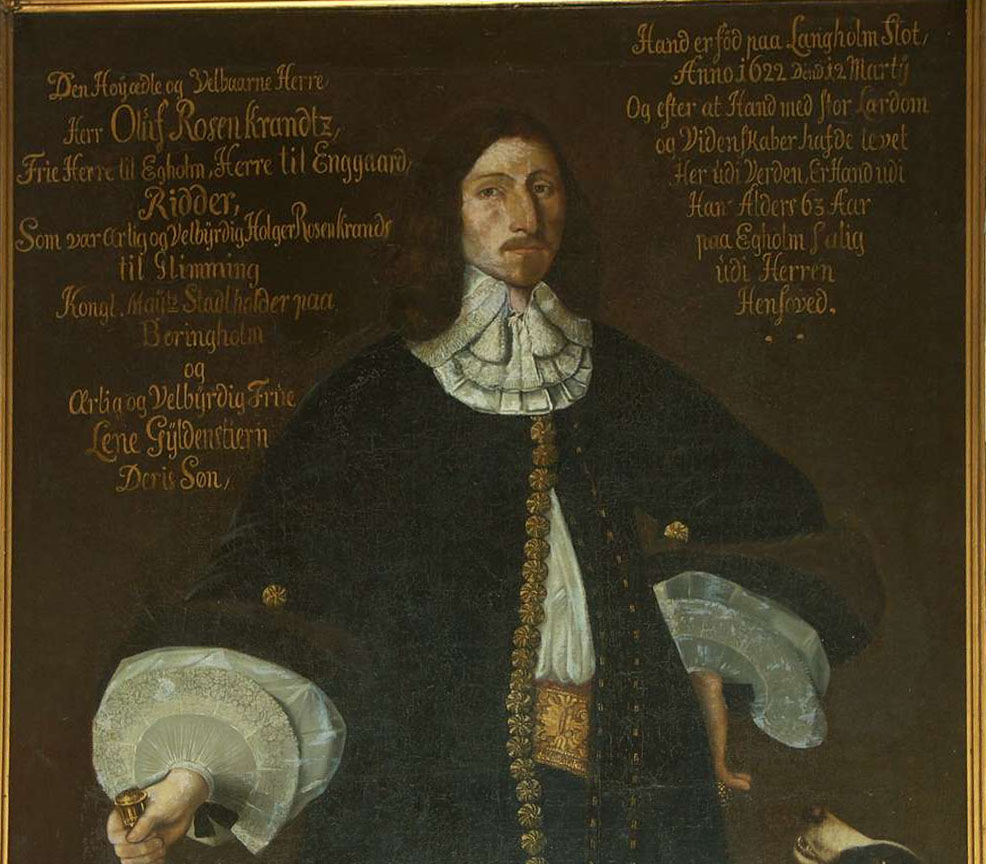
Oluf Rosenkrantz seen on a painting in the church

The Romanesque church was constructed in the 13th century. Nothing is known about its ownership in the Middle Ages. After the Reformation, it was confiscated by the Crown. In 1650, it was sold to Oluf Rosenkrantz, the owner of nearby Egholm. He would later also purchase Gershøj and Skibby churches.

In 1810, along with Krabbesholm, it was sold to Nicolai Abraham Holten. In 1824, Holten commissioned Jørgen Hansen Koch to expand the church.

A new rectory was in c. 1830 constructed next to the church. It was possibly sponsored by the wealthy industrialist Heinrich Gamst. after Johan Frederik Storck, who married Gamst's niece Charlotte Kund, in 1830, had received appointment as pastor at the church the previous year.

On 1 January 1909, it was ceded to the congregation.

== Architecture ==
The church building consists of a Romanesque nave, a Gothic tower from the 15th century and an eastern cruciform extension with chancel and apse from 1824. The older parts of the building was in connection with Koch's renovation dressed with yellow brick, similar to those used for the new part of the building.

== Interior and furnishings ==
The interior walls of the nave feature two plaster reliefs by Herman Wilhelm Bissen, depicting "Christ with the Small Children" (north wall) and "Lazarus awakening" (south wall).

The empire-style pulpit was designed by Jørgen Hansen Koch. It has a cylindrical shape and is white lacquered with gilded details.

The altarpiece features a tall, narrow painting by Christoffer Wilhelm Eckersberg, depicting the resurrected Jesus, in an arch-headed frame with gilded arcanthus ornamentation.

== Graveyard ==
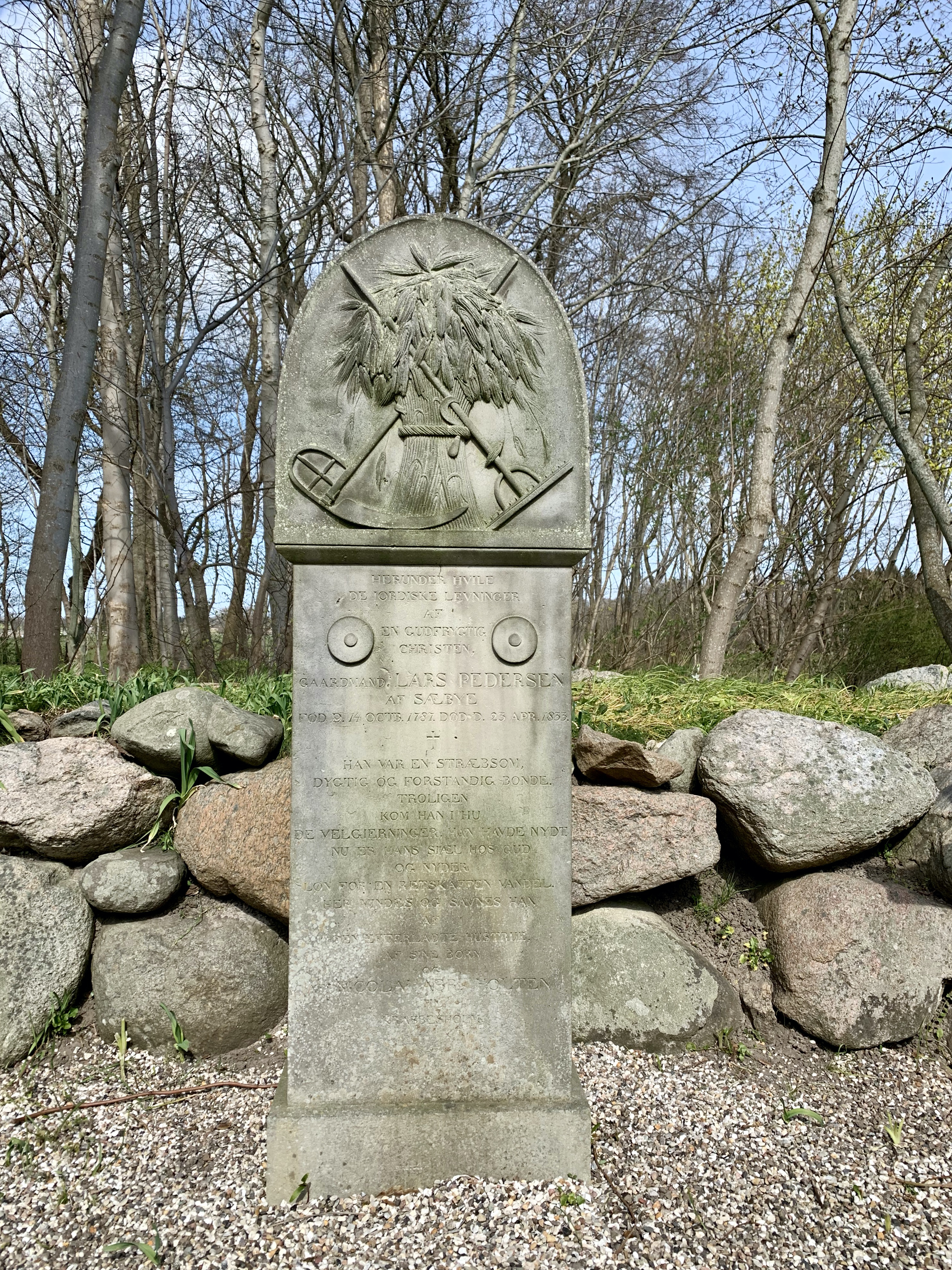
Lars Pedersen's headstone

The layout of the graveyard has not changed since the renovation of the church in 1824. In the northeastern corner of the graveyard stands a memorial to the farmer Lars Pedersen from Hyllingeledsgården, who died in 1833, It was erected by N. A. Holten to designs by the prominent sculptor Hermann Ernst Freund.

== See also ==
- List of churches in Lejre Municipality
