= Charlotte Amalie Skeel =

Danish noble (1700–1763)

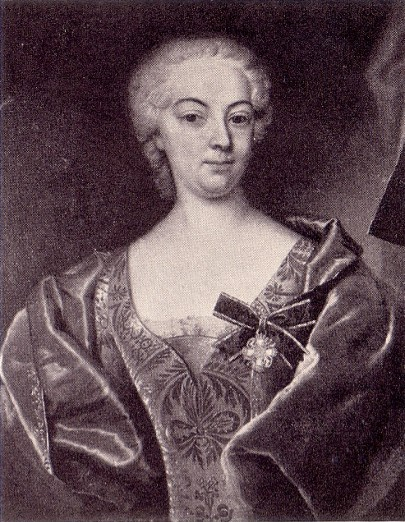
Charlotte Amalie Skeel wearing Ordre de l'Union Parfaite

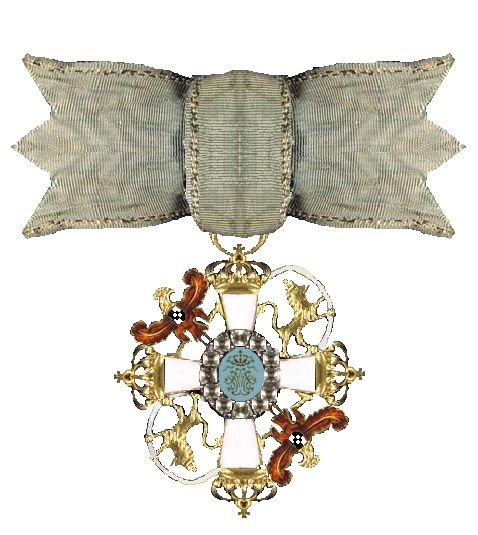
Ordre de l'Union Parfaite

Charlotte Amalie Skeel (1700-1763), was a Danish noble. She was the object of a famous scandal of the royal court.

Skeel was the issue of Christen Skeel (1663-1709) and Charlotte Amalie von Plessen (1683-1760). In 1721, she married Iver Rosenkrantz, and became the mother of Frederik Christian Rosenkrantz, among others.

Charlotte Amalie Skeel was known at court for her love life. In 1734, shortly after Christmas 1733, a scandal occurred, when her current admirer, Captain Ahlenfeldt, arrived to her bed chamber to discover her already in the company of a rival, Count Frederik Conrad von Holstein. Ahlenfelt wounded Holstein with his sword, and engaged in a spontaneous duel with Holstein. Skeel was forced to separate them with the use of her servants. Despite efforts to keep the incident secret, the scandal could not be prevented.

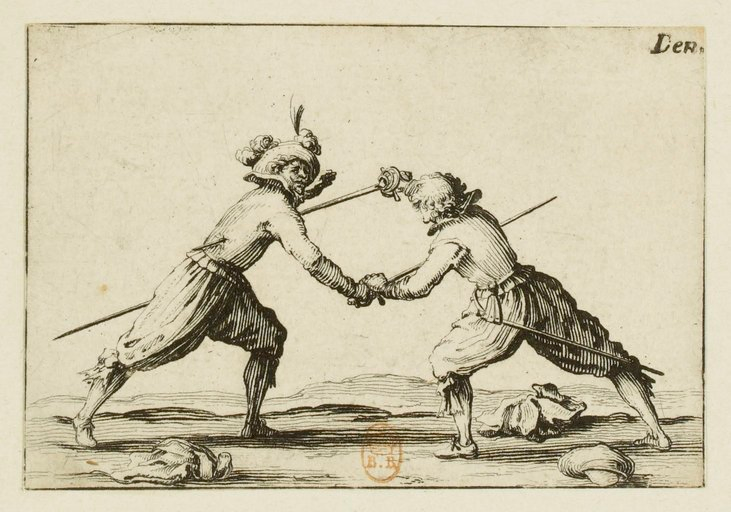
"A Duel", graveur print, by Jacques Callot (1592-1635)

This created a crisis at court, as the present monarch and his consort, Christian VI of Denmark and Sophia Magdalene, were strict followers of pietism, and was in danger of damaging the political position of her spouse at the royal council as it placed him in conflict with the king and queen and their strict religious circle. Ahlenfelt was exiled from the royal court in disgrace. To avoid being banished herself, Skeel wrote a letter of excuse to the monarch. The letter was delivered to the King by her spouse, who stood by her side during the incident.

Charlotte Amalie Skeel was made a Dame of the Ordre de l'Union Parfaite in 1750.
