= Løvenørn (noble family) =

Danish and Norwegian noble family

(de) Løvenørn
- Noble family
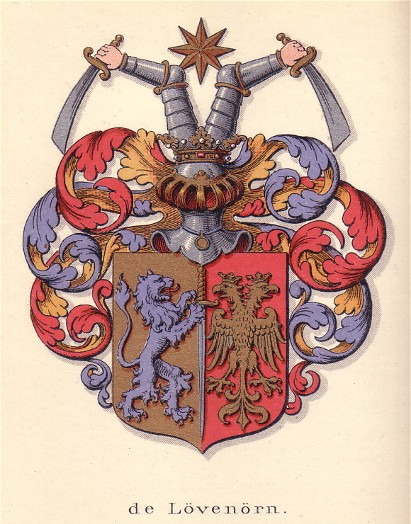
- Country: Denmark; Norway
- Founded: 14 January 1711
- Founder: Poul Vendelbo Løvenørn

The Løvenørn family, also spelled de Løvenørn, was a Danish and Norwegian noble family.

== History ==
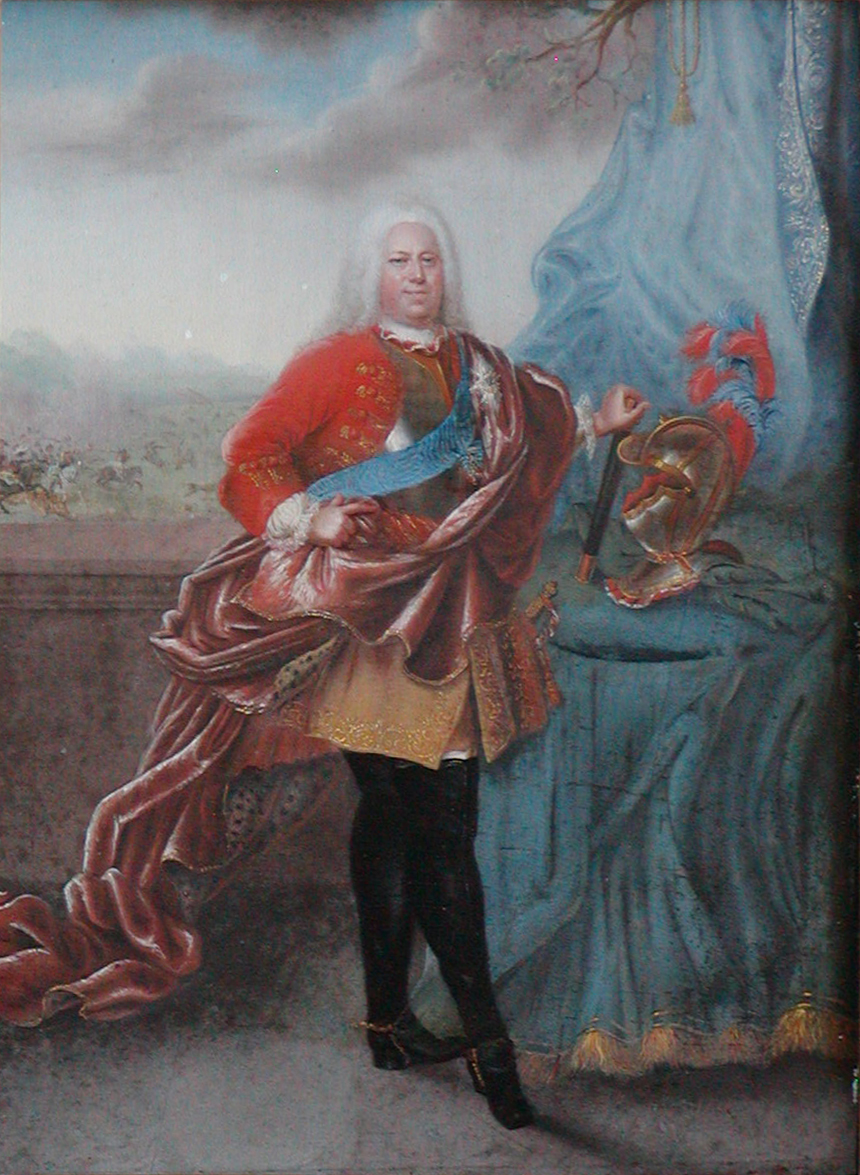
Poul Vendelbo Løvenørn

Poul Vendelbo (1686–1740) was on 14 January 1711 ennobled under the name Løvenørn (lit. Lion Eagle). Among his descendants were his son Frederik de Løvenørn (1715–1779) and grandson, naval officer and hydrographer Poul de Løvenørn (1751–1826). Later generations included diplomat Poul Ludvig Ernst de Løvenørn (1839–1922).

== Gallery ==
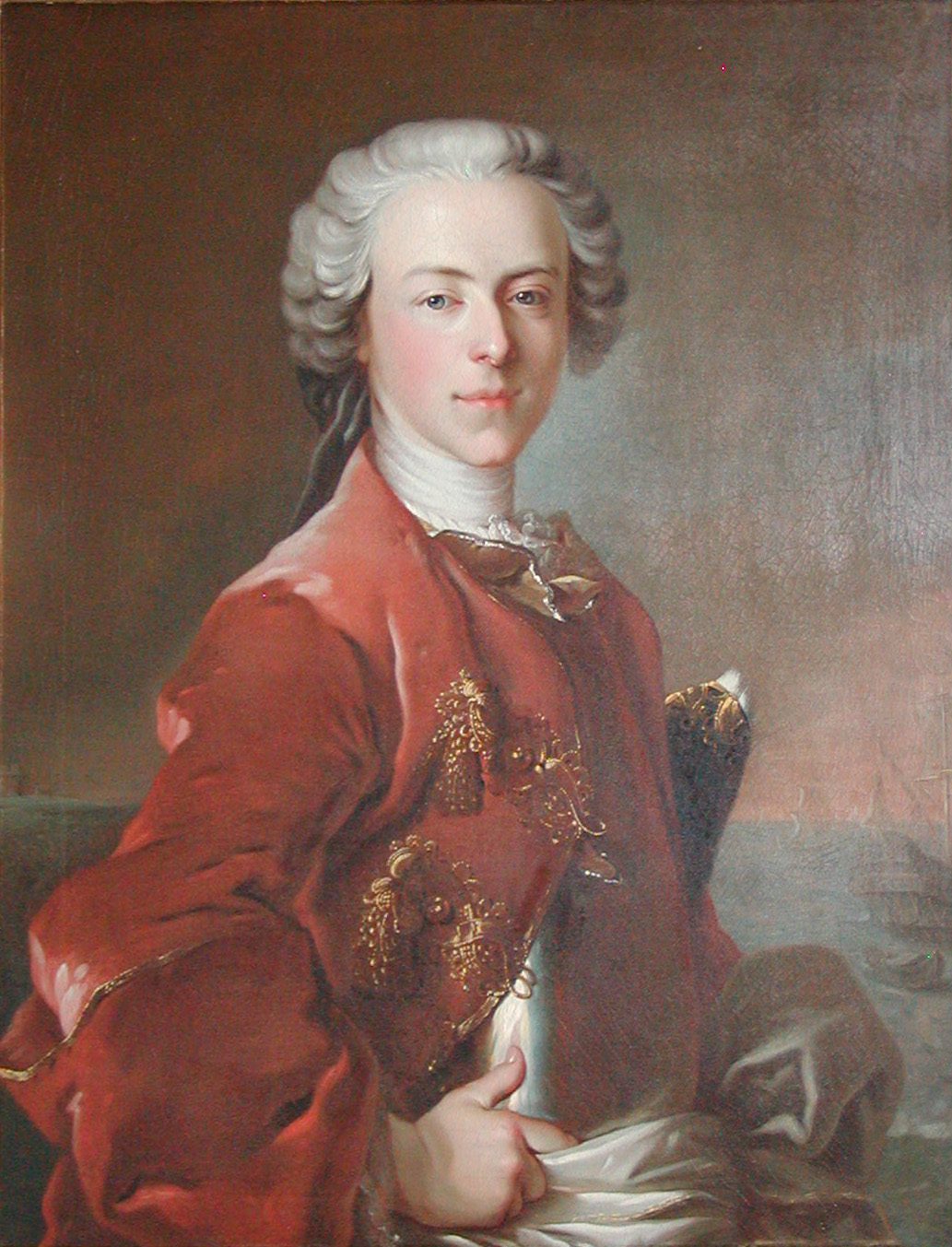
Frederik Løvenørn (1715–1779)

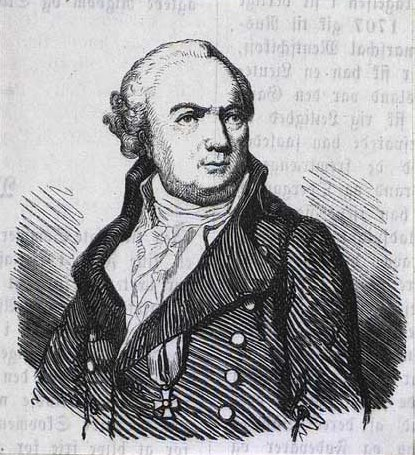
Poul de Løvenørn (1751–1826)

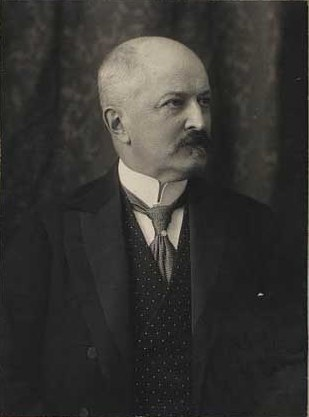
Poul Ludvig Ernst de Løvenørn (1839–1922)

== Coat of arms ==
Description: In a shield divided into a yellow field and a red field by a downwards turned sword, in the 1st field an against left [sinister?] directed blue lion rampant, holding the sword, and in the 2nd field a crowned gold double eagle. On the helm a noble coronet, whereupon an eight-pointed golden star between two arms dressed in armour, each holding a downwards turned sable.

== See also ==
- Danish nobility
- Norwegian nobility

== Literature and sources ==
- Wikipedia, Danish.
- Poul Bredo Grandjean (1915): Løvenørn
