= Frants Banner =

Danish landowner

Frants Banner (died 24 July 1575) was a Danish landowner and lensmann.

== Biography ==
Frants Banner was the son of Marshal of the Realm and privy counsellor Erik Eriksen Banner (c. 1484 – 1554) and Mette Rosenkrantz (død 1533). He is first mentioned in 1546 as lensmann of the provost in Aarhus and was possibly then part of the administration.

In 1548, he took part in Princess Anna's wedding procession to Sachsen. He was lensmann of Holbæk from 1550. After his father's death I 1554 he took over his father's fief Kalø instead and finally Børglum kloster in 1557–1574. In the Northern Seven Years' War, he served as a ritmester of the Jutland Cacalry.

He married Anne Johansdatter Oxe /buried 4 May 1581 in Torslev Church), a daughter of Johan Oxe of Nielstrup (died 1534) and Mette Gøye (død ca. 1537).

He inherited Kokkedal from his father and Ryegaard from his mother. In 1573, he ceded Ryegaard to the Crown in exchange for Ø Kloster in Jutland. He renamed Ø Kloster Oxholm as a tribute to his wife's family. His family ties to his brother-in-law Peder Oxe have probably secured him a better position than he would otherwise have had.
