= De Forenede Kulimportører =

Danish company

De Forenede kulimportører (literally "United Coal Importers"), often shortened D. F. K., was an importer of coal, coke and cinders. established in 1907 in Copenhagen, Denmark. The company operated its own shipping company as under the name D/S De Forenede Kulimportører from 1924. The company is now operated as a property company under the name Ejendomsselskabet D.F.K. A/S. The company has since 1979 been the owner of Krabbesholm Manor at Roskilde.

== History ==
De Forenede kulimportører was established in 1907 through a merger of kulfirma Flindt, Drost & Co. (founded in 1881) and Wm. Callesen. The company operated two coal depots in Copenhagen, one in Gasværkshavnen at Langebro and one in Kalkbrænderihavnen in Østerbro with five electric cranes and t10 silos for coal, coke and cinders. The company was initially based in the Industry Building but relocated to new premises at Jolmens Kanal 5 in 1922. V. Steen-Christensen was managing director of the companying 1950.

=== D/S De Forenede Kulimportører ===
In 1924, D. F. K. established the shipping company D/S De Forenede Kulimportører A/S as in independent subsidiary. The fleet initially consisted of eight vessels (c. 24.000 tons d. w.). S/SVictoria sank after a collision in 1937 and S/S Scotia, S/S England and S/S Vendia were lost during the second World War. In 1950, it operated the vessels S/S Concordia (4,100 tons d. w.), S/S Dania (3,850 tons d. w.), S/S Cimbria (3.550 tons d. w.), S/S Hafnia (3,050 tons d. w.) and S/S Scandia (2,450 tons d. w.). In 1972 the company was converted into a limited company (aktieselskab) under the name A/S Dampskibsselskabet D.F.K.

== Today ==
The earlier activities of the company was discontinued in 1979 and it was then converted into a property company under the name. It is based in Hørsholm. It has since 1979 been the owner of Krabbesholm Manor at Roskilde.
