= List of churches in Lejre Municipality =

This list of churches in Lejre Municipality lists church buildings in Lejre Municipality, Denmark.

== List ==
Name	Location	Year	Coordinates	Image	Refs
Allerslev Church	Allerslev	[[]]			
Gershøj Church	Gershøj	[[]]			
Gevninge Church	Gevninge	1250	55°38′54″N 11°57′46.5″E		
Gershøj Church	Gershøj	[[]]			
Glim Church	Glim	13th century	55°36′26.5″N 12°1′36.2″E		
Herslev Church	Herslev	[[]]	55°50′10″N 11°58′45″E		
Kirke Hvalsø Church	Kirke Hvalsø	1			
Kirke Hyllinge Church	Kirke Hyllinge	[[]]			
Kirke Saaby Church	Kirke Saaby	[[]]			
Kisserup Church	Kisserup	[[]]			
Kornerup Church	Kornerup	[[]]			
Kornerup Church	Kornerup	[[]]	55°44′47″N 12°0′22.2″E		
Lyndby Church	Lyndby				
Osted Church	Osted	1			
Rorup Church	Rorup	[[]]			
Rye Church	Rye	[[]]			
Skibby Church	Skibby				
Sonnerup Church	Sonnerup	[[]]	55°39′3″N 11°49′33″E		
Sæby Church	Sæby	c. 1100	55°42′16.6″N 11°56′20.2″E		
Særløse Church	Særløse	[[]]	55°44′35.87″N 11°52′38.99″E		

== See also ==
- Listed buildings in Frederikssund Municipality
