= Treaty of Jönköping =

Peace Treaty between Denmark-Norway and Sweden

- Type: Peace treaty
- Context: End of the Dano-Swedish War (1808–1809)
- Drafted: Middle of November
- Signed: 10 December
- Location: Jönköping
- Ratified: 10 December
- Effective: 10 December
- Negotiators: Carl Gustaf Adlerberg; Niels Rosenkrantz
- Signatories: Carl Gustaf Adlerberg; Niels Rosenkrantz
- Parties: Sweden; Denmark-Norway

The Treaty of Jönköping was a peace agreement signed between Denmark–Norway and Sweden, which ended the Dano-Swedish War (1808–1809). It was mainly signed due to Swedish exhaustion after the loss of Finland to Russia in the Finnish War, and its leaders wanted to restore pre-war borders with Denmark–Norway. The treaty was concluded on 10 December 1809.

== Background ==
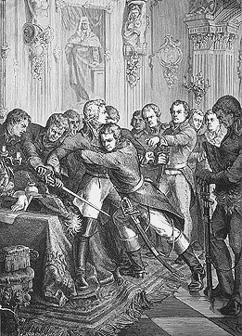
Etching from the 19th century depicting the arrest of Gustav IV during the 1809 coup d'état

After the coup d'état of Gustav IV on March 7, 1809, Swedish leadership no longer had any desire to continue the ongoing war with Denmark, as it had also recently lost Finland to Russia in the Treaty of Fredrikshamn.

Jönköping would be picked as the location for the negotiations, with the reason that the city was located at around the same distance from both Stockholm and Copenhagen. In late autumn, the two delegates, Carl Gustaf Adlerberg on the Swedish side, and Nils Rosenkrantz on the Danish side, began working through the demands and counter-demands on both sides.

In a short amount of time, the diplomats were quickly able to agree on several issues, and on 10 December, the treaty was signed.

== Stipulations ==
- Return to status quo between the two, with both sides returning occupied territory.
- Sweden is to keep British warships from its coast.
- Defectors and prisoners from both sides are to be returned.

== Aftermath ==
After the negotiations were over, a closing ball took place, which was very lavish, with one eyewitness account claiming it was:

one of the most splendid parties ever held in Jönköping. The grand apartment was richly illuminated, soldiers paraded on the stairs and outside, fanfares resounded from the regimental band, alternating with those graceful dances whose enchanting music we still admire today. Uniforms shone, decorations glittered, and at the supper, arranged by one of the court's master chefs, the silverware brought from Stockholm sparkled.
