= Poul Vendelbo Løvenørn =

Danish army officer, diplomat and politician

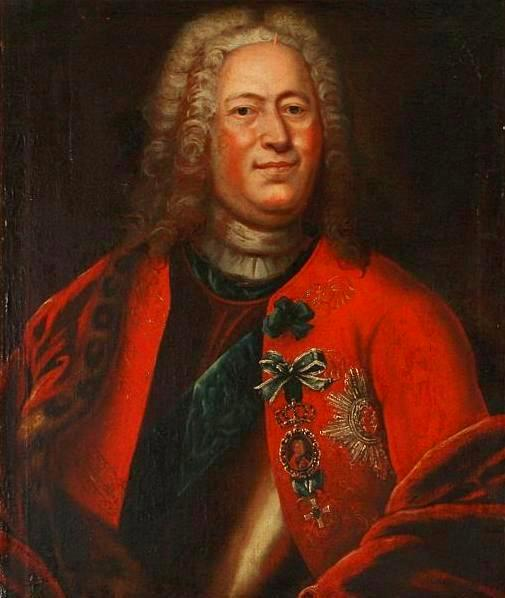

Secretary of War of the Navy
- In office 1730–1740
- Preceded by: Ditlev Revenfeld
- Succeeded by: Michael Numsen

Secretary of War of the Navy
- In office 1730–1735
- Preceded by: Ditlev Revenfeld
- Succeeded by: Frederik Danneskiold-Samsøe

Personal details
- Born: Poul Vendelbo; 5 April 1686 Horsens, Denmark
- Died: 27 February 1740 (aged 53) Copenhagen, Denmark
- Spouse: Dorthea Vinding (m. 1714)

Military service
- Allegiance: Denmark-Norway
- Branch/service: Royal Danish Army
- Years of service: (1711–1740)
- Rank: General (1738)
- Commands: Cavalry

Poul Thomsen Vendelbo de Løvenørn (born Poul Thomsen; 5 April 1686 – 27 February 1740) was a Danish army officer, diplomat and politician. He served as Secretary of War and Minister of the Navy in the 1730s and was the owner of Bregentved Manor. In 1711, Frederick IV raised him to the peerage under the surname Løvenørn. He was the father of naval officer Poul de Løvenørn.

== Early life and education ==
He was born at Horsens, the son of farmer Thomas Poulsen Vendelbo (or Windelboe) (died 1693) and wife Anne Nielsdatter (1645–1708). His father died in 1693 and the mother then married customs officer Stephan Jacobsen (1664–1728) in 1694. He studied theology.

== Career ==
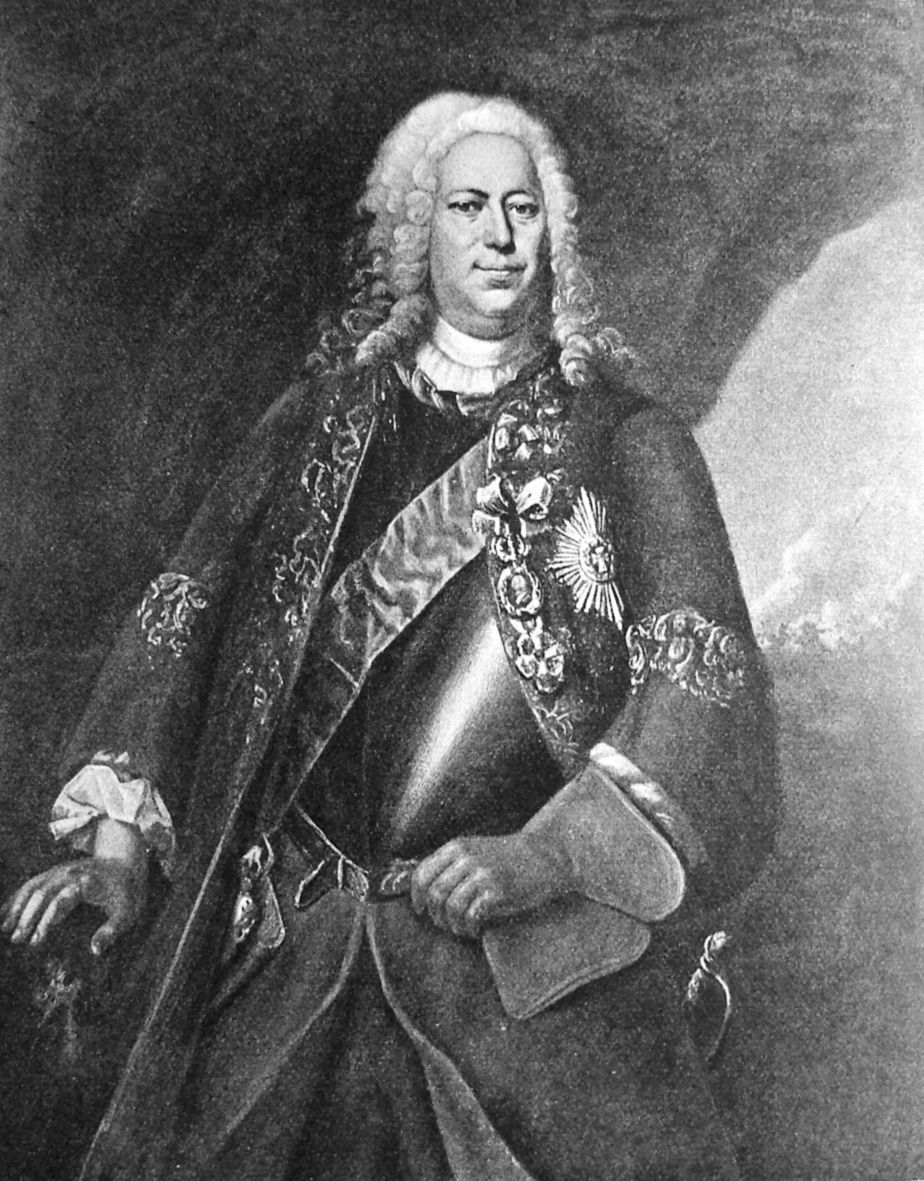
Poul Vendelbo Løvenørn painted by an unknown artist

He then travelled to Russia where he initially worked as a teacher and later became adjutant general at the court of Peter the Great.

King Frederick IV raised him to the peerage under the surname Løvenørn on his return to Denmark in 1711. He was promoted through the ranks as a military officer and on 16 April 1722, was created Knight of the Order of the Dannebrog. He later served as Danish envoy om Berlin. In 1726, he was appointed to district governor (amtmand) of Aarhus County.

Løbenørn was appointed to Secretary of War in 1730 and gehejmeråd in 1731. In 1733 he was appointed to general. He was a favorite of both King Frederick IV and King Christian VI. He was granted the Order of the Elephant in 1739.

== Personal life ==
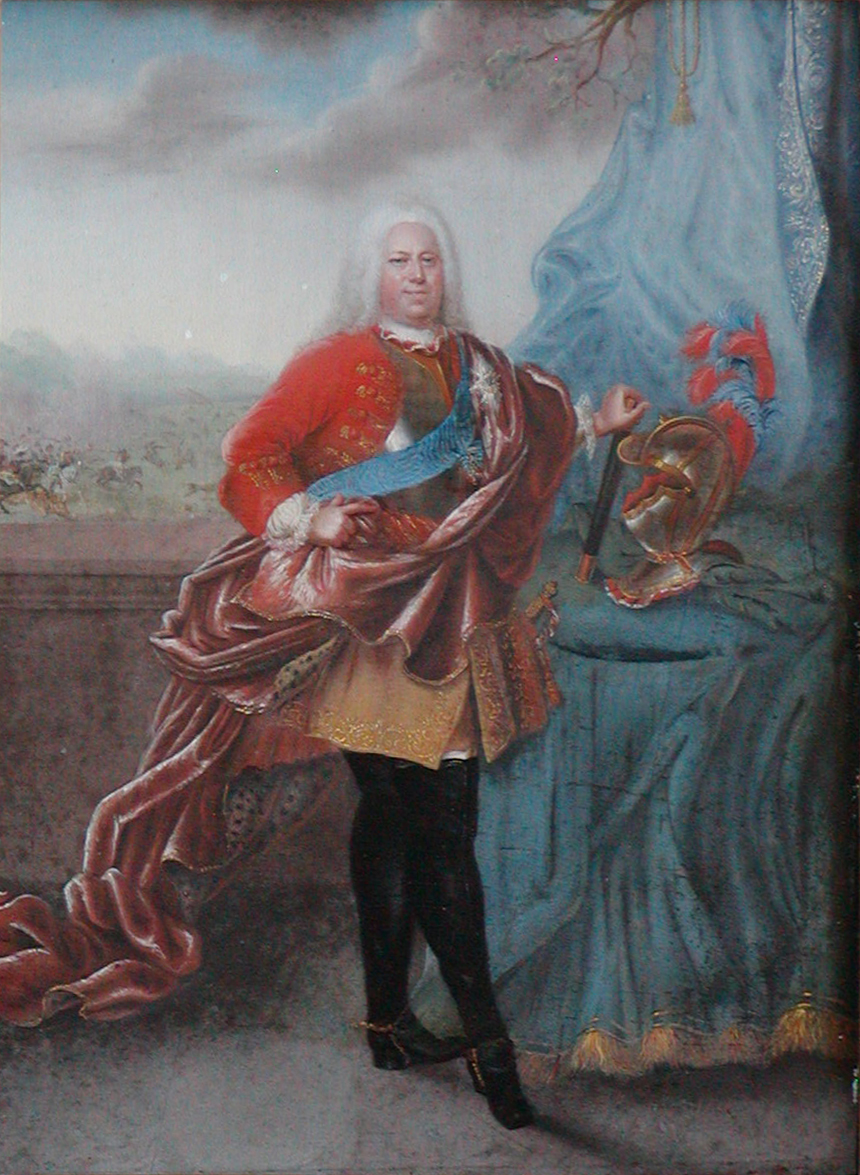
Poul Vendelbo Løvenørn painted in 1740 by Andreas Brünniche

Løvenørn married on 21 March 1714 in the Church of Our lady to Ingeborg Dorthea Vinding, (13 June 1686 – 28 January 1734), daughter of professor at the University of Copenhagen Poul Vinding (1658–1712) and Margrethe S. Bøgvad (1660–1721). His wife bore him a son, Frederik de Løvenørn (6 May 1715 – 15 October 1779) who became a military officer and district governor of Kronborg and Antvorskov.

Løvenørn purchased Bregentved Manor on very favorable conditions from the king in 1721. He died on 27 February 1740.

== Cultural references ==
Ambrosius Stub (1705–1758) wrote the poem Om Poul Vendelbo Løvenørn (1740) about Løvenørn on the occasion of his death.

Carl Ploug (1813–1894) wrote a six-page romantic poem about Løvenørn's early years and first encounter with his wife. The poem, entitled A Kiss, is included on the anthology Hovedværker i den danske Literatur (Copenhagen: Gyldendal, 1889).
