= Poul de Løvenørn =

Danish naval officer, cartographer, scientist and diplomat

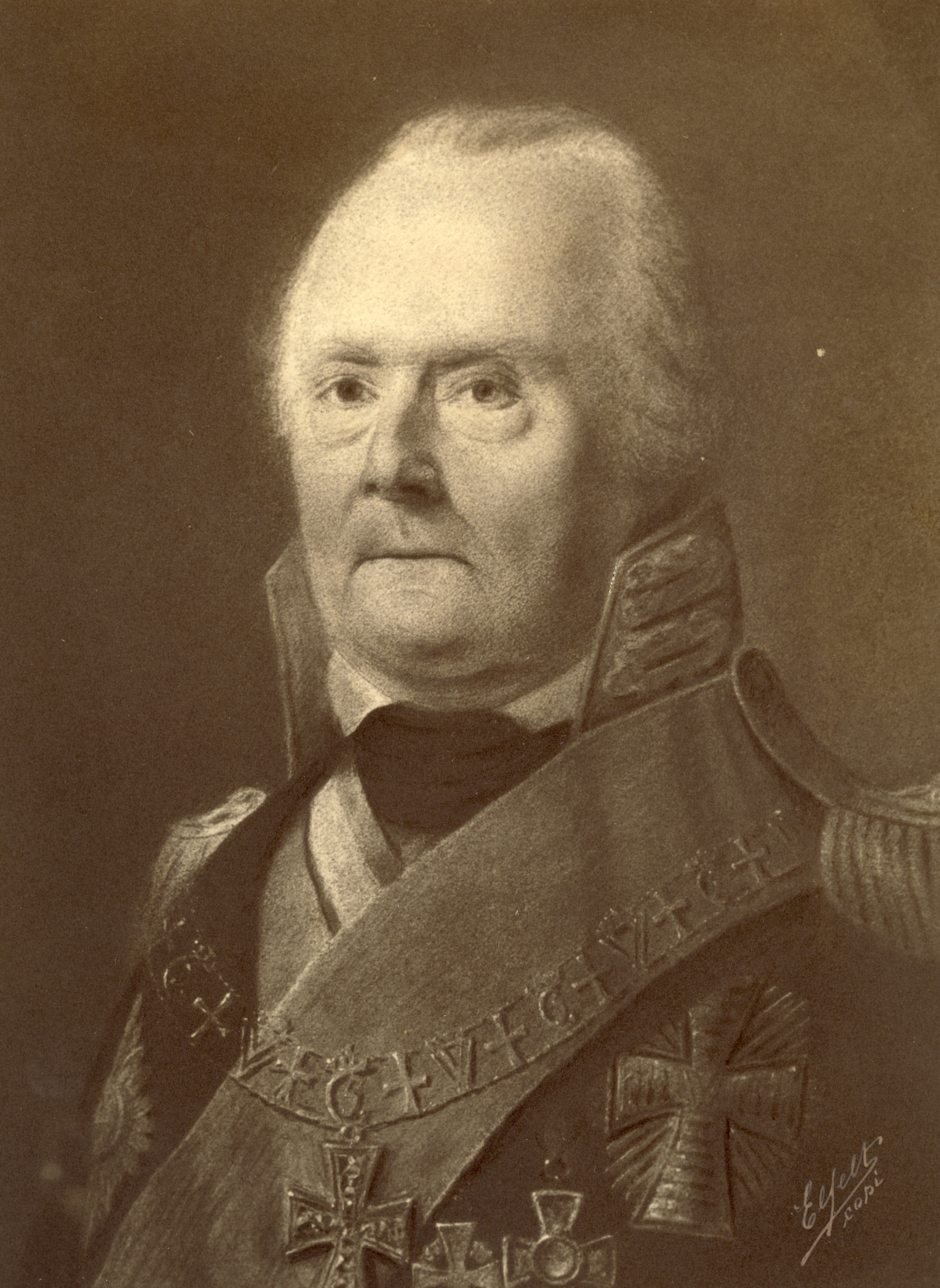
- Poul de Løvenørn (1751–1826)
- Born: 11 August 1751; Antvorskov Kloster near Slagelse, Denmark
- Died: 16 March 1826 (aged 74)
- Burial place: Assistens Kirkegård, Copenhagen
- Relatives: see Løvenørn (noble family)
- Military career
- Allegiance: Denmark–Norway (1762–1814); Denmark (1814–1826)
- Branch: (Denmark) Royal Dano-Norwegian Navy; (Denmark) Royal Danish Navy
- Service years: 1765–1826
- Rank: Counter-Admiral
- Awards: Grand Cross of the Order of the Dannebrog
- Other work: Cartography and diplomatic missions

Counter-Admiral Poul de Løvenørn (11 August 1751 – 16 March 1826) was a Danish naval officer, cartographer, scientist and diplomat.

== Personal life ==
Poul de Løvenørn was the grandson of Poul Vendelbo Løvenørn and the son of Frederik de Løvenørn. His mother was Frederikke née Holsten and there were ten siblings. His was one of the old noble families of Denmark. He was born 11 August 1751 in Antvorskov Kloster near Slagelse and died 16 March 1826 in Copenhagen. He married twice, first on 12 December 1792 to Anna Marie Philippine née Dumreicher (died 1795), secondly on 25 April 1797 to Caroline Henriette née Gæde (died 1842).

He second wife bore him two children: son Frederik Ernst Vendelbo de Løvenørn (1793–1849) and daughter Frederikke Sophie Elisabeth Løvenørn (1804–1889), who married Hans Schack Knuth, Count of Conradsborg (1787–1851), district governor of Præstø and Frederiksborg counties.

== Early career ==
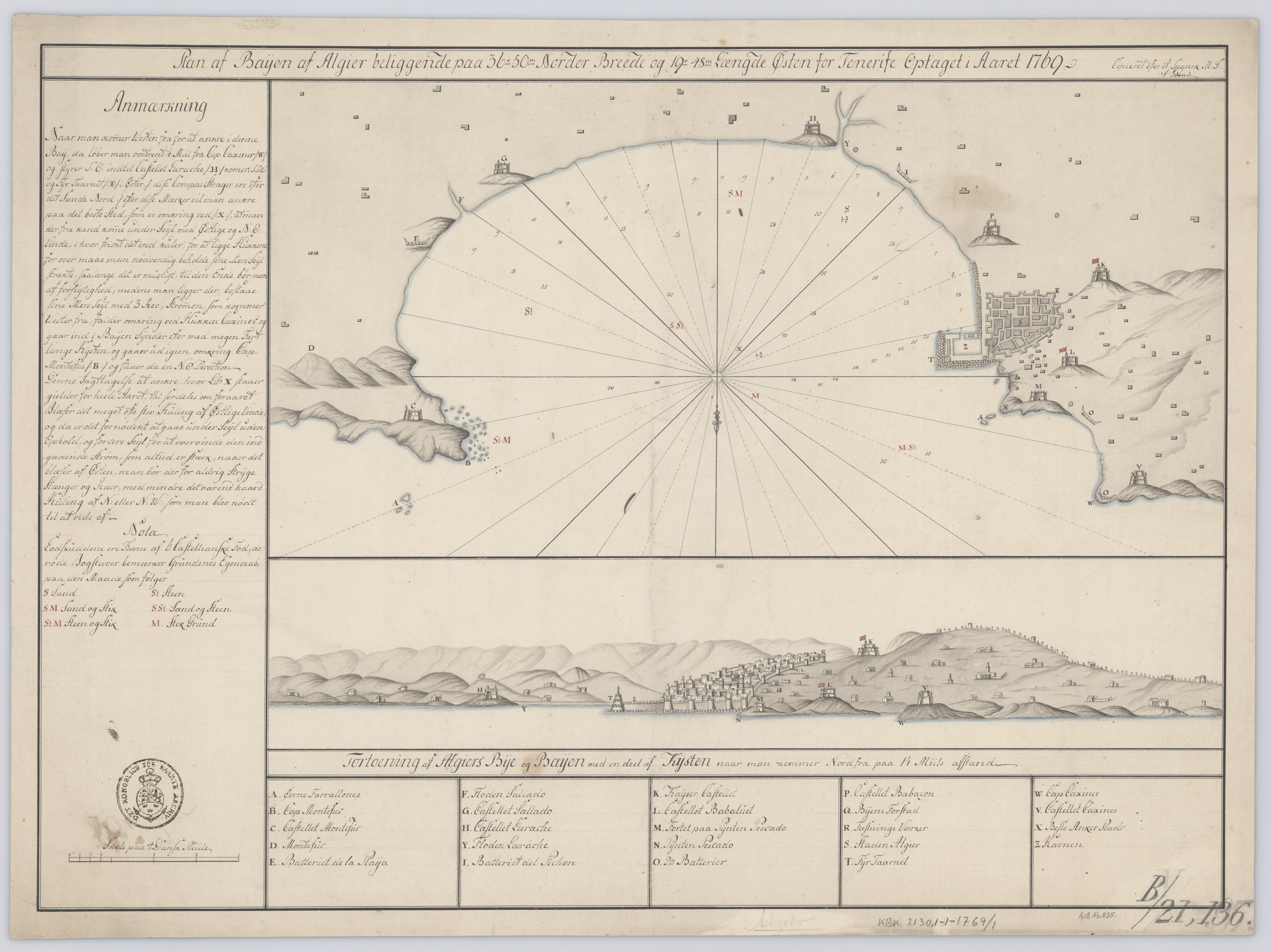
Nautical chart by Løvenørn of the waters off Baijin, Algier, 1769.

From 1760 as a volunteer cadet, Løvenørn enter the naval academy in 1765 (Note: The reference at Project Runeberg has Løvenørn becoming a cadet in 1767, but this appears to be an error as the usual ages for volunteer cadets to be enrolled into the academy were much younger) Løvenørn was particularly industrious and was commissioned junior lieutenant in 1770. Immediately after promotion, he was posted to a frigate with orders to sail to the Mediterranean. His first ship heading for the Mediterranean was totally dismasted in a North Sea storm, and had to return to Denmark for repairs. He later completed the voyage in another frigate, the Falster, and whilst in the Mediterranean also served on the ship-of-the-line Sejeren. After this for several years he was rarely at sea, studying at home and at work the sciences of astronomy and navigation.

1776 saw Løvenørn promoted to senior lieutenant, and two years later, together with nine other young Danish officers, he entered French naval service for the duration of the American War of Independence. Under the capable captain Verdun de la Crenne and in the fleet of Count d'Estaing he was both popular and noticed, quickly being appointed as adjutant to the fleet commander and promoted in the French fleet to lieutenant de vaisseaux. Here too, he eagerly engaged in navigation, studied where he could, made various French scientists friends, such as the mathematician Borda, and the astronomers Lalande (possibly Jérôme Lalande) and Méchain, and became a member of the Académie de Marine in Brest.

After a serious illness, the result of being shipwrecked in the Atlantic, Løvenørn was promoted in 1781 to lieutenant commander, and returned to Denmark in 1782 to lead an expedition charged with investigating some scientific and nautical problems and the use of the new nautical chronometer of J. A. Armand. Prior to the voyage Løvenørn studied at the observatory under the astronomer, mathematician and cartographer Thomas Bugge along with the few other Danish naval officers who would take part in the expedition. They departed the same year on the newly completed ship Prøven (best English translation: the Experiment), a vessel owned by The Royal Greenland Trading Department (Danish: Den Kongelige Grønlandske Handel, KGH), sailing via France, Portugal, The Azores and the Antilles – a voyage of one year’s duration. Løvenørn’s report was submitted to the Science Society of Denmark, resulting in his being admitted as a member in 1784. The report was published in 1786.

== Sea charts and expeditions ==
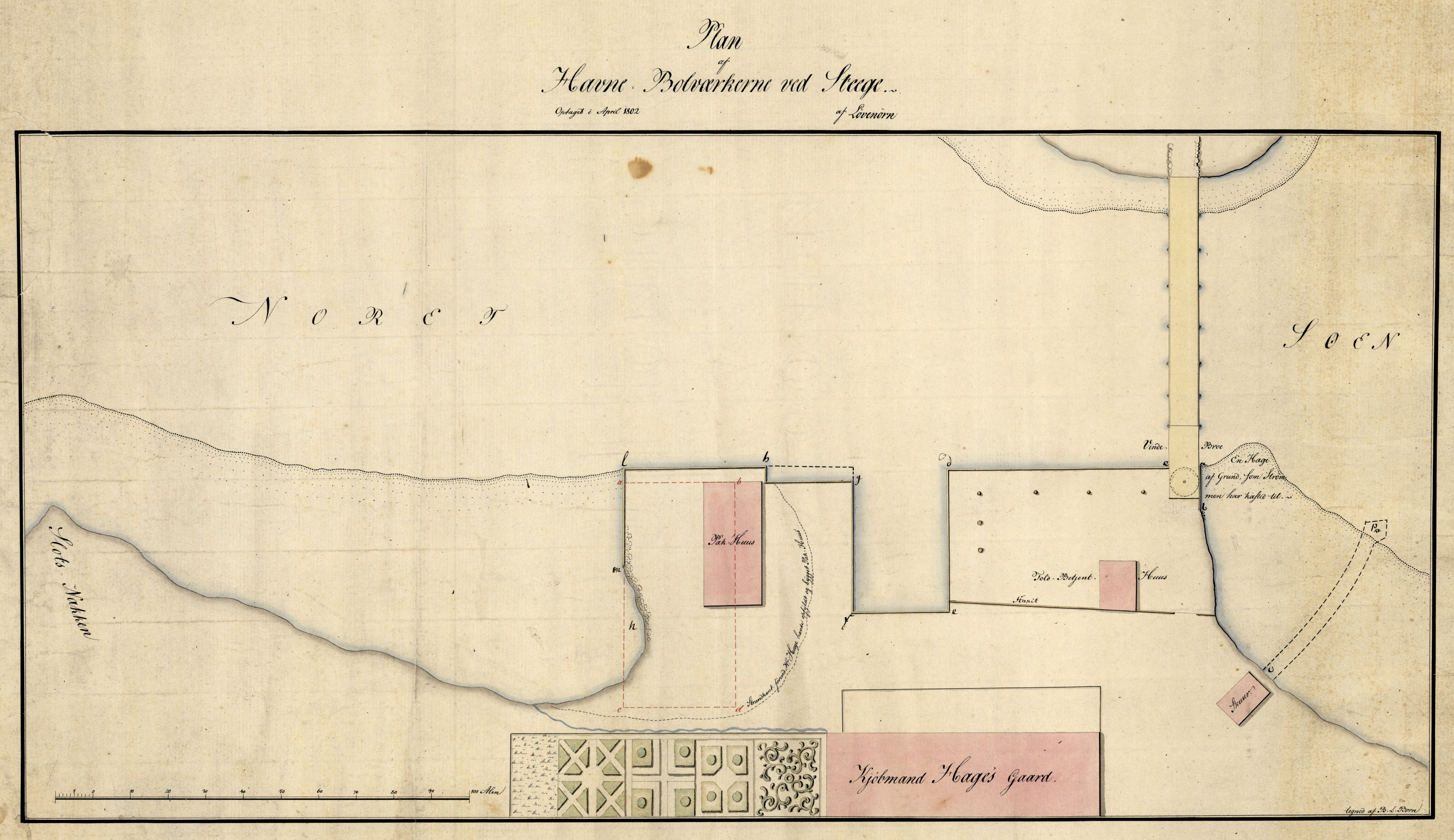
Plan by Løvenørn of Stege Harbour, Møn, 1802.

Throughout his career, Løvenørn concentrated professionally on cartography and navigation. The charts which Løvenørn produced, influenced or instigated, alongside written descriptions and pilots, cover areas as diverse as parts of Greenland and the Canary Isles, and also the English Channel and the Goodwin Sands. Mostly, however, they are charts of Danish-Norwegian coastal waters. Many of these are held in the M/S Maritime Museum of Denmark (Danish: M/S Museet for Søfart) at Helsingør.

In 1783 Løvenørn was named as adjutant-general in the naval service and at his initiative the archive of sea charts was established in 1784, based on the French Dépôt des cartes de marine (now named Naval Hydrographic and Oceanographic Service), with Løvenørn installed as its director. It is for his work and dedication here which supported the rational navigation of Danish waters that he is best known. Over several years he sailed round the entire coast of Denmark, measuring and sketching better pilotage instructions, improving harbours and lighthouses together with buoying the navigable channels. Prior to his work the relatively poor charts developed by the brothers Andreas Lous and Christian Carl Lous (Chief Pilot and Director of Navigation, respectively) in the 1760s had been the best available.

On one expedition in 1786 to Greenland with the intention of investigating the area near Østerbygden he was forced back by pack ice, so he transferred the expedition's command to lieutenant C. T. Egede and travelled home via Iceland and the Shetland Islands where he took the opportunity to study the coast and navigation so that later, with the help of others, he could work out the charts and pilotage of those regions. It may have been from this expedition that Cape Løvenørn 64°28′N 40°09′W was named. These charts proved of exceptional quality and were used for a great many years.

With similar exercises he so produced easier navigation of the Norwegian and Danish sea routes (Note: The fine detail of his work can be judged from these instructions (in Danish and in German) that Løvenørn produced in 1815 for the approaches to Sønderho, a minor harbour on the island of Fanø, near Esbjerg.) so he came into close contact with the General Customs collegiate which had responsibilities for harbours and lighthouses at that time. In December 1796 the leadership of the Pilot Service fell to Løvenørn which he reformed and improved, supervising and standardising pilots and recruiting officers round the whole of Denmark and Norway, and later in 1797 he was investigating the best options for ferry ports to link Femern and Lolland.

== Commands at sea ==
In a complex career, Løvenørn was often absent from his responsibilities in Copenhagen. His commands at sea included

- 1782–1783 – Prøven – scientific voyage to the West Indies.
- 1786 – Grev Ernst Schimmekmann – expedition ship to Greenland.
- 1788 – Lindormen – xebec, in Copenhagen's defence force.
- 1789 and 1794 – Kronborg or Cronborg – frigate, in the home squadron. Unrest in Bergen in 1794 was quelled by the arrival of Løvenørn's ship.
- 1790 – Hvide Ørn – frigate, guard ship at Copenhagen
- 1791–1792 – Gerner – frigate to Morocco.

== Administration and diplomacy ==
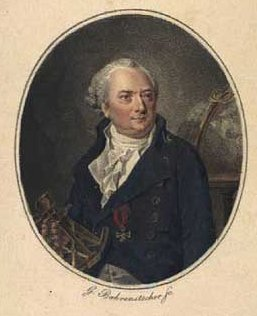
Poul de Løvenørn

As Løvenørn rose steadily through the ranks of the Royal Danish Navy to reach flag rank in 1812, and through the Danish honours system from Ridder af Dannebrog in 1809 to the Grand Cross in 1824, he exhibited great administrative abilities and was also employed on diplomatic missions to Sweden, Russia and Morocco.

In 1785 he led a scientific expedition to Sweden where he became friends with the admiral and scientist Fredrik Henrik af Chapman.

In 1787 Løvenørn was sent to Sweden and to Russia to secretly assess those countries military preparedness. He so impressed the tsarina Catherine the Great that she tried, unsuccessfully, to get him to come into her service. In 1788, after acting as an observer in gunnery trials on the ship-of-the-line Justitia, he was however attached to the Russian vice admiral von Dessen in 1788 (during the war with Sweden) when the latter was commanding a joint Russian-Danish squadron in Danish waters. (Lorentz Fisker was adjutant to the admiral at this time). It is recorded that Løvenørn was presented with an expensive gift from the Russian Court in appreciation of his help and knowledge of navigation in the Danish waters.

In 1789 he was promoted to captain and kept busy at sea for the next two years.

In 1791 the Danish government sent Løvenørn on yet another diplomatic mission, this time to Morocco with the annual tribute to the ruler there and instructions to negotiate a continuance of treaty terms. Everyone satisfied, he returned late in 1792 but was beset by storms and bad weather in the North Sea and had to overwinter in Norway.

In 1794, whilst captain of the frigate Cronborg, de Løvenørn was ordered to Bergen to prevent an uprising and was as such successful by the presence of his war ship.

Apart from these missions, Løvenørn was much used for his administrative talents where he could rapidly come to a practical solution. In this mode when yellow fever was ravaging the West indies and America in 1796 he established a quarantine station at Christiansand and also took reassuring quarantine measures both in Denmark and in Norway.

In May 1796 he was ordered to go to Farsund in southwest Norway to receive from the British four ships which had been seized in Norwegian harbours. These ships were the French privateer Le Petit Diable and two prizes captured by her, and the Dutch ship de Vlugheit, to be returned to their original crews. Løvenørn reported on 17 September from Farsund that the British sloop HMS Seagull had arrived with Le Petit Diable and de Vlugheit but not the two prizes of the French ship. Both the French and the Dutch protested at the poor condition of Le Petit Diable and de Vlugheit. When the captain of Seagull received orders from London to transfer the two ships as they were or to sail away leaving them at anchor, Løvenørn accepted them but put the case to a Notary Public for assessment, which the captain of Seagull refused to recognise.

Visiting the Eider region in 1799 he drew up plans for the better operating of the Eider Canal which had opened some fifteen years earlier, in 1784. In 1809 he was organising the Department of ferries in Denmark, and in the same year became a member of the Canal Directorate, which in 1811 became the department responsible for canals, harbours and lighthouses where he also served for a few years. In 1816 Løvenørn became a director of the General Customs Office and Commercial College. Throughout all these duties he maintained a lively correspondence with foreign scientific establishments of which he was a member, including the Institute de France.

== Final year ==
In the winter of 1825–26 Løvenørn’s health began to break down, so that he gave up on many of his duties and interests. He maintained an undiminished love of his work on the preparation of marine navigational charts and pilots and completed more than sixty charts and descriptions of conditions from northern Iceland to the most southerly of Danish waters. In this work, his legacy was a lasting memorial to his noble personality and competence.

Poul de Løvenørn died 16 March 1826 and is buried in Assistens Kirkegård in Copenhagen.

== Legacy ==
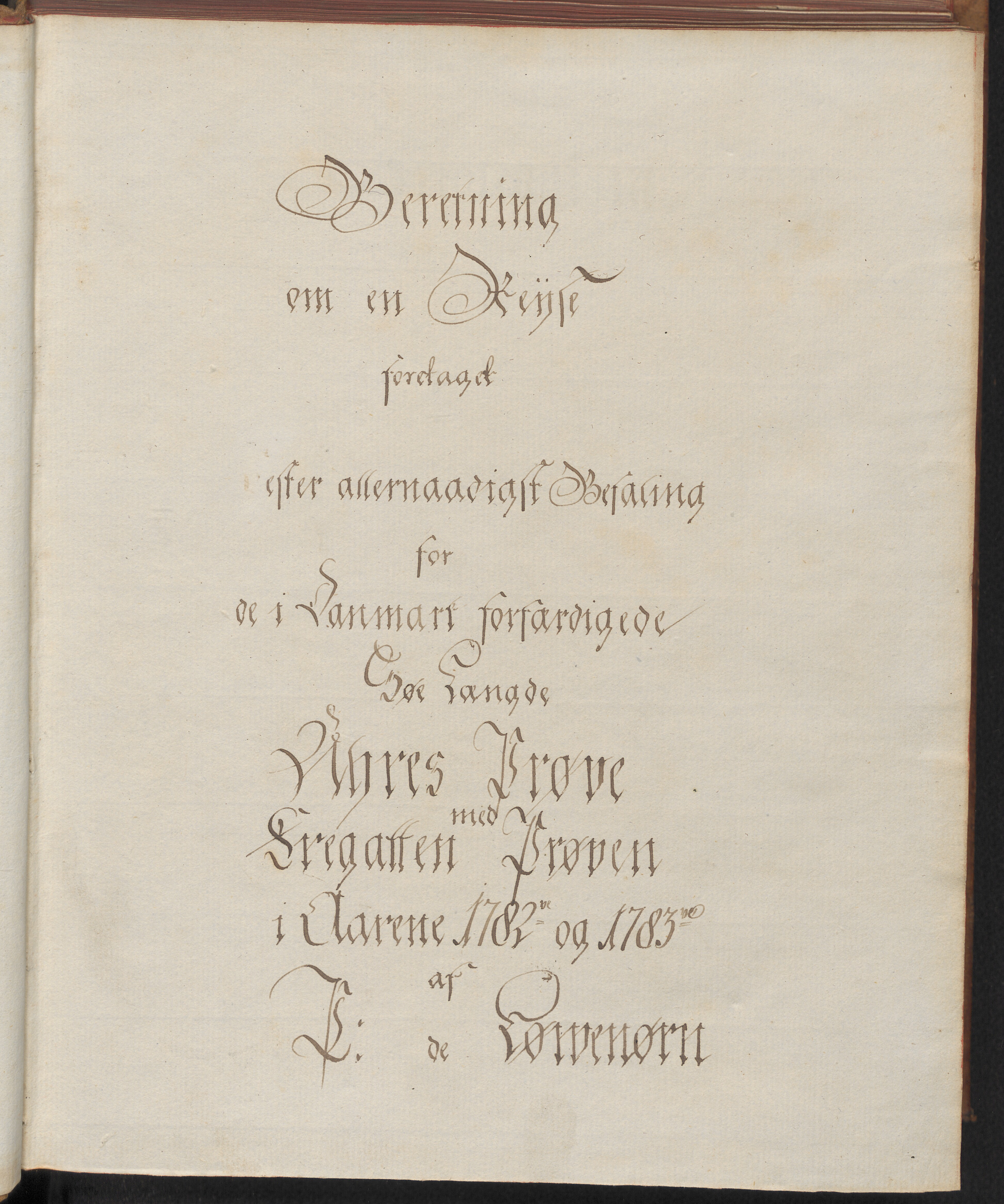
P. Lövenörns Beretning om en Reise for de i Danmark forfærdigede Söe-Længde-Uhres Pröve med Fregatten Pröven i Aarene 1782-83, Vol 1 (303 pages).

Løvenørn wrote a comprehensive account of his travels in Danish waters: P. Lövenörns Beretning om en Reise for de i Danmark forfærdigede Söe-Længde-Uhres Pröve med Fregatten Pröven i Aarene 1782-83.

He is credited with the construction of Christiansø Lighthouse (1801–05), Sprogø Lighthouse (1809, now replaced), Tunø Lighthouse (1811, later heightened) and Stevns Old Lighthouse (1816–18). Stevns Lighthouse was listed in the Danish registry of protected buildings and places in 1932.

A portrait (pastel) of Poul Løvenørn is in the private possession of the Count Holstein-Løvenørn, with a copy (by C A Jensen from 1834) in the museum at Frederiksborg. The same museum also holds a marble bust (by August Saabye) and another pastel by Christian Horneman. There is another bust at Copenhagen Observatory.

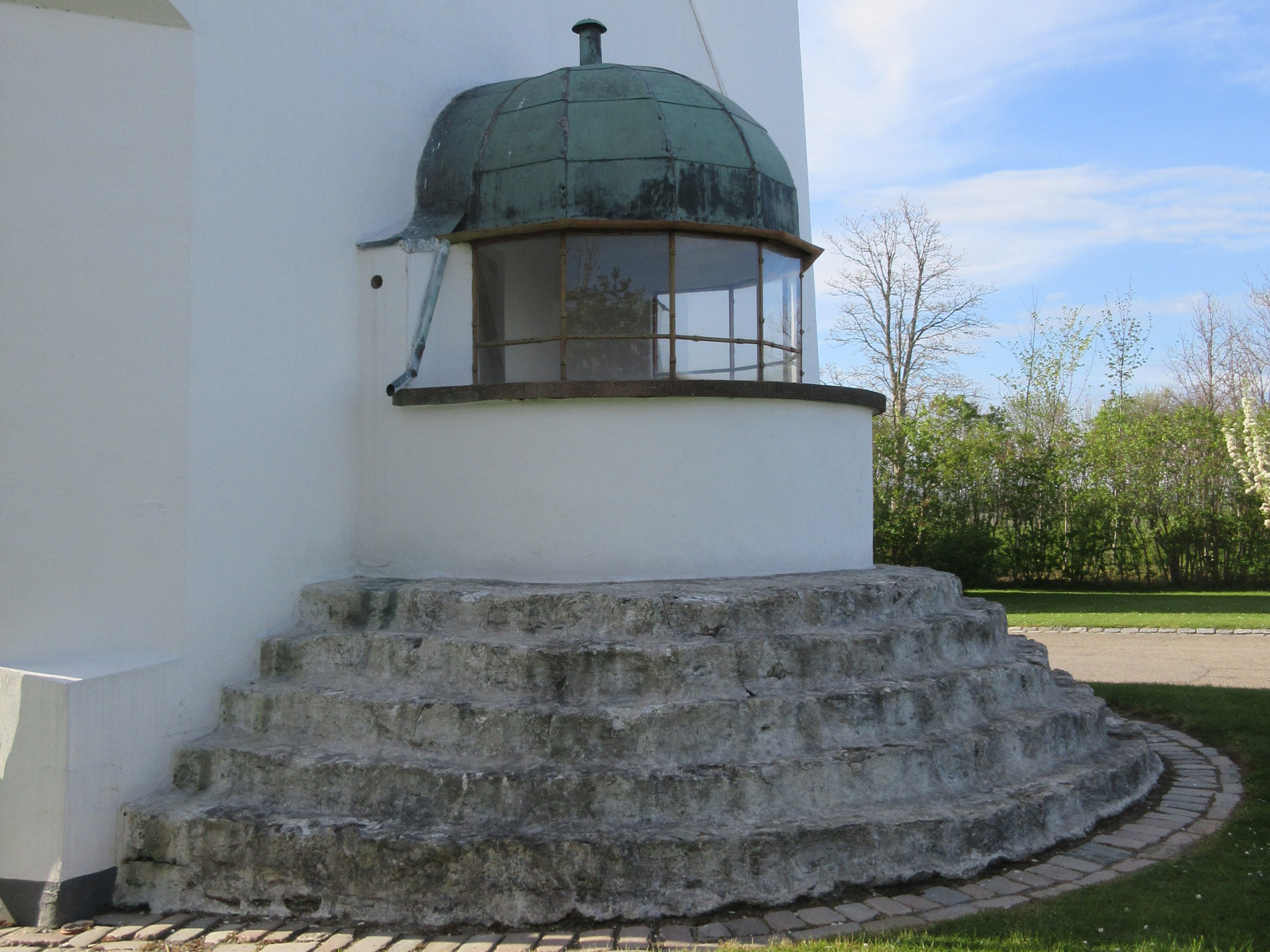
Stevns Old Lighthouse in 2021.

Three later ships of the Danish navy were named Løvenørn - in 1844, 1877, and 1910 but it is not clear to which member of the family Løvenørn the honour applies. Safe navigation of Danish waters is today promoted by the Danish Maritime Authority. The buoy tender Poul Løwenørn (note spelling), was launched in 2002 and continues his work today.

== Citations ==
- (in Danish) Initially translated from the Danish Wikipedia da:Poul de Løvenørn (søofficer), checked and augmented from the references quoted.
- (in Norwegian) Bergersen, Olav (1880-1973) (1966). Nøytralitet og krig: fra Nordens væpnede nøytralitets saga : en sjømilitær studie. Oslo: Tveitan. s. 239−240. (access online restricted to those with a Norwegian IP address)
- (in Danish) Bjerg, Hans Christian: Poul Løvenørn in Dansk Biografisk Leksikon at lex.dk (accessed 11 May 2021)
- Danish Maritime Authority (dma.dk)
- Gazetteer of Greenland (1983) on Google Books published by Defense Mapping Agency, Washington DC
- Geni.com website - Poul de Løvenørn
- Kringelbach, G. (1905). "Knuth, Joachim Sigismund Ditlev". In Brika, Carl Frederik (ed.). Dansk biografisk Lexikon. Vol. IX (1st ed.). Gyldendal. pp. 305–306 – via Project Runeberg.
- (in Danish) Marcussen website with more sources listed
- My Heritage website - Poul Løvenørn
- (in Danish) Project Runeberg - Poul Løvenørn in Dansk biografisk Lexikon Vol 10 pages 622–624
- (in Danish) Royal Danish Naval Museum - list of ships - Prøven
- (in Danish) Royal Danish Naval Museum - Skibregister
- (in Danish) T. A. Topsøe-Jensen og Emil Marquard (1935) Officerer i den dansk-norske Søetat 1660-1814 og den danske Søetat 1814-1932. Two volumes. No longer downloadable (April 2021) - previously available from here. Hard copies are listed in libraries Stockholm, Odense, Ballerup and Copenhagen
