= Niels Rosenkrantz =

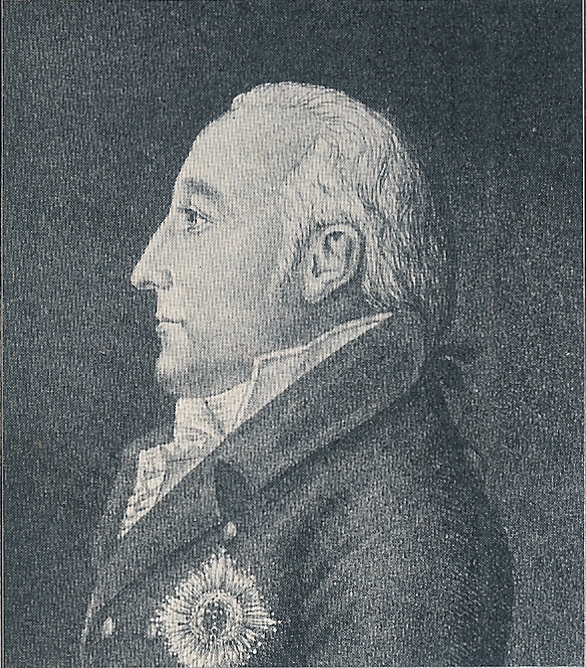

Niels Rosenkrantz (9 September 1757 in Øyestad, Norway - 6 January 1824 in Copenhagen) was a Danish-Norwegian statesman, diplomat and prime minister. He was the son of Otto Christian Rosenkrantz and Karen Johanne Rønning. He was an older brother of Marcus Gjøe Rosenkrantz.

After a short time of service in the military, Niels Rosenkrantz began to serve as a diplomat. In 1783, he was appointed as the Danish minister in The Hague. In 1784, he was assigned as the Danish minister in St. Petersburg. He became the Danish minister in residence of Warsaw in 1787. He served as the Danish Chamberlain and charge d'affaires at the Russian court in 1789. In 1795, he served as the Danish ambassador to the Prussian court in Berlin. In 1800, he was appointed as an ambassador to the Russian court. That same year, he became a knight of the Order of Dannebrog. In 1801, he was ordered by Czar Paul I to immediately leave Russia. He was re-invited to be the ambassador to the Russian court 1802-04 following Paul I's assassination and the ascension of his successor, Alexander I of Russia. In 1808, he served as a messenger between Denmark-Norway and Emperor Napoleon. He became a peace agent to Sweden in 1809, negotiating and signing the Treaty of Jönköping, which ended the Dano-Swedish War of 1808–1809. In 1810, he began to work with the messengers to Bonaparte again. That same year he was appointed as the head Foreign Minister. In 1811, he became a Knight of the Order of the Elephant.

Niels Rosenkrantz was born into an impoverished branch of a distinguished Danish noble family. However, he became a fairly prosperous landowner when his distant relative Prime Minister Frederik Christian Rosenkrantz designated him as his sole heir. He then came into the estates at Ryegaard, Egholm, Krabbesholm and Trudsholm in North Zealand, and Barritskov in Jutland. In 1791, he married Princess Varvara Alexandrovna Vyazemskaya (1774–1849), the youngest daughter of Prince Alexander Vyzemsky, Catherine II's Attorney General. He is buried in Rye churchyard near his manor Ryegård west of Roskilde.
