= Frederik Christian Rosenkrantz =

Danish noble

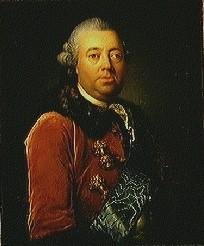
Frederik Christian Rosenkrantz

Frederik Christian Rosenkrantz (19 January 1724 - 15 May 1802) was a Danish noble, statesman and a wealthy landowner.

== Background ==
Frederik Christian Rosenkrantz was born in Copenhagen, Denmark. He was the son of Privy Iver Rosenkrantz (1674–1745) and Charlotte Amalie Skeel (1700–63). Frederik Christian Rosenkrantz became a varlet de chambre (kammerjunker) in 1741 and a chamberlain in 1748. In 1749, he was appointed as a Judge of the Supreme Court of Denmark, a position he held until 1771. Likewise, he was released from the court in 1749 when he was appointed into envoyé extraordinaire for the Prussian court and in 1751 by the English court. In 1760 he was appointed as a Knight of the Dannebrog.

== Early career ==
In 1763, Rosenkrantz's career received a tremendous boost; the king appointed him to the war secretary of the navy, as well as the first Director in the newly created road building system (vejbygningsvæsen). He also admitted into the Ordre de l'Union Parfaite. In 1764, he received the title of Privy Councillor and in 1765 began working for the General Trading Company (Det almindelige Handelskompagni). In January 1766, he became the war secretary of State Government service. But Rosenkrantz's predecessor as head of the fleet, Count Frederik Danneskiold-Samsøe (1703–1778) complained to Christian VII that the fleet was not being run properly. The king responded by dismissing Rosenkrantz from all his important government positions. In 1767, he was appointed to the privy council (konseillet) and a member of the government's inner circle. Finally, he became part of the Order of the Elephant in 1769. Frederik Christian Rosenkrantz retired when he was 46 years old, but was associated with people who would attempt to overthrow the Struensee government, the result was that he was relieved of his ministerial pension. It was disastrous for him as he had accumulated a huge debt of 140,000 dollars.

== Prime minister ==
For the next 13 years Frederik Christian Rosenkrantz lived privately on his estates. He occasionally worked at the court but had no official office. In 1784, Crown Prince Frederik conducted his coup and deposed Hoegh-Guldberg government. The circle around the crown prince chose to take some experienced men in the government, including Frederick Christian Rosenkrantz. He was re-appointed as prime minister and president of the Admiralty and Commissioner to Council (kommissariatskollegiet). He was considered an experienced administrator and could bring the government a continuity to the time before Johann Friedrich Struensee (1737–1772). He remained in this office until June 1788.

== Family life ==
On 11 October 1748 he was married to Dorte Reedtz (1730–1801) in the Church of Our Lady (Vor Frue Kirke). She was the daughter of Chamberlain Tonne Reedtz of Barritskov Manor (1700–1743). They had 3 sons who were born between 1749 and 1762. While the last two died shortly after birth, the oldest Iver Rosenkrantz-Levetzau (1749–1787) lived until age 38.

== Legacy ==
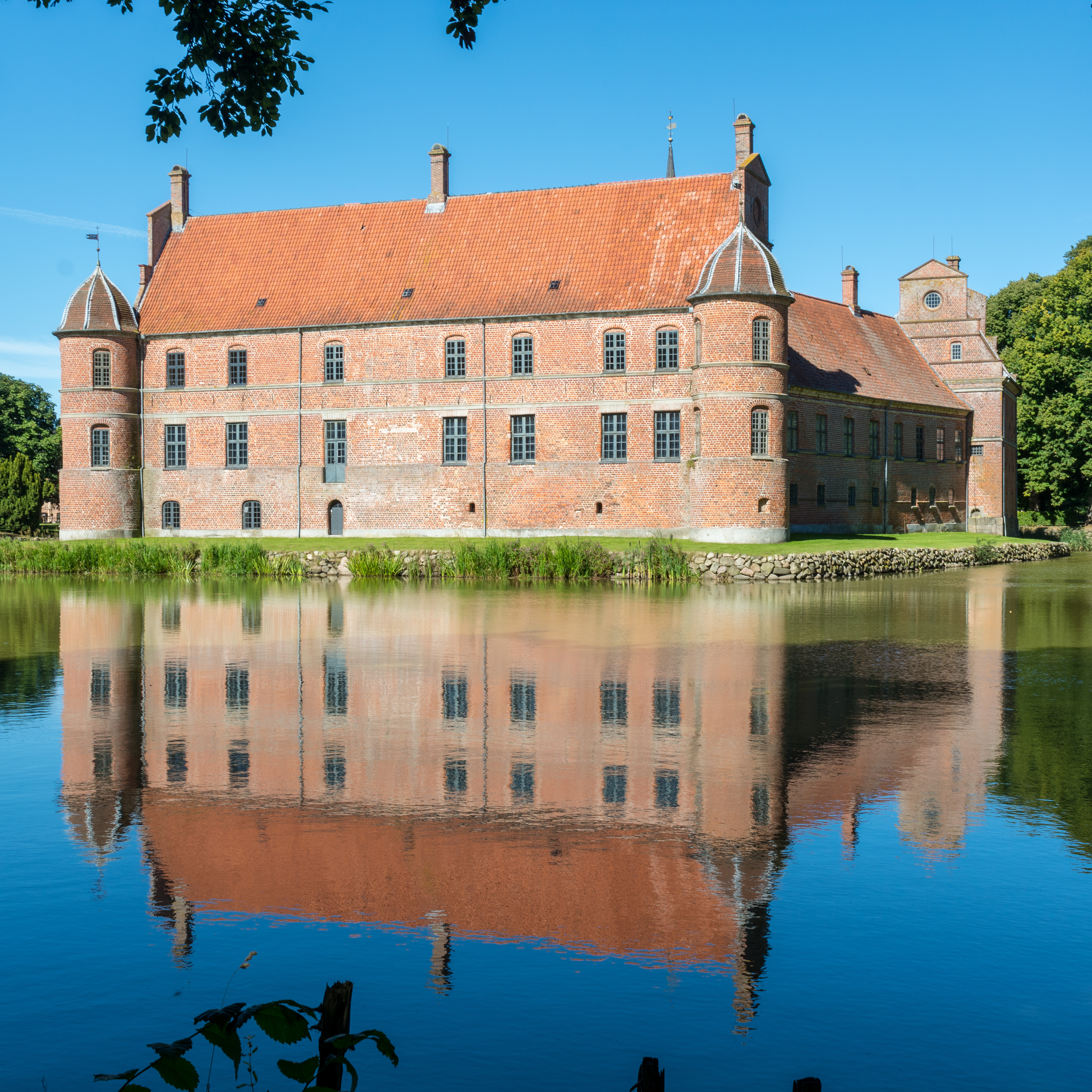
Rosenholm Castle

Frederik Christian Rosenkrantz was the Rosenkrantz family's most prominent man since the 1600s. From his parents he inherited the Stamford House, Rosenholm Castle in Jutland and the North Zealand manor houses Egholm, Ryegaard and Krabbesholm. In addition, he bought Trudsholm and his wife inherited Barritskov in Jutland.

== See also ==
- Rosenkrantz (noble family)
