= Iver Rosenkrantz =

Danish statesman

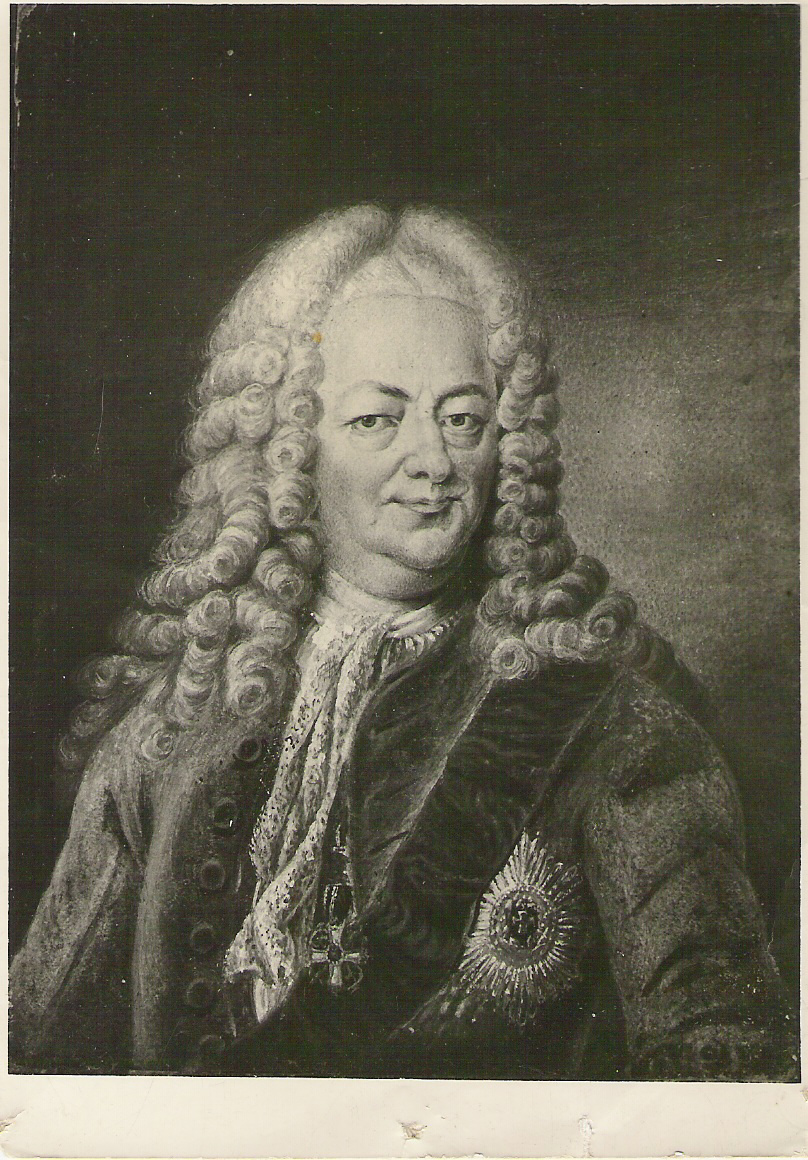

Privy Councillor of Denmark
- Predecessor: Ulrik Adolf Holstein
- Successor: Johan Ludvig Holstein-Ledreborg
- Born: 5 December 1674; Rosenholm Castle, Hornslet, Denmark
- Died: 13 November 1745 (aged 70); Rosenholm Castle, Hornslet, Denmark
- Issue: Frederik Christian Rosenkrantz

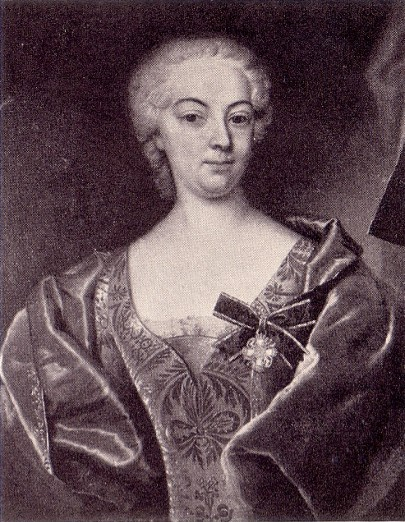
Charlotte Amalie Skeel (1700–63)

Iver Eriksen Rosenkrantz (5 December 1674 – 13 November 1745) was a Danish statesman and landowner.

== Early lige and education ==
Iver Rosenkrantz was born at Rosenholm Castle (Rosenholm Slot) in Hornslet, Denmark. He was the son of Erik Rosenkrantz til Rosenholm (1612–1681) and his third wife Margaret Krabbe til Vemmetofte (1640–1716). His father was a nobleman and statesman who died when Iver was aged 7. Iver's mother hailed from the province of Scania (Skåne) which was ceded to the Swedes in 1658. Iver's maternal grandfather Iver Krabbe was a prominent politician and army man, one-time governor of Norway. Iver Krabbe and his wife (young Iver's grandmother), Karen Marsvin, settled in Denmark after the cession of Scania, but young Iver still had two aunts and an uncle in what was now southern Sweden. Iver's uncle, Baron Jørgen Krabbe of Krogholm (now Krageholm), was very fond of him. Unfortunately, Jørgen Krabbe was executed by the Swedes in 1678, in the midst of the Scanian War.

Iver received a rigorous education. In 1691 he came to Copenhagen to attend the Knight Academy (Ridderakademi). Three years later he took a trip abroad returning in 1697. In January 1698, he was appointed chamberlain (Kammerjunker) to Princess Sophia Hedwig (1677–1735).

== Career ==
In 1700, King Frederick IV of Denmark sent Rosenkrantz on a diplomatic mission to meet with King Charles XII of Sweden, though he returned unsuccessful. In 1702 he was appointed a Counsellor and then also served as Danish ambassador to England 1702–1706 and 1710–1714. In 1709– , he served as governor of Copenhagen County, but no doubt left the daily operations to a deputy governor (viceamtmand), especially during his second term as ambassador in London. On his second return from London, he was appointed Secretary of the Board of Trade. With Frederick IV relying increasingly on his Queen Anne Sophie Reventlow, and with Rozenkrantz critical of the Danish aristocracy, he was stripped of his titles and appointed governor of Viborg, thereby removing him from central government, although he remained on good terms with the King's siblings.

== Minister of State ==
When Frederick IV died in 1730, the new King Christian VI immediately called Rosenkrantz back to Copenhagen, where he was appointed a Knight of the Elephant and appointed lord secretary (oversekretær) of the two Danish Chancellories. During the hostility between England and France, he backed England. He was also known for his patronage of Copenhagen University. He was dismissed in 1735 following a disagreement with the king regarding foreign policy.

== Personal life ==
He was elected a Fellow of the Royal Society in June 1713.

He married twice: in 1702 with Birgitte Gersdorff (1677–1719), daughter of Frederik Gersdorff til Aakær, Mord Master of Ceremonies, of Ravnholt and Tølløse. In 1721 with Charlotte Amalie Skeel (1700–63), daughter of Christen Skeel, Prefect of Vallø. Charlotte Amalie Skeel and Rosenkrantz were the parents of six children including Frederik Christian Rosenkrantz (1724–1802). Iver Rosenkrantz died on the year 1745 at Rosenholm Castle. He was buried at Hornslet Church (Hornslet kirke).

== See also ==
- Rosenkrantz (noble family)

Political offices
Preceded by Ulrik Adolf Holstein	Privy Councillor of Denmark; 1730 -1735	Succeeded by Johan Ludvig Holstein-Ledreborg
