= Frederik Danneskiold-Samsøe =

Danish politician

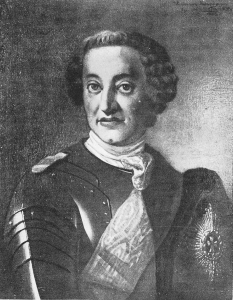
- Frederik Danneskiold-Samsøe
- Born: 1 November 1703; Assendrup, Denmark
- Died: 18 July 1770 (aged 66); Aarhus, Denmark

Frederik Danneskjold-Samsøe (1 November 1703 – 18 July 1770) was a Danish politician, minister, admiral, chief of the Danish-Norwegian marine and count of the Barony Marselisborg. In his time Danneskjold-Samsøe held numerous public offices and was awarded the Order of the Dannebrog, Order of the Elephant and the Ordre de l'Union Parfaite and was made Chamberlain. In 1767 he was ousted from his positions and spent the rest of his life focused on philanthropy and socializing, in part with Christian Jacobsen Drakenberg.

== Early life and education ==
Frederik Danneskjold-Samsøe was born at Assendrup Manor in 1703, the son of Christian Gyldenløve and Dorothea Krag. At nine years old, he and his brother Christian Danneskiold-Samsøe were sent to England where he stayed until he was 16. He became interested in all things related to ships, from regulations, to building them, to their inner mechanical workings. After he left England he spent some time in Paris before he moved to Holland to pursue maritime studies.

== Career ==
In 1721 Danneskjold-Samsøe returned to Denmark and sought a career in the Danish navy, hoping for help from his uncle king Frederik IV. However, no commands in the navy appeared and instead he commanded companies in the cavalry and infantry. On 31 July 1724 he married Dorothea Wedell-Wedellsborg at the age of 21 and had 3 sons and six daughters, although only one son and two daughters lived to adulthood.

In 1729 he was appointed to the Geheimrat. When Christian VI became king Danneskjold-Samsøe again sought employment in the navy but this time he was hired as an assessor for the Danish Supreme Court and the Royal Court. In 1731 he was finally hired in the administration of the navy where he proved an effective administrator. However, he had a vocal and abrasive temperament which created conflict with general Poul Vendelbo Løvenørn who controlled both the Danish navy and army at the time. In 1735 Christian VI took Danneskjold-Samsøe's side and split command of the navy and army up, and placed the navy under Danneskjold-Samsøe's command, now as Secretary of the Navy. The following year he was made Intendant, a title he kept through Christian VI's governance. In 1739 he was appointed to the Geheimrat, in 1739 he was given the Ordre de l'Union Parfaite and in 1743 he was made Lieutenant admiral.

Danneskjold-Samsøe had a strong personality and made enemies. When Christian VI died in 1746 Danneskjold-Samsøe was quickly removed from his position in the navy. He lived some years in retirement, first on Søllerødgård Manor, later at Marselisborg Manor at Aarhus. In 1760 the king called him back into service, first at Sorø Akademi in 1760 and later as the royal representative in Sorø and Ringsted Counties. He worked at the Academy for 4 years until he was finally fired for incessant complaining over the budget.

Frederik Danneskjold-Samsøe died on 18 July 1770 on Marselisborg Manor and is buried in the Church of Our Lady in Aarhus.

== Legacy ==
The street Danneskiold-Samsøes Allé on Holmen in Copenhagen is named for him. In Jægerspris Slot a memorial stone carved by Johannes Wiedewelt was erected in 1778. In Gisselfeld there is a pastel by Carl Gustaf Pilo from 1745 and several portraits by Johan Friedrich Arends 1770 and 1771. In addition paintings at Sorø Akademi (likely by Peder Als).
