= Nicolai Abraham Holten =

Danish civil servant (1775–1850)

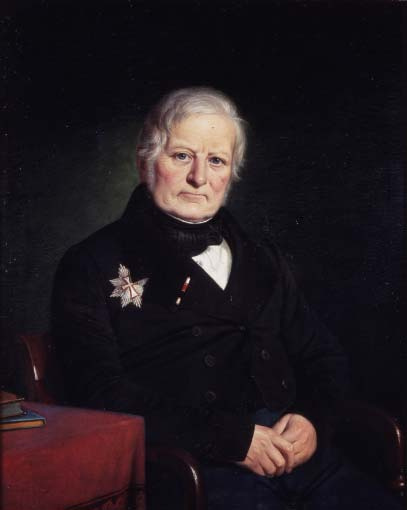
- Born: 27 March 1775; Copenhagen, Denmark
- Died: 12 May 1850 (aged 75); Helsingør, Denmark
- Occupations: Bankier and civil servant

Nicolai Abraham Holten (27 March 1775 – 12 May 1850) was a Danish civil servant in the financial administration and director of Øresund Custom House.

== Early life and education ==
Holten was born in Copenhagen, the son of customs officer and former pharmacist Johannes (Hans) Holten (1741–1816) and Ane Margrethe Holten née Abildgaard (1747–1826). His grand father was royal furniture maker Johann von Holten and he was named after his maternal uncle Nicolai Abraham Abildgaard.

He attended Efterslægtselskabets Skole from October 1788 to September 1790. He was later educated in Niels Ryberg's trading house.

== Career ==
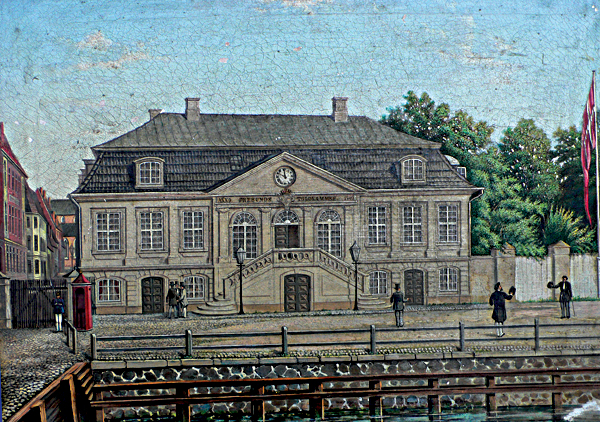
Øresund Custom House

After completing his education Holten established his own business as a bankier and broker. He collaborated with the government and was in 1816 appointed to specialist director of national debt (statsgældsdirektør). He headed to the office for foreign payments in 1817–1839 and was a member of a commission that made a proposal for the important Negotiable Instrument Act (veksellov) of 1825. He was also consulted as a personal advisor on financial matters by Frederick VII.

Holten was appointed director of Øresund Customs House in Helsingør in 1830 but continued as a member of the governing board of the national debt department until 1848.

He was appointed to council of state (etatsråd) in 1817, Konferensråd in 1829 and Gehejmekonferensråd (privy councillor) in 1847.

== Landowner ==
He purchased Lindegården on the Hornsherred peninsula in 1909 and the nearby manor of Krabbesholm in 1910. He used Lindegården as a summer residence and was responsible for many improvements of the management of his land. He was interested in trees and established a nursery on his estate. He was known for treating the farmers on his estate well and he founded the school in Skibby.

== Personal life ==
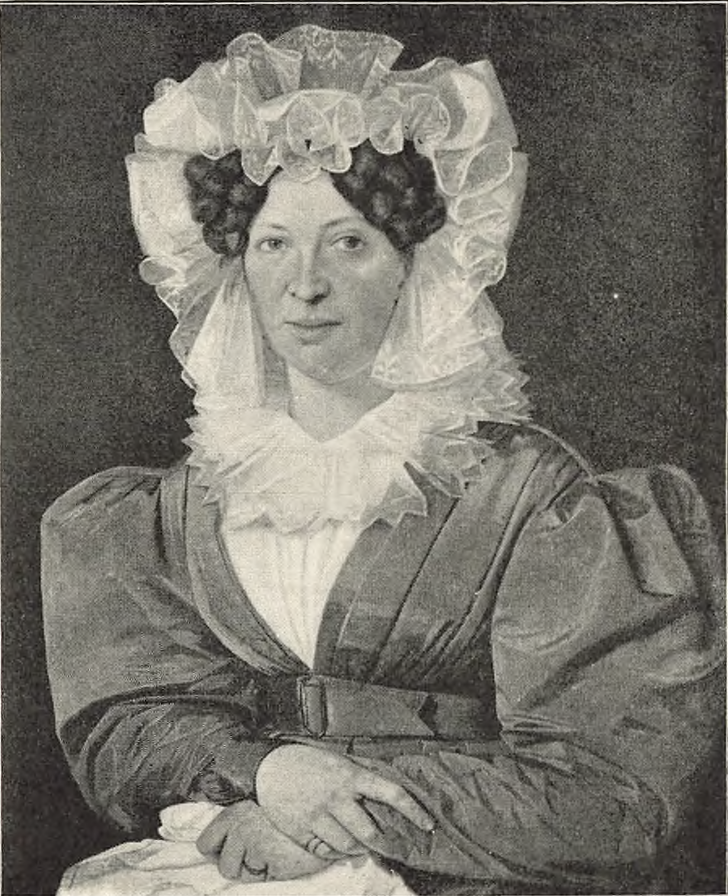
Johanne (Hanne) Cathrine Kirstine Holten, née Mangor.

Holten married Johanne (Hanne) Cathrine Kirstine Mangor (2 May 1778 – 20 November 1869) in the Church of the Holy Ghost in Copenhagen on 15 May 1799. She was a daughter of country doctor in Næstved and later city doctor (stadsfysikus) in Copenhagen C. E. Mangor (1739–1801) and Marie Elisabeth Mangor née Klagenberg (1743–1823).

Nicolai and Cathrine Holten had four children, one son and three daughters. Hans Christian Holten became a vicar of the parishes of Skuldelev and Selsø. Sophie Holten married the folklorist Just Mathias Thiele. The two other daughters did not survive childhood. Sophie Holten's daughters Ida and Anna grew up in their grandparent's home from the time they were five and three years old after their mother's death in 1835.

Holten owned the Gustmeyer House in Copenhagen. He sold it when he was appointed director of Øresund Customs House in 1839.

He died on 12 May 1850. He was buried from St. Olaf's Church and interred at Assistens Cemetery.
