= Niels Larsen (disambiguation) =

Niels Larsen (1889–1969) was a Danish sport shooter.

Niels Larsen may also refer to:

- Niels Bjørn Larsen (1913–2003), Danish ballet dancer and choreographer
- Niels P. Larsen, Danish-American politician
- Nils Larsen (pianist) (1888–1937), Norwegian pianist and composer

== See also ==
- Niels Larsen Bruun (1893–1970), Norwegian admiral
- Niels A. Lassen (1926–1997), Danish physician and neurologist
- Niels Lassen (farmer) (c. 1729–1811), Danish farmer
- Niels Larsen Stevns (1864–1941), Danish painter and sculptor
