= Maglegård =

Former building in Gentofte, Denmark

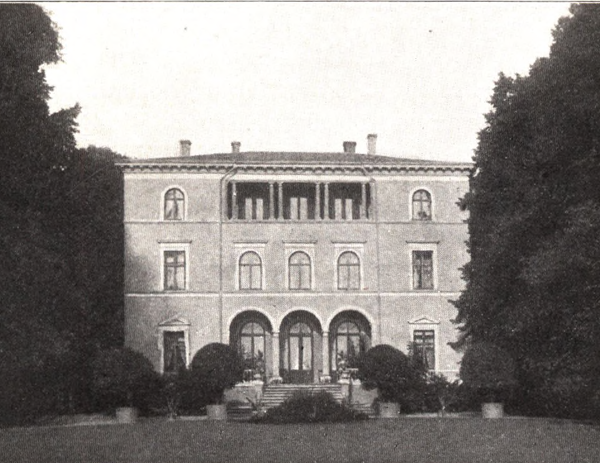
Maglegaard in the early 1900s.

Maglegård was a country house and local landmark on Strandvej in Hellerup, Gentofte Municipality, Copenhagen, Denmark. A new main building designed by Ferdinand Meldahl was constructed on the site of the old building in 1860. It was demolished in the 1930s in conjunction with the construction of the Blidah Park housing estate. Today the name subsists in the names Maglegård's Parish, Maglegårdsvej (Maglegård Road) and Maglegård School.

== History ==
=== Origins ===
Maglegård was one of the new farms which were created when the Great Agrarian Reforms were implemented at Bernstorff Palace in the 1760s. It was named after Maglemosen, a large bog situated on the site (Magle– = "Great" in Old Danish; –mosen = "bog": –gård = "farm"). With an area of 105.5 tønder, Maglegård was the largest of the new farms. The size of the estate was meant to compensate for the fact that a substantial part of the land was not suitable for cultivation, being either meadows or bogland. Its first owner was the farmer Morten Olsen. The estate was bordered by Charlottenlund and Bregnegaard to the north and northwest Oregaard to the south, Tranegaard to the west and the coast to the east.

=== Brown family ===
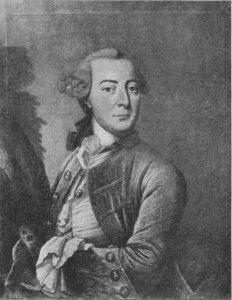
John Brown.

In 1768 (deed issued on 18 June 1768), Olsen sold Maglegaard for 350 Danish rigsdaler to John Brown. As part of the sales agreement, he kept the old farmhouse in Gentofte and the plot that it stood on. Brown was a Scottish merchant who had settled in Denmark in 1746. He constructed a two-storey country house on Strandvejen on his new property. He had already bought nearby Hellerupgård. In November 1771, Brown increased his holdings in the area by also acquiring Tranegaard. Brown established a brickyard on his new estate. In June 1781, Brown also bought Gelreuensand (aka Treuensand) for 3,105 Danish rigsdaler from court painter Christian Peter Getreuer's heirs. These purchases made Brown the second largest landowner in Gentofte Parish, surpassed only by the Bernstorffs at Bernstorff Palace.

In the late 1780s, Brown's trading firm went bankrupt. On 27 May 1789, Maglegård (with Tranegård and Getreuensand) was therefore sold at auction. The buyer, with a winning bid of 8,604 rigsdaler, was chamberlain Giedde, who as her trustee, acted on behalf of Louise Brown, Brown's eldest daughter. Shortly thereafter, she sold Gelreuensand. Maglegård and Tranegård had a combined area of 175 t'nder. The vast estate reached all the way from the coast to Bernstorffsvej.

=== Holck-Winterfeldt ===
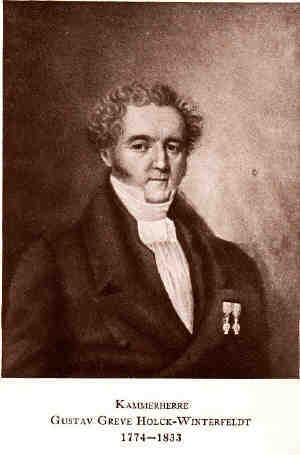
Gustav Holck-Winterfeldt.

In July 1799, Louise Brown sold Maglegård and Tranegaard for 12,432 rigsdaler and 14 skilling to her brother-in-law Gustav Frederik Holck-Winterfeldt (died 1833). As part of the arrangement, John Brown got three rooms on the ground floor of the building at his disposal for the rest of his life time. He died at Maglegaard in 1803.

Hpæcl-Winterfeldt divided the estates into eight parcels of land of which he was only interested in keeping the one with the main building (c. 39.5 tønder). On 6 May 1800, he sold the seven other parcels of land for 5,987 rigsdaler in total. Yjree of the parcels came from land that had belonged to Maglegård. One of them was sold to the owner of nearby Constantia, a restaurateur named Smidt. The two others were sold to ship captain and merchant Jens Lind.

Kohn Brown died at Maglegård on 15 January 1803. His brother and former business partner David Brown died at Maglegård in 1804.

=== Later history ===
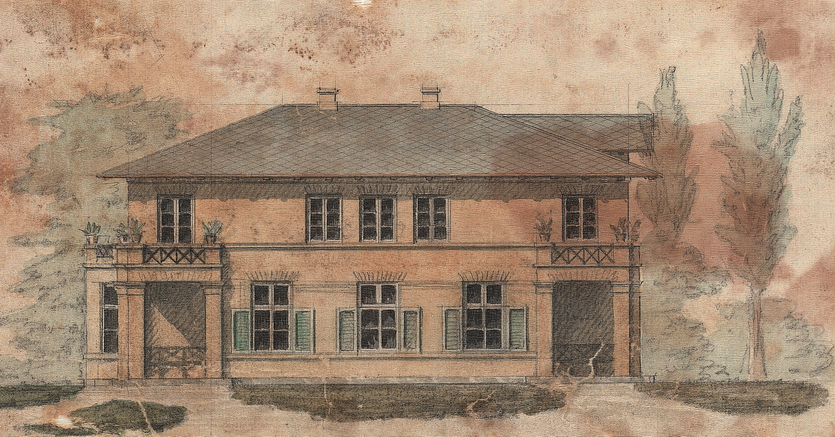
Meldahl's new main building

In 1811, Maglegaard was acquired by harbour captain and alderman of the Pilots Guild in Copenhagen Erich Eskildsen (1776–1856). He was the son of ship builder and shipyard owner in Copenhagen Erik Eskildsen and the brother-in-law of Peter Norden Sølling. He kept the estate until his death 45 years later. In 1856 (deed issued on 24 December), Maglegaard was sold to chamberlain Fritz Holsten-Lehn-Charisius, holder of the Barony of Lehn. He chose to demolish the old main building and charged the architect Ferdinand Meldahl with the design of a new one. The building was completed in c. 1860.

Holsten-Lehn-Charisius diedin 1888. In 1889, Maglegård was sold to A. F. Ibsen. In 1895, he sold the estate to master carpenter S. M. Grumstrup and master mason M. Langberg. They redeveloped part of the remaining land, establishing the streets Annasvej, Bengtasvej, Sigridsvej and Edlevej.

In 1901, Maglegård's main building and what remained of the park was sold to businessman Peter Karberg (1840–1022). Karberg was a former founding partner of Hong Kong-based Arnhold, Karberg and Co., a continuation of the British company Oxford & Co. of which he had also been a partner. Ge had returned to Denmark in 1891. In 1803, Karberg bought two adjacent properties, properties Taffelbay (Jens Lind's former country house) and Lille Taffelbay. In the same year, he heightened Meldahl' with one floor. This was done with the assistance of the architect A. Thejll.

== Fate ==
In 1933, Karberg's widow sold three three properties to a consortium, A/S Øreparken. Later in the same year, A/S Øreparken purchased another old country house, Blidah, remembered for having belonged to the painter Lorentz Frølich. The name of the consortium was changed to A/S Blidah. All the existing buildings were demolished to make way for a Functionalist housing estate. The development was designed by the architectural firm Kooperative Arkitekter. The master plan was created by the architects Edvard Heiberg and Ivar Bentsen created the masterplan. 10 architects (including Heiberg and Bentsen) were involved in the design of the 20 individual buildings.

On 1 July 1918, when a new parish was being created from Hellerup Parish, in anticipation of the completion of Church of the Messiah, it was given the name Maglegård's Parish.Maglegård School was inaugurated in 1909.
