= Mount Pleasant National Guard Armory =

- U.S. National Register of Historic Places
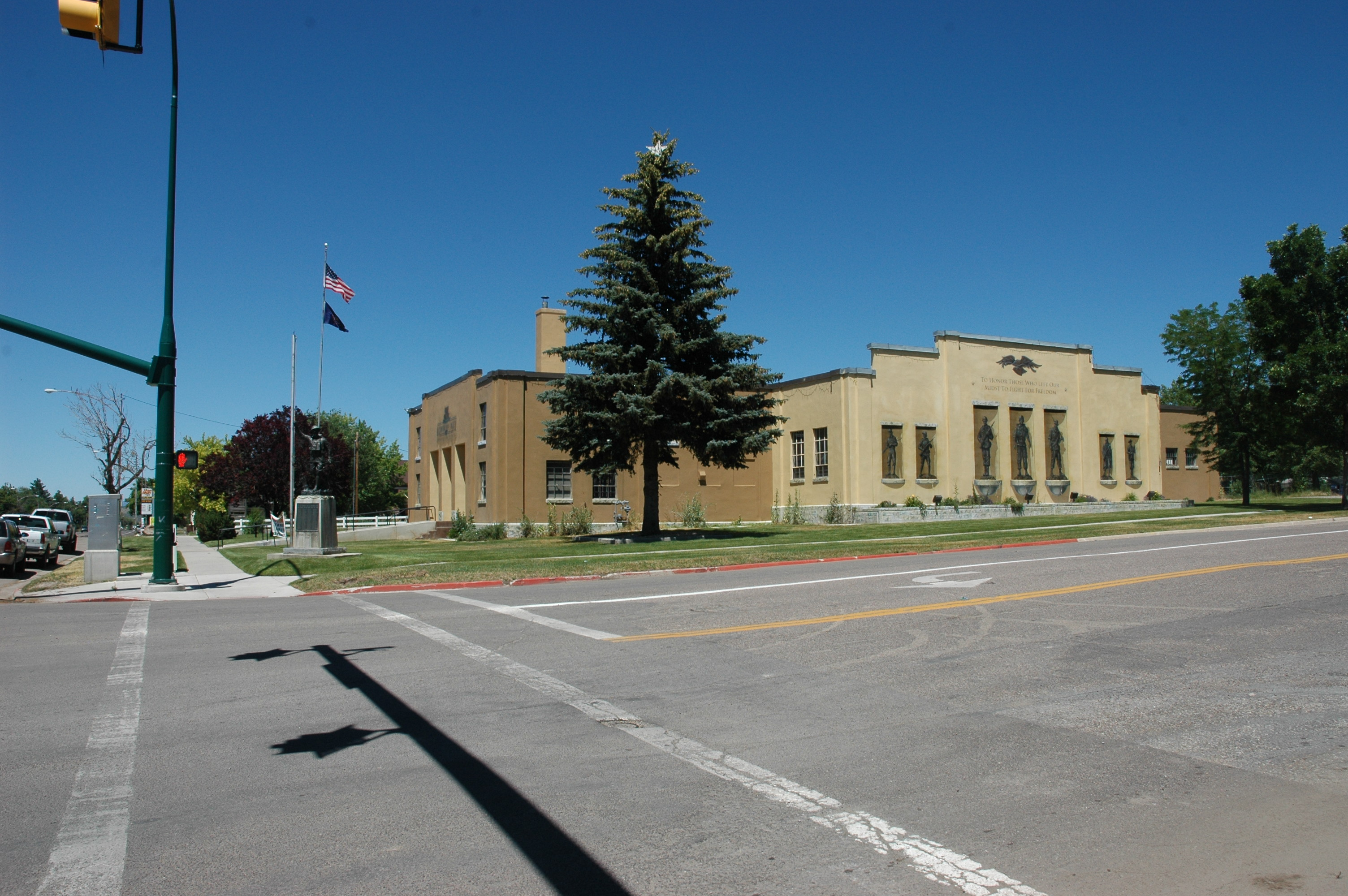
- Photo from 2011

- Location within Utah Location within the United States
- Location: 10 N. State, Mount Pleasant, Utah
- Coordinates: 39.547107°N 111.454806°W
- Area: 0.7 acres (0.28 ha)
- Built: 1936-37
- Built by: G.W. Brand (supervisor); Works Progress Administration
- Architect: Niels P. Larsen
- Architectural style: PWA Moderne
- MPS: Public Works Buildings TR
- NRHP reference No.: 86000740
- Added to NRHP: April 9, 1986

The Mount Pleasant National Guard Armory, at 10 N. State in Mount Pleasant, Utah, was built in 1936-37 as a Works Progress Administration project. It was listed on the National Register of Historic Places in 1986. It is, in 2019, the Mount Pleasant Recreation Center.

It is a PWA Moderne-style two-story, flat-roofed building. It was designed by Salt Lake City architect Niels P. Larsen, who also designed at least six other armories in Utah. Surviving, as of 1986, were the NRHP-listed Manti National Guard Armory and ones in Nephi, Fillmore, and Spanish Fork (the latter was NRHP-listed in 1986, but was delisted in 1996, presumably after being demolished); ones in Logan and Cedar City had been demolished.

The main, south-facing, central facade of the building was transformed, by 2011, into a War memorial.

The building was described as:

It consists of long rectangular block containing the principal entrance and flanking side wings. The front of the main block is broken up into three sections by low-relief pilasters. The center section has three recessed door panels and a slightly raised parapet which announces its importance. [This is the section which has been transformed into a war memorial.] The side wings have taller, stepped parapets and the ends are symmetrically pierced by vertical window panels. The structure is built of brick and has been plastered. It seems likely that the smooth plaster exterior is original. A compatibly styled garage addition was built at the northeast corner of the building....

It was built on land donated by the city. Also on the property was "a two story building which was constructed in 1879 to house the ZCMI branch store at Mt. Pleasant. Its second floor housed the county courthouse and the city council chambers. It also had a large hall for political rallies, plays, etc., so that the building for many years was the "amusement" and community center for the town." (Does that building still exist?)
