= Pavard =

Pavard is a French surname. Notable people with the surname include:

- Benjamin Pavard (born 1996), French footballer
- René Pavard (born 1934), French racing cyclist

== See also ==
- Havard
