= Niels Lassen (farmer) =

Danish farmer

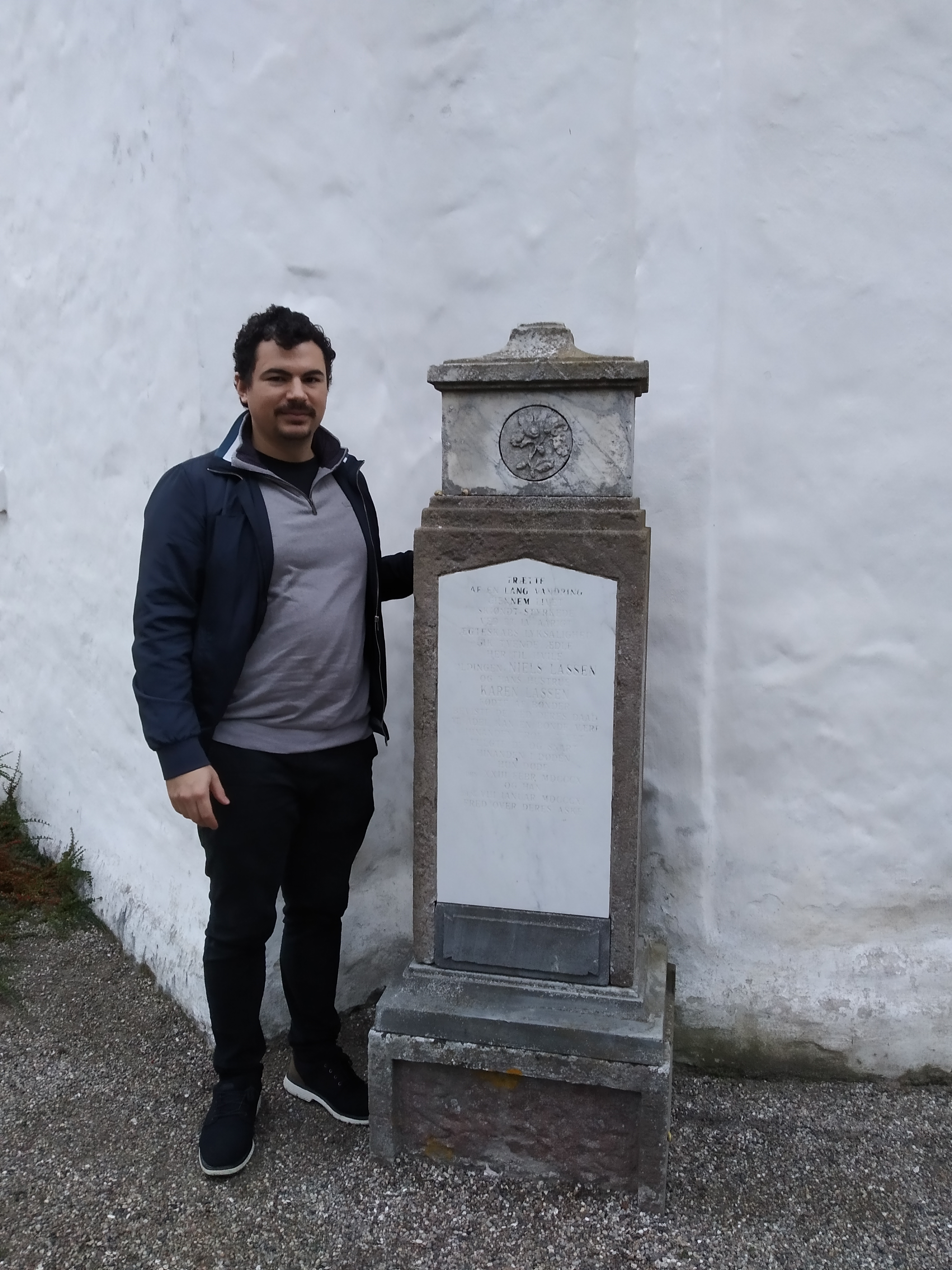
- Sandstone grave monument for Niels and Karen Lassen, approx. 1810, by the choir at Sædder church. Descendant Kevin B. Højgaard-Christiansen stands next to it.
- Born: Approx. 1729
- Died: 8 January 1811
- Known for: Zealand's first expatriate farmer and a forerunner of the Danish agrarian reforms.
- Spouse: Karen Sørensdatter
- Children: Lars Lassen Birthe Kirstine Lassen

Niels Lassen (c. 1729 – 8 January 1811) was a farmer, owner of Sprettingegård farmhouse, master tenant on Turebyholm and Zealand's first relocating farmer (Udflytterbonde) under the Danish "stavnsbånd" a serfdom-like institution. He was the father of "Kammerråd" (chamber council) and landowner Lars Lassen.

== Biography ==
=== First relocating farmer ===
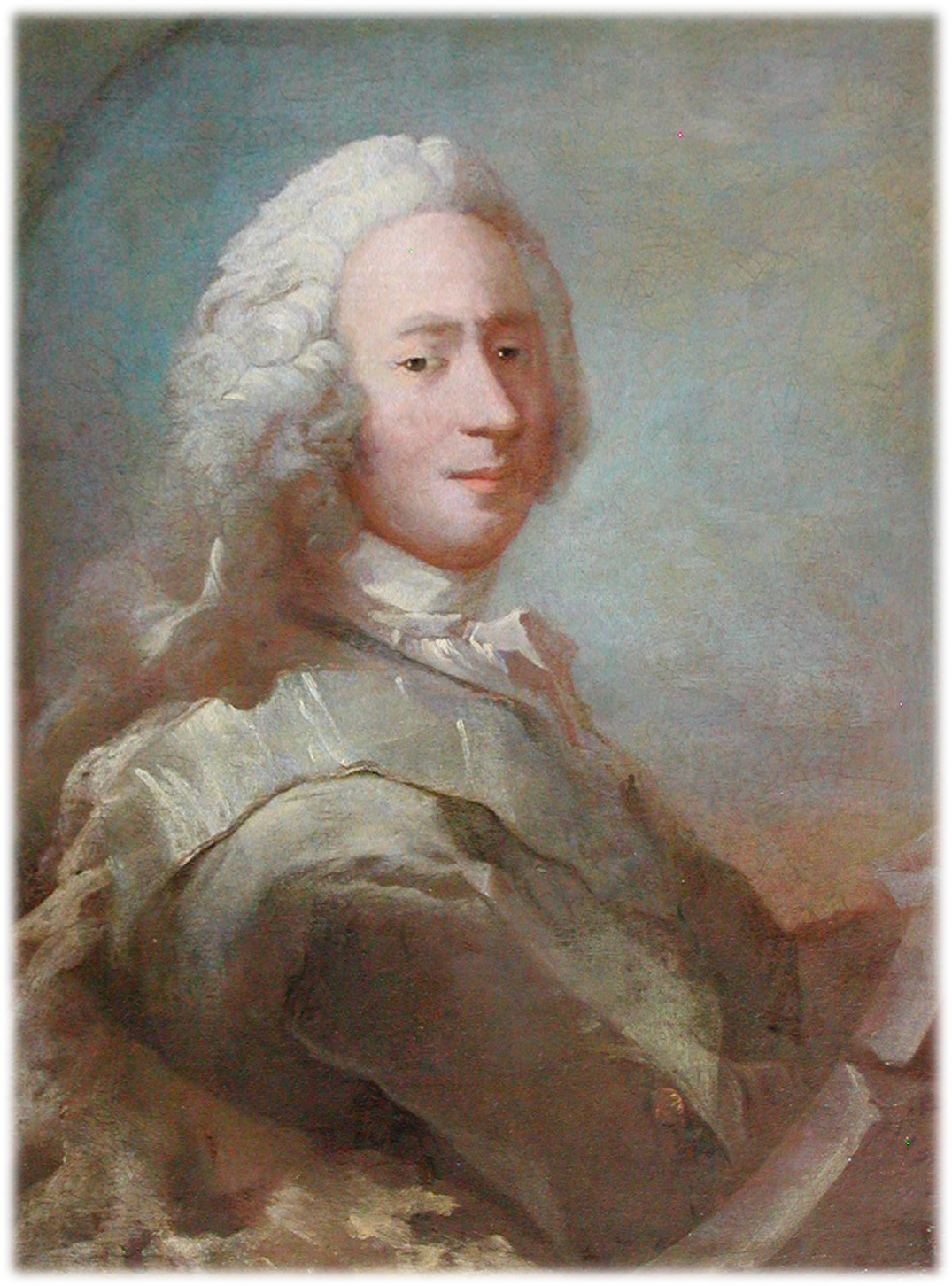
A. G. Moltke

The Danish "stavnsbånd" bonded men between the ages of 14 and 36 to live on the estate where they were born, and the peasants lived under slave-like conditions during their county. around the 18th century, this form was strongly challenged, and several high-ranking Danes worked to convey or remove the Danish staff band, one of them was "Lensgreve" Count A.G. Moltke.

Around the end of the 1750s, it is clear that when the new form of farm operation - from three-way use to couple use - with sharply increasing yields - had been implemented at Bregentved, Adam Gottlob Moltke immediately began the reorganization of the operation on the main farm, Sofiendal in Terslev parish.

When Lassen had seen the changes at Sofiendal, he petitioned A. G. Moltke for permission to employ similar experiments on his farm Sprettingegård, under Turebyholm, which at the time was 9 tdr. Hartkorn. Not only did he obtain the permit for the experiment, but in return for having obtained his lordship in advance, he was left by A. G. Moltke Sprettingegård for inheritance and property. Sprettingegård received land from 2-3 decommissioned or burned farms in Alkestrup. The land thereby went out of the city's joint operation and became an independent use under Turebyholm. Lassen therefore became Zealand's first emigrant farmer before the word took on its meaning and he was the forerunner of the agrarian reforms "Landboreformerne" in the late 1700s. The title "first Zealand emigrant farmer" is otherwise attributed to the scholar Hans Jensen Bjerregaard, Gentofte under Hørsholm, who moved his farm out in 1766, half a dozen years later.

=== Sprettingegård farm ===
Sprettingegård is located in Sædder, near Ulstrup town under the county Turebyholm. Niels Lassen and his wife Karen, Born Sørensdatter (1726–1810), probably took over the newly built Sprettingegård as a "fæstegård" farm at their marriage around 1755.

=== Operations at Sprettingegård ===
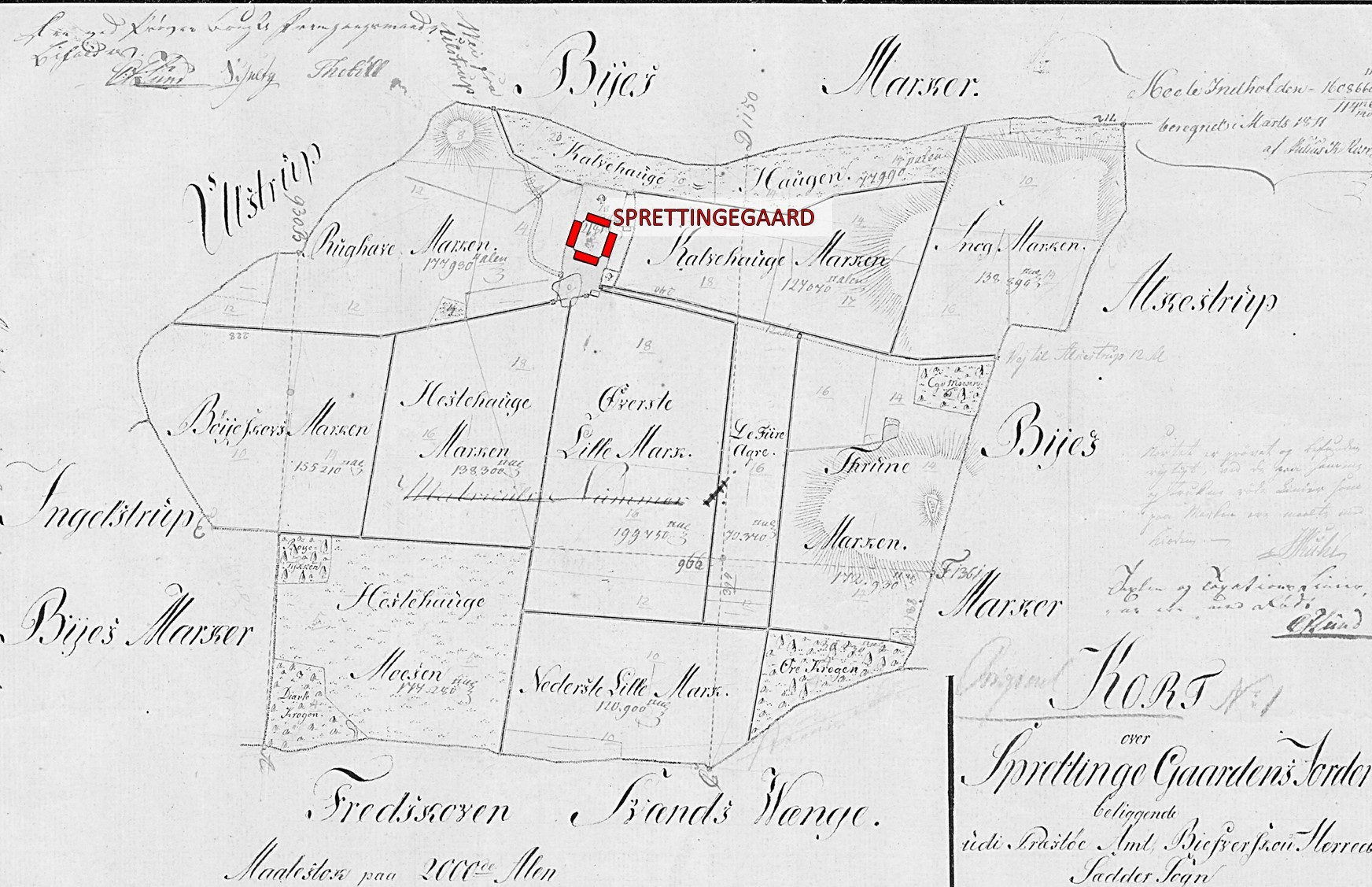
Sprettingegaard Cadastral map 1809

Lassen had his land divided into eleven couplets, which he provided with double ditches and hedges. A. G. Moltke could at the same time emphasize his pride that Niels Lassen had an annual profit of two hundred rdl. The farm also had been newly built of masonry half-timber of stone fired in his own brick kiln. Around 1790, Lassen received the smaller silver medal from Count A.G. Moltke for having built a brick distillery. The smaller silver medal is a prize for agricultural initiatives or good farming, which the estate had for the purpose of promoting new methods, and related to the more well-known prizes from the Royal Agricultural Society, which covered the whole country.

Niels Lassen had also, for several years, cultivated a fairly large area with wheat and with fairly good yields. Wheat was then a grain that was not otherwise grown by farmers. Knowledge was soon inquired about, and in 1768, that is, even at the time when the cities' fields were predominantly cultivated together, several towns bought wheat at Sprettingegården farm house.

=== Operating system on Bistrup estate 1775 ===
In 1775, Mayor Hans Christopher Hersleb, who was also a member of the management of Bistrup estate, proposed the adoption of a surveyor, who together with Niels Lassen was to prepare for the introduction of the new operating system at Bistrup.

=== Master tenant ===
From around 1787, Niels has leased Sprettingegård to Ole Olsen and Niels has moved to Turebyholm as a master tenant.

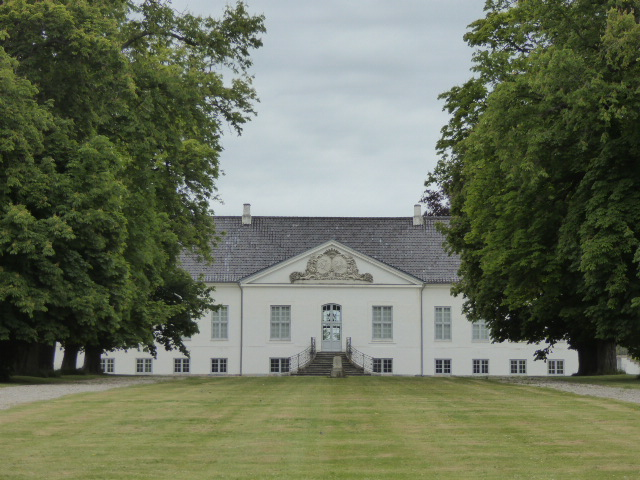
Turebyholm

=== Benzonseje ===
On 5 July 1788, Niels Lassen bought for 2000 rigsdaler 1st priority for 6 farms belonging to Benzonseje Estate (Today Risbyholm) by the Brown brothers. Niels' son Lars Lassen, who had previously been a clerk under his brother-in-law Jacob Rosted at Billesborg, was in this connection appointed manager of Benzonseje estate. The following year, his son Lars Lassen had the opportunity to buy the estate, which he then paid 38,000 Rdl. for.

=== Death and burial ===
Niels dies 1811 at the age of 82 years the year after his wife Karen Sørensdatter who died 1810, 84 years. At Sædder cemetery by the south wall of the choir stands a sandstone monument with a marble top and inlaid marble slab with this following beautiful inscription (translated from Danish)

"TIRED

OF A LONG WALK

THROUGH LIFE

STRONGLY STRENGTHENED

BY A LV (55) YEARS

HAPPINESS OF MARRIAGE

WENT TWO NOBLES

HERE TO REST

OLDINGEN NIELS LASSEN

AND HIS WIFE

KAREN LASSEN

BORN OF FARMERS

THEY PROVED BY THEIR DEED

THAT NOBILITY CAN A FARMER BE

EACH OTHER FAITH IN LIFE

THEY FOLLOWED AND SOON

EACH OTHER IN DEATH

SHE DIED

FEB XXIII MDCCCX

AND HE

THE VIII JANUARY MDCCCXI

PEACE OVER THEIR ASH"
