= Manti National Guard Armory =

- U.S. National Register of Historic Places
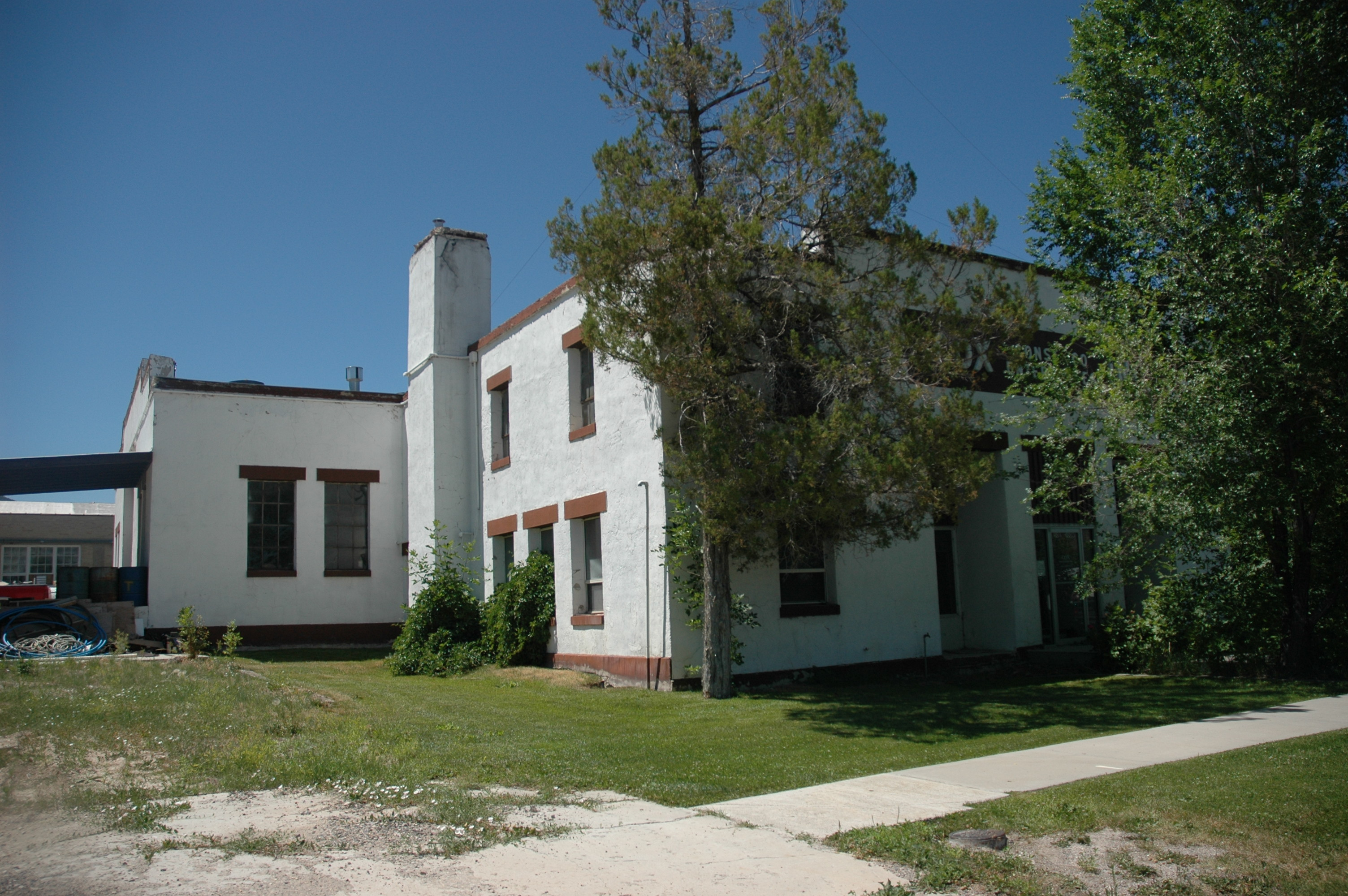

- Location within Utah Location within the United States
- Location: 50 E. One Hundred N, Manti, Utah
- Coordinates: 39°16′00″N 111°38′08″W
- Area: 0.6 acres (0.24 ha)
- Built: 1936-38
- Built by: Works Progress Administration
- Architect: Niels P. Larsen
- Architectural style: Moderne
- MPS: Public Works Buildings TR
- NRHP reference No.: 86000744
- Added to NRHP: April 9, 1986

The Manti National Guard Armory, at 50 E. 100 North in Manti, Utah was built in 1936-38 as a Works Progress Administration project. It was listed on the National Register of Historic Places in 1986.

It is a two-story PWA Moderne-style, flat-roofed building.

It was designed by Salt Lake City architect Niels P. Larsen, who also designed at least six other armories in Utah. Surviving, as of 1986, were the NRHP-listed Mount Pleasant National Guard Armory and ones in Nephi, Fillmore, and Spanish Fork (the latter was NRHP-listed in 1986, but was delisted in 1996, presumably after being demolished); ones in Logan and Cedar City had been demolished.
