= Havdrup =

- Town
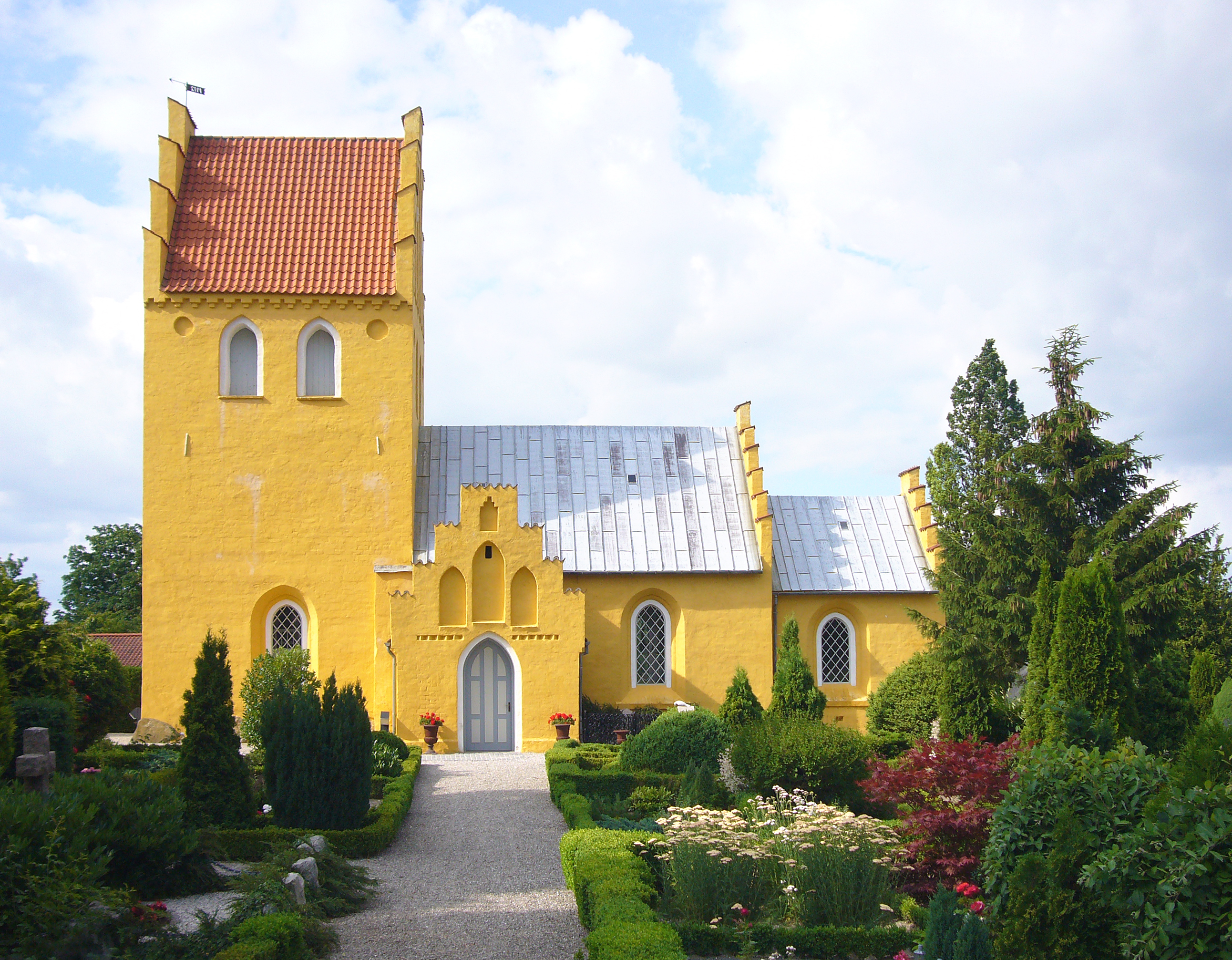
- Havdrup church in the small village of Gammel Havdrup

- Location in Denmark Havdrup (Denmark Region Zealand)
- Coordinates: 55.54512°N 12.1165°E
- Country: Denmark
- Region: Zealand (Sjælland)
- Municipality: Solrød

Area
  - Urban: 2.3 km^{2} (0.89 sq mi)

Population (2026)
  - Urban: 4,599
  - Urban density: 2,000/km^{2} (5,200/sq mi)
  - Gender: 2,296 males and 2,303 females
- Time zone: UTC+1 (CET)
  - Summer (DST): UTC+2 (CEST)
- Postal code: DK-4622 Havdrup

Havdrup is a small railway town straddling the boundary between Solrød and Roskilde municipalities, some 30 km southwest of Copenhagen, Denmark. Havdrup station serves the Little South railway line between Roskilde and Køge. Havdrup had a population of 4,599 (1 January 2026). The original village, now known as Gammel Havdrup, is located about 3 km to the east of the modern railway town.

== History ==
The name Havdrup was first documented in 1265 as Havertorp. The name is derived from the male name Håvard and the suffix -torp.

Havdrup railway station was built in 1870 as part of the new Zealand South Line between Copenhagen and Næstved as well as the ferries to Falster at Masnedø. The location 3 km to the west of the village was selected so that the new station would also serve the Risbyholm estate.

== Notable people ==
- Lars Emil Bruun (1852 in Ulvemose Huse – 1923) a Danish merchant and numismatist
- Aage Rasmussen (1889 – 1983 in Havdrup) a Danish photographer and track and field athlete who competed in the 1912 Summer Olympics
