= Risbyholm =

Manor house in Roskilde Municipality, Denmark

- Interactive map of the Risbyholm area

General information
- Location: Risbyholmvej 5A, 4622 Havdrup, Denmark
- Coordinates: 55°32′48.4″N 12°5′49.36″E
- Completed: 1723
- Client: Peder Benzon

Risbyholm (1721–1904: Benzonseje) is a manor house located in Roskilde Municipality, near Havdrup, some 30 km southwest of Copenhagen, Denmark. The estate covers 528 hectares and comprises the farms Solrødgård, Ørnesæde and Klarkærgård.

== History ==
=== Origins ===
Risby was originally owned by the bishops of Roskilde. After the Reformation, the area came under Roskildegård.

=== Benzonseje ===
The manor was founded as Benzonseje in 1721 when Peder Benzon, a Supreme Court justice, obtained the king's permission to merge several farms. The half-timbered main building was built the following year.

Benzon died in 1733. In 1838, Risbyholm was sold for 10,020 Danish eigsdaler ro Kirstine Catharine Schumacher (née Leegaard). She was the widow of colonel Christian Frederik Schumacher (died 1736). After her death, her children sold Benzonsdal to their relative Carl Christian Schumacher (died 1791). In 1774, it was sold at auction. The buyer was one of Kirstine Catharine Schumacher 's sons, Nicolai Frederik Schumacher, who held the title of Councillor of War (krigsråd).

In 1787, John Brown, a Scottish-born merchant and ship owner, purchased the property in auction for 60,000 Danish rigsdaler. In 1788, he sold it to his brother, David Brown, the governor of Tranquebar, who sold it again the following year.

During David Brown's years as owner, Benzonseje was managed by Lars Lassen. In 1799, he Lassen bought the estate from Brown. Lassen was also associated qwith the estates Rosengård, Adamshøj, Egholm, Krabbesholm and Meilgaard.

In 1804, Lassen sold Benzonseje to one L. Olsen, The estate changed hands many times over the one hundred years. Later in the same year, it was sold to pastor at Gerlufsmagle Church Edvard Sneedorph Hammer.

=== 20th century ===
Anna Hebert, the widow after the previous owner, Christian Frederik Harald, changed the name of the property to Risbyholm in 1903.

== Today ==
The estate has a total area of 540 hectares of which 522 hectares are farmland and six hectares are woodland.

== Owners ==
- (1721-1737) Peder Benzon
- (1737-1755) Kirstine Catharine Leegaard, gift Schumacher
- (1755-1775) Carl Christian Schumacher
- (1775-1784) Nikolaj Frederik Schumacher
- (1784-1788) John Brown
- (1788-1789) David Brown
- (1789-1804) Lars Lassen
- (1804) L. Olsen
- (1804-1829) Edvard Sneedorph Hammer
- (1829-1834) various owners
- (1834-1857) August Busck
- (1857-1873) P. A. Herbert
- (1873-1903) Christian Frederik Harald Holme
- (1903-1917) Anna Hebert, gift Holme
- (1917-1928) N. P. Nielsen
- (1928-1940) Carl G. Udsen
- (1940-1968) C. G. Udsen
- (1968-1998) Vagn Clausen
- (1988-2008) Claus Clausen
- (2001-2008) Christian Clausen
- (2008- ) Risbyholm Aps
