= Lars Emil Bruun =

Danish merchant and numismatist

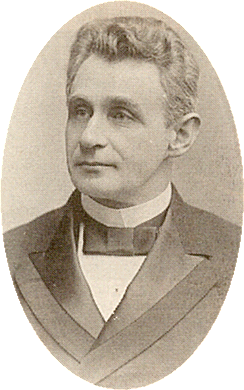
- Born: 29 March 1852; Havdrup, Denmark
- Died: 21 November 1923 (aged 71); Copenhagen, Denmark
- Occupation: Businessman
- Known for: Coin and medal collection

Lars Emil Bruun (29 March 1852 – 21 November 1923) was a Danish merchant and numismatist. He established a company in 1883 that specialized in the packing and wholesaling of butter. His collection of coins and medals, valued at 500 million Danish kroner, or 73 million USD, was kept at the National Museum of Denmark for a century, but was, in accordance with his will, sold at auction 100 years after his death, in 2024.

== Early life and education ==
Bruun was born in Ulvemose Huse, in the parish of Havdrup, in 1852. He apprenticed as a merchant in Holbæk from 1867 and later studied at Grüner's business academy before working for several large enterprises.

== Business career ==
In 1883, Bruun established his own company which was involved in the packing and wholesaling of butter. The company grew fast and completed acquisitions of several competing companies.

== Coin and medal collection ==
Bruun collected coins from an early age, and with his increasing wealth his collection developed into one of the largest private collections of its time of Danish, Norwegian, Swedish and British coins and medals. In 1914 and 1918, he sold the Swedish part of his collection. In 1922, shortly before his death, he acquired an extensive coin collection which had belonged to the counts of Brahesminde. The British part of his collection was sold in auction in London after his death, except for the coins from Northumberland, East Anglia and Ireland, which were donated to the Royal Danish Coin and Medal Collection at the National Museum of Denmark.

According to Bruun's will, his collection of coins, bank notes and medals from Denmark, Norway, Sweden, Schlesvig and Holstein, as well as his numismatic library, was to act as a back-up for the Royal Danish Coin and Medal Collection for a period of one hundred years, before being sold for the benefit of his descendants. It was initially deposited at the Museum of National History at Frederiksborg Castle, but was transferred to Nationalbanken (the central bank of Denmark) in Copenhagen.

=== Sale of the collection ===
Ahead of the sale the National Museum of Denmark exercised a right of first refusal that dated from Bruun's 1922 purchase of the Bille-Brahe collection, acquiring seven Dano-Norwegian coins struck between 1591 and the late 17th century. The purchase, of six gold coins and one silver coin, was paid for with a donation of 7.7 million kroner from the society Den kgl. Mønt- og Medaillesamlings Venner.

The collection, insured for 500 million Danish kroner (about US$72.5 million), was consigned to the American auction house Stack's Bowers Galleries, which began dispersing it in a series of sales in 2024. The first sale, of 286 lots, was held in Copenhagen on 17 September 2024 and realised 14.82 million euros ($16.5 million) after nearly eight hours of bidding. Its leading lot was a gold noble of King Hans dated 1496, described in the catalogue as the first gold coin and the first dated coin struck in Denmark; it sold for 1.2 million euros ($1.34 million), which the auction house said was a record price for a Scandinavian coin.

Further sales followed, and a fourth part was held in New York in March 2026. According to Stack's Bowers, nearly 5,000 lots from the collection had realised more than 32 million euros, including buyer's premium, by the end of 2025.
