= Lars Lassen =

Danish landowner and commissioner (1761–1823)

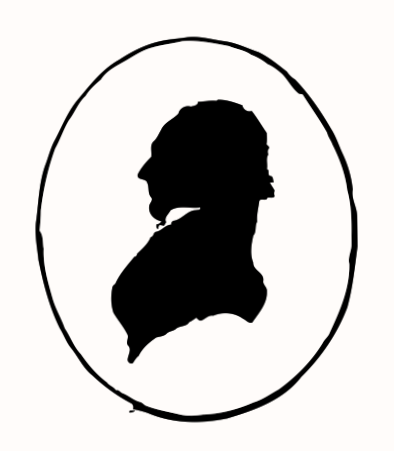
- Born: 6 June 1761
- Died: 16 February 1823 (aged 61); Rønnovsholm, Denmark
- Spouse: Johanne Kirstine (née Meyer)
- Parents: Niels Lassen (father); Karen Lassen (Født Sørensdatter) (mother)

Signature
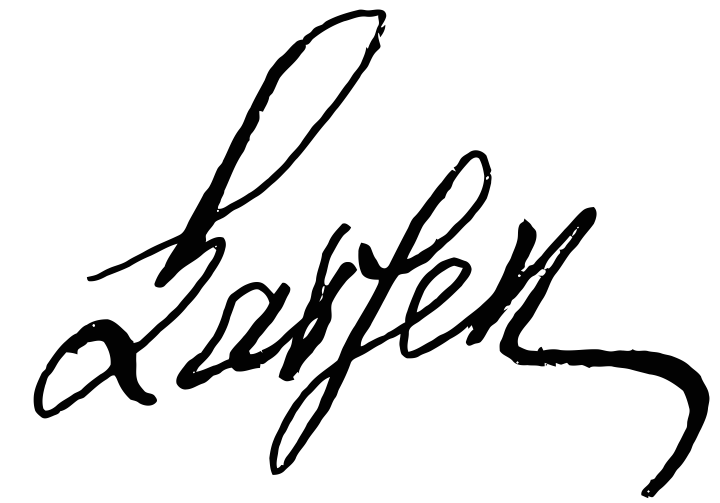

Lars Lassen (1761 – 6 June 1823) was a Danish landowner, proprietor, chamber councilor "kammerråd" and agricultural commissioner. He was the son of Niels Lassen (1729–1811) and Karen Sørensdatter (1726–1810). Lassen owned the estates Benzonseje (Risbyholm), Rosengård, Adamshøj, Egholm, Krabbesholm and Meilgaard. He was married to Johanne Kirstine Meyer (1763–1846), who was the daughter of Procurator Peter Simonsen Meyer, and they had approximately 8 children together.

== Biography ==
Lars Lassen was born at Sprettingegård in Sædder, and baptized on 16 February 1761 in Sædden Church.

He is the son of Niels Lassen and Karen (born Sørensdatter) of Sprettingegård. Lars Lassen, like his father, had a great interest in agriculture and management on farms, and in 1787 he worked for his sister Kirstine and brother-in-law Jacob Rosted as a "Servant Clerk" In 1789 he married Johanne Kirstine Meyer, daughter of procurator Peter Simonsen Meyer and Ingeborg Margretha Dørup.

=== Benzonseje Manor ===
Lars Lassen's father, Niels Lassen, had in 1788 bought first priority from John Brown and his brother David Brown for Benzonseje's six farms for 2000 Rdl. which may have resulted in Lars becoming the manager of their estate Benzonseje. The following year, as a result of financial difficulties, David Brown began to auction off and subdivide the land. The main farm itself with the remaining peasant farms as well as Ørsted and Snoldeløv Churches were sold to Lars Lassen for 38,000 Rdl., With which Lars also paid those who had priorities in the Manor house, one to Justice Boertmann of 30,000 Rdl. and one to de Coninck & Reiersen at 8000 Rdl. In 1804, Lassen sold the estate to the former tenant farmer Jens Olsen. In the Deed and Mortgage Protocol it can be read that Lars Lassen sold a large part of his properties to the former tenant farmers. The background for this can perhaps be sought in the generally poor conditions in agriculture at that time, or that Lassen had seen other possibilities.

==== Conduct on the state of arable farming in Zealand and Møn ====
Lassen must have had some experience with agriculture, from his parents and as an estate manager. He was interviewed by the agricultural economist Greger's Otto Bruun Begtrup's for his book on Operation for the state of agriculture in Zealand and Møen, where Lassen talks about his experience with, among other things, feeding cattle with green clover ryegrass, his large and beautiful Dutch (a cattle herd kept for milk production) which he himself administers, and about the successful experiment with a "piil plant" and with the acacia tree.

=== Rosengaard and Adamshøj ===
In 1796 he bought Rosengård (Kværkebygård), which he sold in 1806. Adamshøj, which Lassen also owned, belonged to this farm.

=== Egholm castle and Krabbesholm Estate ===
In 1804 he bought together with Count Christian Conrad Sophus Danneskiold-Samsøe the Egholm castle and Krabbesholm estate for 284,000 Rd. The two companions divided two years later the estates, so that Count Christian Conrad Sophus Danneskiold Samsøe took over Krabbesholm, while Lars Larsen acquired Egholm for 189,333 Rd. He sold Egholm in 1809 for 330,000 Rd.

=== Meilgaard Manor ===
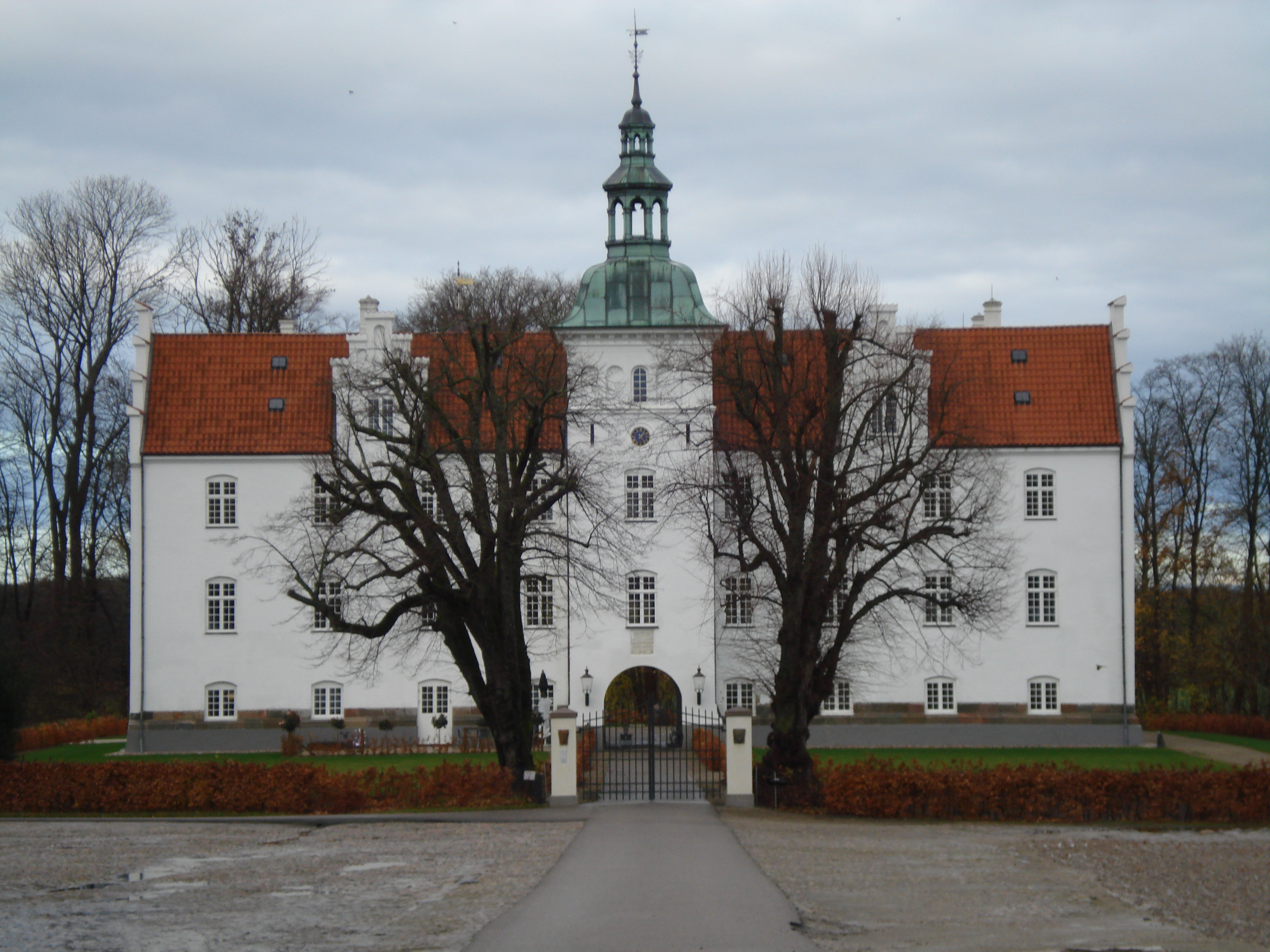
Meilgaard

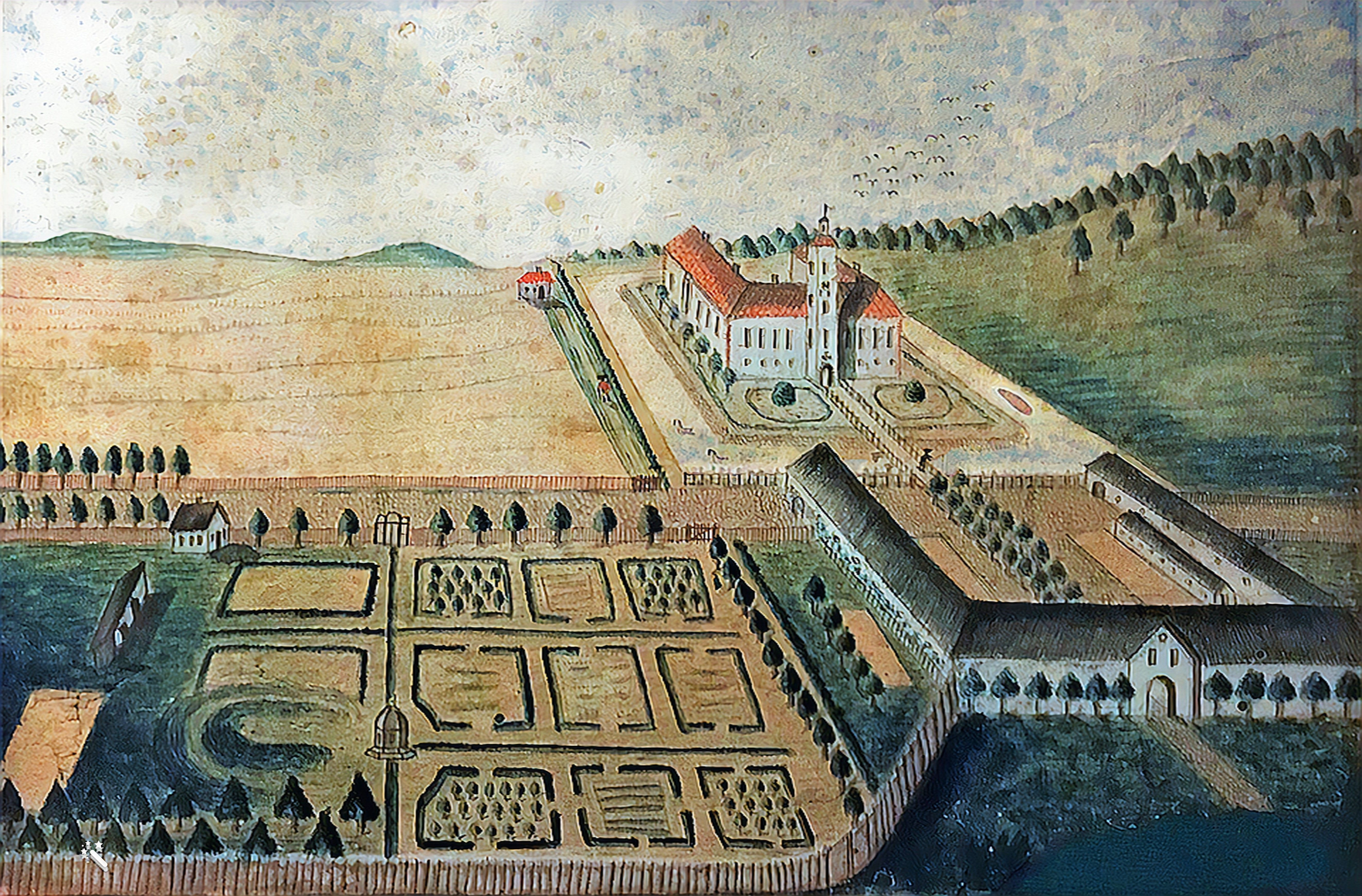
Meilgaard. Unknown artist 1800

Count Adam Christopher Knuth had owned Meilgård in Glesborg parish for a short period between 1804-1810 and then sold it to Lars Lassen, from which the breeding farm Birkelund was established to his son Niels Lassen. In the hard years after the state bankruptcy in 1813, Lassen lost all his wealth and the estate was taken over by the state in 1824 due to tax arrears.

=== Rønnovsholm Manor ===
Lars Lassen lived with his wife Johanne Meyer with their son Niels on the Rønnovsholm estate in Vrejlev, where he died of old age and was buried at Vrejlev church.

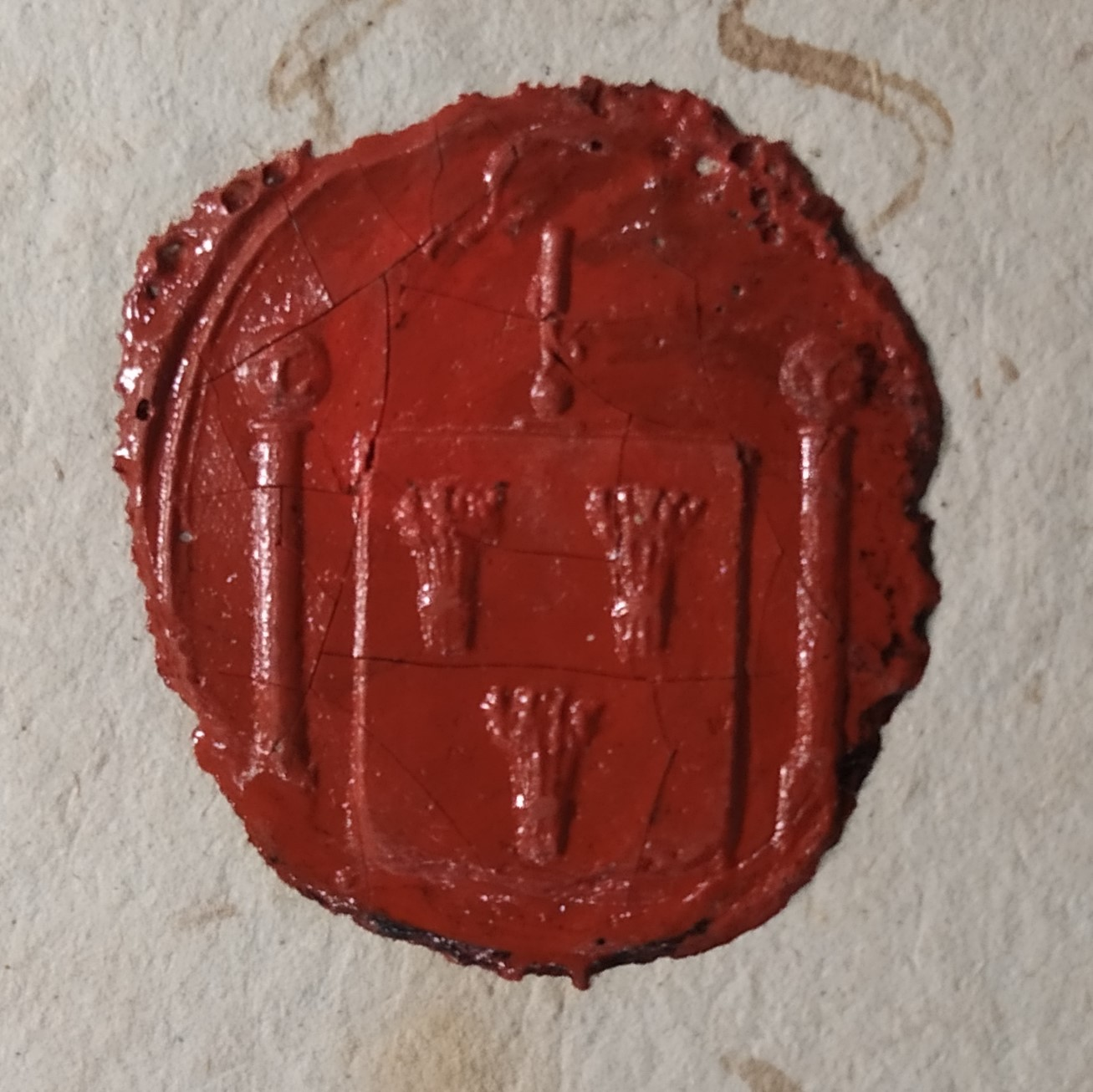
Lars Lassens seal

== Seal and shield (heraldry) ==
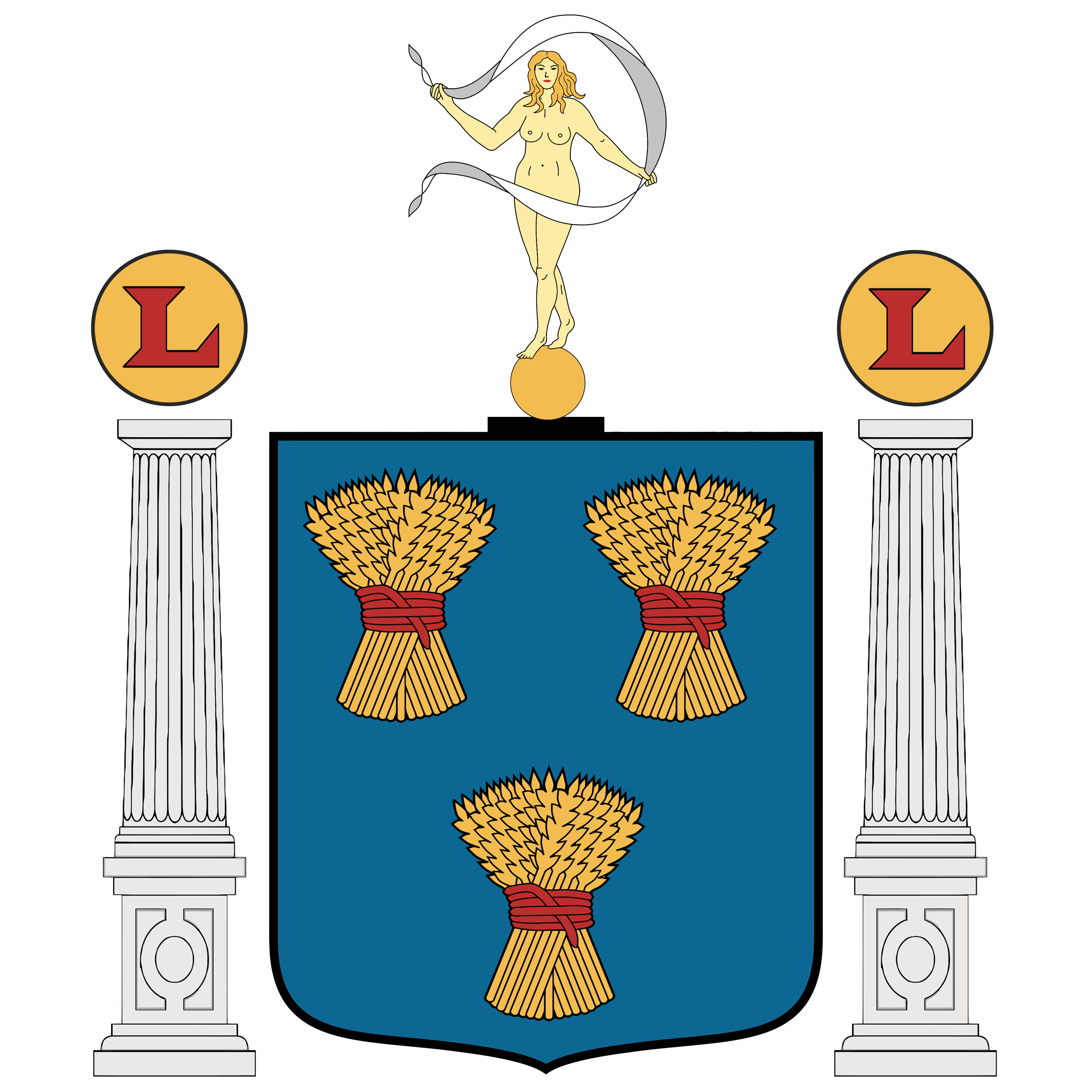
Lars Lassens heraldry

Lars Lassen's seal can be found in Meilgård Estate's Accounting Book. in the seal Lars uses his heraldry Shield containing three haystacks. On each side of the shield there are Greek columns where above each column there is a sphere with an "L" in each sphere. On top is the goddess Fortuna. The colors are unknown and therefore just a guess.

== Marriage, children and family ==
Lars Lassen married Johanne Kirstine Meyer on 27 June 1789. Johanne was born on Krogsgård in Kolby and she is the daughter of procurator Peter Simonsen Meyer and his wife Ingeborg Margretha Meyer (Born: Dørup). Johannes' grandfather "Simon Jacobsen Meyer" was as a young lackey for Lisbeth Bille on Sæbygård and became 12 April 1714 birch bailiff to Sæbygårds Birk and 20 Nov. 1727 also judge of Voergårds Birk. Jørgen Bille mentions him as follows in 1730: "he was the most knowledgeable and best "Birkedommer" Birch judges in Vendsyssel". After his appointment as town bailiff in Sæby, he moved there. His seal bears a shield in which a figure standing on a bullet as well as a helmet with two wings. He was married to Kirsten Antonisdatter Bering. The couple had children baptized in Sæby 1733 and 1738; they died young; but before Meyers came to Sæby, they had a son Peter Simonsen Meyer, b. Knaeverhede ".

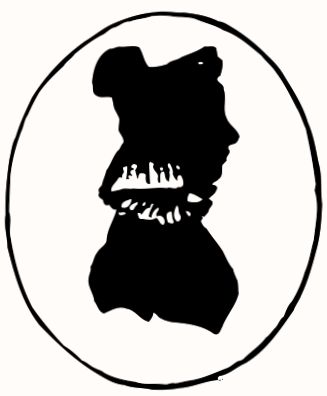
Silhouette portrait of Johanne Kirstine Lassen (Born Meyer)

Lars and Johanne had at least eight children.

Children
Name	Born	Died	Comments
Christian Lassen	1800		Christian had 2 children. The first was a daughter named Inger Christiansdatter Lassen whom he had with Frideriche Christoffersdatter Riis. The second child was a son named Emil Christiansen which Christian had with Anne Scholastica Wielandt. Some of Emil's living descendants are today named: Christiansen, Højgaard-Christiansen and Højgod. Actor Rasmus Bech Christiansen was Emil's foster son.
Karen Margrethe Lassen	1790		Remained unmarried
Ingeborg Lassen	1790		
Niels Lassen	1791	1860	Formerly owner of Kalstrup Mill and Odden Manor. Niels later becomes a forest owner and lives in the forest house in Svendstrup school district. He marries Christiane Møller.
Peter Lassen		7.9.1877	Tenant of Tjele Estate 1820–1825, owner Herningsholm estate 1825–1831, owner Rønnovsholm manor 1832–1855. Married twice. First time with: Abelone Lassen, Together they have 6 children. Second marriage to: Birgitte Laurentzia Andrea Kabell.
Ane Birgita Lassen	1796	1845	Married Michael Henrich Johan Daniel Treschow, to Sjørupgaard
Charlotte Lassen	1785		
Laurence (Laura) Christine Lassen	23.2.1805	15.4.1849	Married to Valdemar Møller from Hjørring, head of the first overseas emigrant company from Denmark.
