= Dronning Caroline Mathilde (DAC ship) =

1769 Danish East Indiaman ship

Dronning Caroline Mathilde, later renamed Ganges, following the arrest of her namesake, Princess Caroline-Mathilde of Denmark, was an East Indiaman of the Danish Asiatic Company, built in 1769. She sailed on seven expeditions to the Rast Indies.

== Construction ==
The Dronning Caroline Mathilde was built for the Danish Asiatic Company at Fabritius & Wever's dockyard in Copenhagen. Her bilbrev was issued on 6 November 1769. She was named in honour of Princess Caroline-Mathilde of Denmark. In January 1773, after her namesake had been compromised by her affair with Struense, she was renamed Ganges.

== Career ==
=== As Dronning Caroline Mathilde ===
1769-1771

Dronning Caroline Mathilde departed from Copenhagen in 1769, bound for Tranquebar. She arrived back in Copenhagen in 1771.

1771-1773

She departed from Copenhagen in 1771, bound for Tranquebar. She arrived at Tranquebar in July 1772. She departed from Tranquebar in February 1773.

=== As Ganges ===
1773-1775

She was captained by Diderich Bagge on her first expedition to Tranquebar under the new name. Her travel pass (afgangspas) was issued in December 1773. She arrived at Tranquebar in June 1774.

She set sail from Tranquebar in February 1775, bound for Copenhagen. Hermann Abbestée and his family were on board the ship as passengers. Abbestée had just resigned from the post as interim governor of the colony after spending 13 years. The ship reached Copenhagen on 17 August 1775.

1776-1777

She was captained by E. Junge on her next expedition to Tranquebar in 1776-1777. Her travel pas was issued in March 1776. She arrived at Tranquebar in September 1776.

1778-1780

She was again captained by E. Junge on her next expedition to Tranquebar and Frederiksbagore in 1778-1780. Her travel pass was issued in March 1778. A young Jacob Brønnum Scavenius served as acting supercargp (officially as assistant but there was no supercargo) on the expedition. Scacenius made friends with Johan Leonhard Fix during his stay in Frederiksnagore. On the way back to Copenhagen, Ganges called at Tranquebar. This gave Scavenius an opportunity to apply was for the vacant position as 1st Assistant in Frederiksnagore. He ended up spending 15 years in India.

Ganges set sail from Tranquebar in March 1779, bound for Copenhagen.

1780-1782

She was captained by O. Selvog on her next expedition to Tranquebar in 1780-1782. Ger travel pas was issued in October 1780. She arrived at Tranquebar in July 1781.

1782-1785

The Ganges was captained by Capt. Haaber on her last expedition to Danish India in 1782-1785. Her travel pas was issued in November 1782. She departed from Serampore in December 1674, bound for Copenhagen.
