= Hermann Abbestée =

Danish colonial governor (1728–1794)

Peter Hermann Abbestée
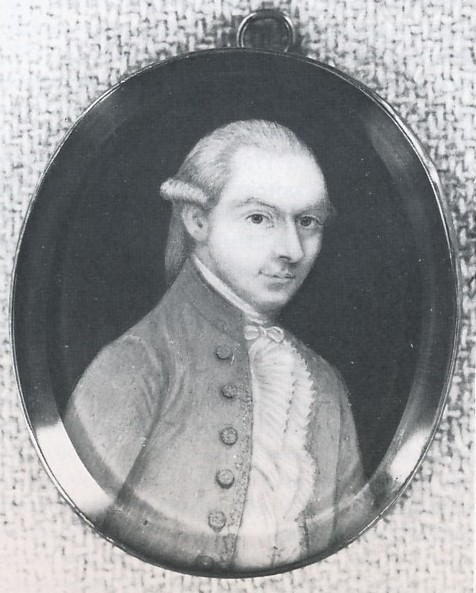

Governor of Danish India
- In office 1779–1788
- Monarch: Christian VII
- Preceded by: None
- Succeeded by: Peter Anker

Personal details
- Born: Peter Hermann Abbestée; 29 July 1728 Copenhagen, Denmark
- Died: 29 December 1794 (aged 66) Copenhagen, Denmark
- Spouse: Françoise Lange (m. 1768)

Hermann Abbestée (29 July 1728 – 29 December 1794) was Danish governor of Tranquebar from 1762 to 1775 and the first royal governor of Danish India from 1779 to 1788. He served as one of the seven directors of the Danish Asiatic Company from 1775 to 1778 and was also active as a trader.

== Early life and background ==
Abbestée was born on 29 July 1728 in Copenhagen, the son of vintner Helvig Abbestée (1697–1742) and Maria Barbara Fabritius (1704–75). His father and mother—who were uncle and niece—belonged to the city's German Reformed congregation. His father went bankrupt for the second time in 1738. His mother was the younger sister of Michael Fabritius and Just Fabritius. After his father's death, his mother married the director of the Danish Asiatic Company, Peter van Hurk (c. 1697–1775).

== Career ==
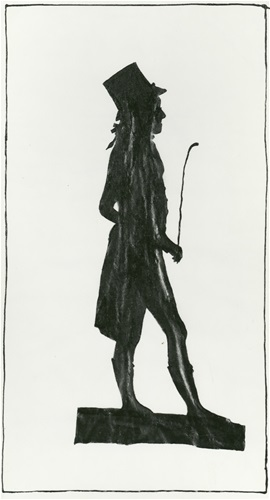
Silhouette of Hermann Abbestée

In 1752, Abbestée was employed by the Danish Asiatic Company as a trade assistant in Tranquebar. He arrived in 1753 on board the company's ship Sydermanland. He was in 1755 sent on a mission to Travancore to negotiate a factory in Colachel under his own management. He was its first Opperhoofd but was already the following year appointed as Opperhoofd of the factory in Calicut.

In 1760, Abbestée returned to Tranquebar and upon H. J. Forch's death, on 29 April 1761, was elected as the colony's acting governor. In 1775, he was succeeded by David Brown. He and his family returned to Copenhagen in the Danish Asiatic Company's frigate Ganges. The ship set sail from Tranquebar in February 1775, bound for Copenhagen. She reached Copenhagen on 27 August 1775.

Abbestée was appointed one of the seven directors of the Danish Asiatic Company. He represented the company in the commission which was set up in connection with the transfer of the East Asiatic colonies to the state in 1777. In the same year, he was appointed the first royal governor of Danish India and was granted the rank of Brigadier. He and his family boarded the ship Dronning Juliana Maria in December, bound for Tranquebar, but the voyage ran into complications and did not arrive until 16 January 1779. In 1782, he successfully applied for permission to leave his office and return to Copenhagen. It was granted him but due to deaths among his colleagues, he ended up acting as governor until finally being replaced by Peter Anker in 1788. He returned to Copenhagen in 1789.

Alongside his office as governor, Abbestée also worked as a trader, partly backed by Anglo-Indian capital.

== Personal life and legacy ==
On 26 December 1768 Abbestée married Françoise Lange (15 January 1749 – 28 March 1779) in Tranquebar. Their daughter Marie Barbara (1770–1832) was married to Conrad Lensgreve Blücher af Altona (1764–1845). Abbestée also had another daughter, Pauline (1772–1801), by another unidentified slave. Pauline's first marriage was to J. N. Müller (−1793) and the second to Christian Tullin Boalth (1767–1822). She was the mother of admiral Catharina Pauli (1797–1856). Her daughter Fanny (1795–1833) married William Halling.

Abbestée purchased Amaliegade 14 in Copenhagen shortly prior to his death in 1794. He had inherited the country house Rustenborg in Kongens Lyngby from his foster father in 1775.
