= Peter Applebye =

Danish industrialist (1709–1774)

Peter Applebye (5 October 1709 – 13 August 1774) was a Danish industrialist. Applebys Plads in Copenhagen, the former site of his shipyard and ropewalk, is named after him.

== Early life and education ==
There has been some debate about the parentage of Applebye. Whilst a baptism record dated 25 September 1710 exists for a Peter Appleby, son of John and Susanna, baptised in Holy Trinity, Gosport, Hampshire, this record appears to refer to a different Peter Appleby, most likely a cousin. Of more import is the known record of his apprenticeship, which cites one Francis Apleby as his father.

== Career ==
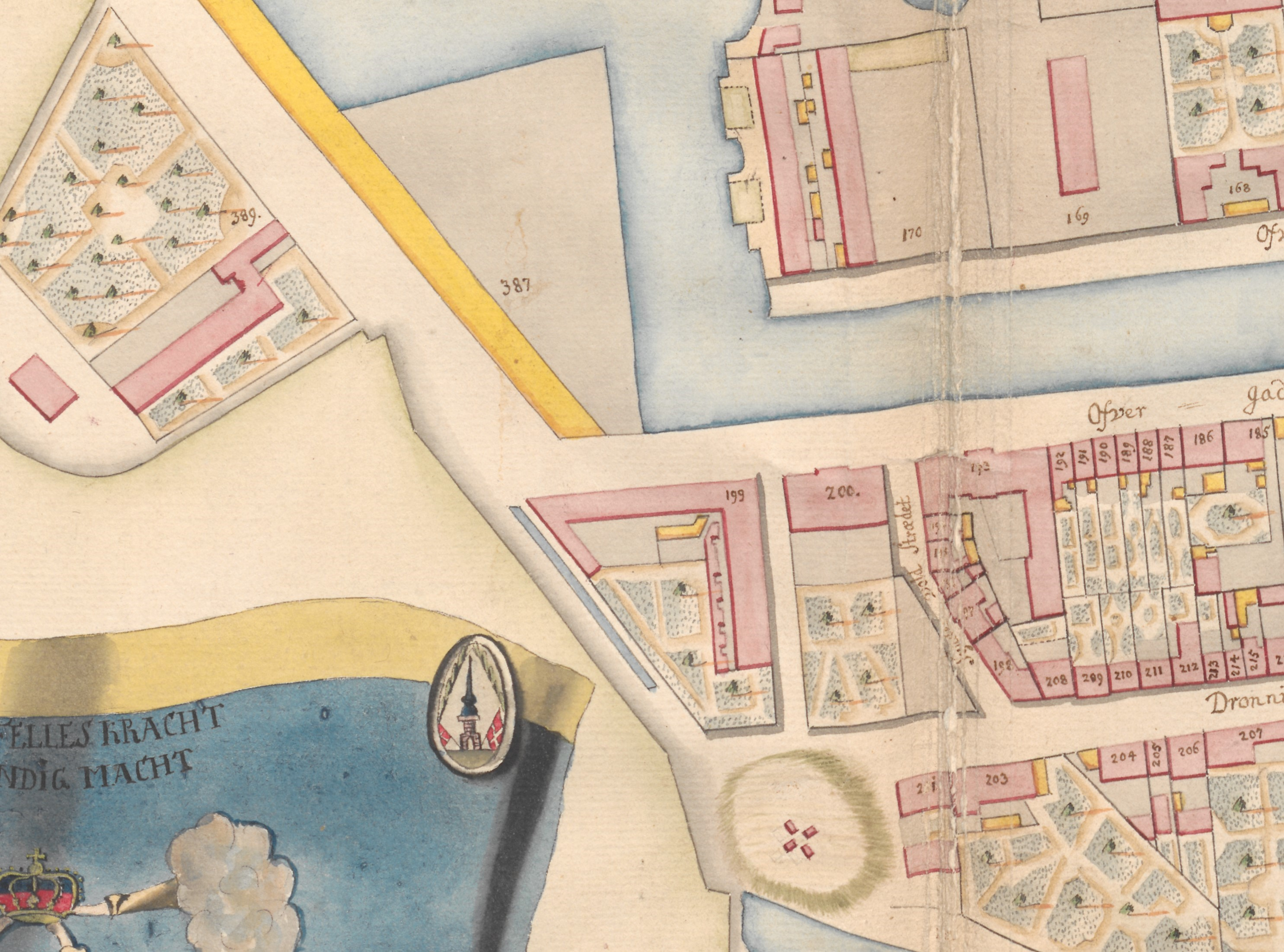
Applebye's property No. 199 seen in a detail from Christian Gedde's map of Christianshavn Quarter, 1757

Appleby was born in Gosport, Hampshire, the son of Francis Appleby. Aged 16, he was articled to Thomas Linze, a rope maker in royal service, and worked there until 1733. In 1737, he was charged with modernizing the ropewalk at the Royal Naval Dockyards at Nyholm in Copenhagen. In 1739, he was granted permission to establish his own ropewalk.

In 1742, he acquired the right to reclaim an area at the southern end of Christianshavn. It was later expanded by royal gifts in 1745, 1748 and 1757. He established a dockyards on the land in 1769 and was also the owner of a sugar refinery and sails and canvas factory in Odense.

Applebye was also active in trade on the colonies with his own fleet of merchant ships.

== Personal life ==
Applebye married Anna Pattridge (more likely a mistranscription of "Partridge") on 9 August 1735 in Fleet, Hampshire. His son Peter Applebye Jr. and son-in-law John Brown squandered away his fortune soon after his death.

== Sources ==
- Albert Fabritius: Peter Applebye in Dansk Biografisk Leksikon, 3 edition, Gyldendal 1979-84. Retrieved 3 September 2019
- Source
- Source
