= David Brown (1734–1804) =

Scottish-Danish merchant and shipowner (1734–1804)

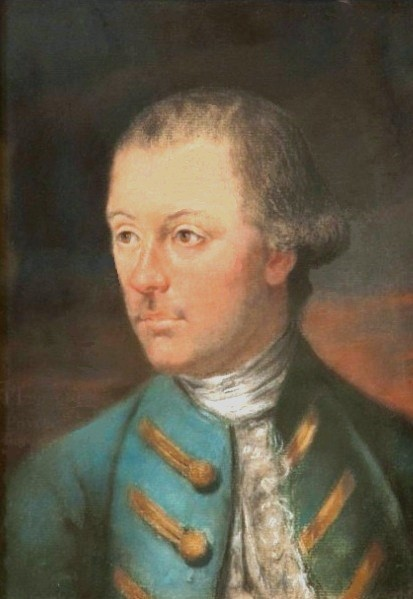

Governor of Tranquebar
- In office 14 February 1775 – 17 January 1779
- Monarch: Christian VII
- Preceded by: Hermann Abbestée
- Succeeded by: Hermann Abbestée

Personal details
- Born: David Brown; 24 June 1734 Dalkeith, Scotland
- Died: 13 May 1804 (aged 69) Helsinge, Denmark

David Brown (24 June 1734 – 13 May 1804) was a Scottish-Danish merchant and shipowner. His trading house, established in a partnership with his brother John Brown (1723–1808) was active in overseas trade. He served as Lord Governor of Tranquebar in Danish India from February 1774 to January 1779.

== Early life ==
Brown was born in Dalkeith, Scotland, the son of William Brown and Margeret Brown. He came to Denmark in 1757 and was first employed as a clerk at the Nicolai Fenwich trading house in Helsingør. In 1750 he came to Copenhagen.

== Career ==
=== Founded John & David Brown ===
David and John Brown founded John & David Brown in 1759. It owned its own fleet of merchant ships which traded in the Danish West Indies. The firm offered commission, speculation and exchange trading. Its vessels mainly had the Caribbean and the Mediterranean as their destinations, and the trading house eventually came to play a significant role in the maintenance of the West Indian trade. In 1781 he bought the Unrost shipyard. The name of the firm was changed to John & William Brown & Co. in 1782.

=== Danish India ===
On 14 February 1775, Brown succeeded Hermann Abbestée as Lord Governor of Tranquebar. His term ended on 17 January 1779.

== Property ==
In 1788, David Brown bought Benzonseje Manor from his brother. He later sold it again to the estate administrator Lars Lassen in 1789.

== Personal life ==
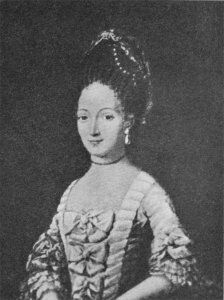
David Brown's first wife, Anne Brown

Brown married Anna Fenwick (1741–1776). She was a daughter of Nicolas Fenwick, merchant in Helsingør, and his wife Elisabeth Fenwick née Watson. She died in Tranquebar in 1776. He then married Mary Forbes (1751–1827). His first wife bore him the following children: William Brown, Margrethe Elisabeth (Betzy) Brown, Nicolas Brown, Amelie Louise Brown, John Lewis Brown, Melior Anna (Nancy) Brown and David Brown. His second wife bore him one daughter, Mary Brown (1785–1793), who died as a child. Brown died on 13 May 1804 at Maglegård in Gentofte. He was buried at Sankt Mariæ Kirke in Vor Frue Kloster in Helsingør.
