= Egholm, Lejre Municipality =

Danish historic manor house

Egholm
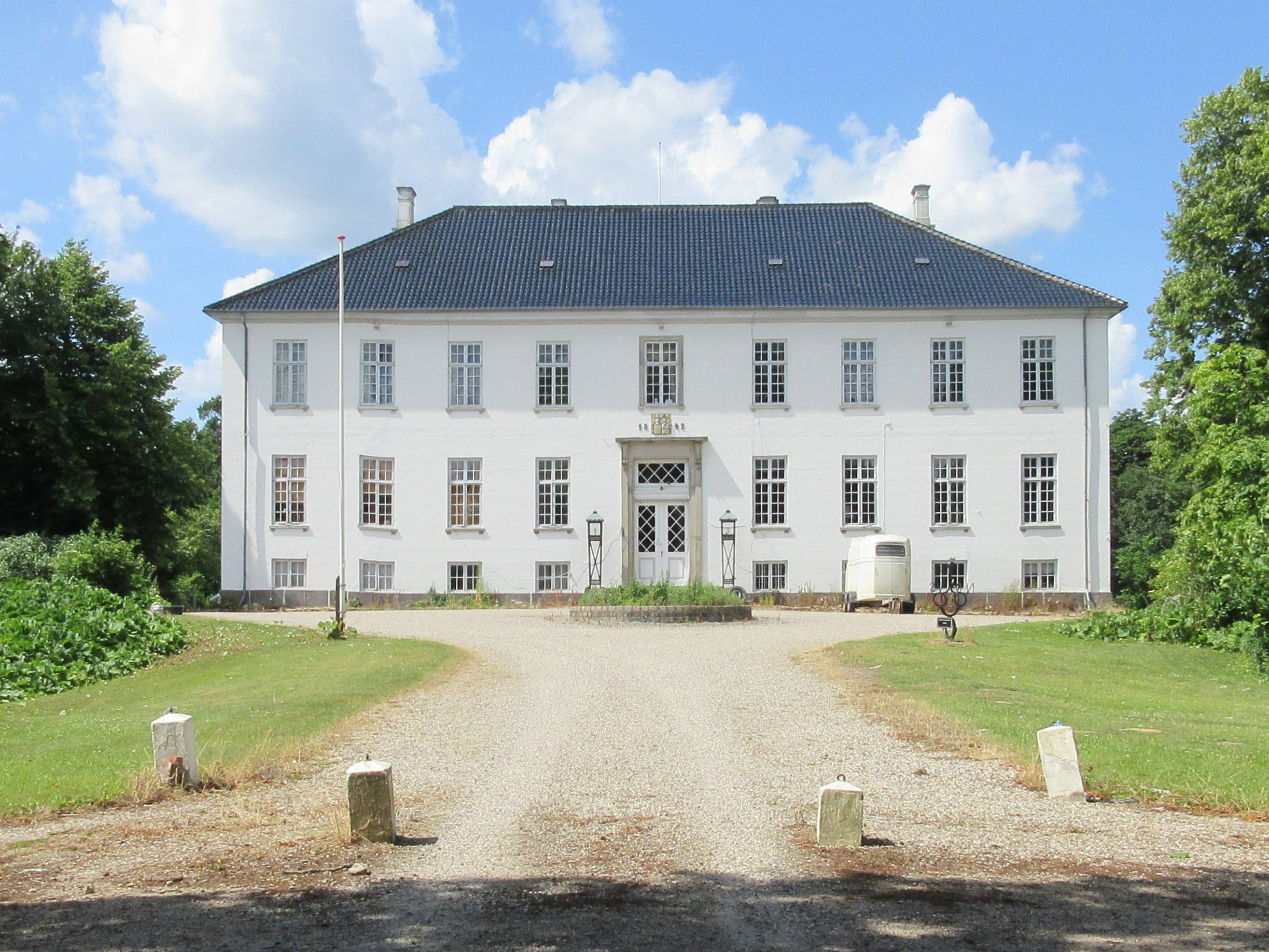
- Interactive map of the Egholm area

General information
- Architectural style: Neoclassical
- Location: Trehøjevej 45; 4070 Kirke Hyllinge, Denmark
- Coordinates: 55°45′58.42″N 11°43′44.67″E
- Completed: 1812 (main building)

Egholm is a manor house and estate situated on the Hornsherred Peninsula, between Kirke Hyllinge and Skibby, in Lejre Municipality, some 60 km west of Copenhagen, Denmark. The Neoclassical main building from 1824, a gatehouse from 1870, a barn from 1880, a stable from circa 1890 and a former horse mill were listed on the Danish registry of protected buildings and places in 1998. Another building is now operated as an arms museum under the name Egholm Museum. The estate covers 770 hectares of land.

== History ==
=== 14th century – 1640: Early history ===
Egholm traces its history back to the 13th century. Remains of a Romanesque castle is still seen at the site. It is believed that it was built for Jacob Nielsen, Count of Halland, a grandson of Valdemar II. A vaulted cellar was excavated in the 1960s.

Egholm is first mentioned in written records in 1405 when it was owned by Predbjørn Podebusk. In 1419, he passed it to his nephew Henning Podebusk til Skjern. In 1435, Henning Podebusk ceded it to the uncle's son, Claus Podebusk til Vosborg. In 1436, he passed a share in the estate to his sister, Gisele Podebusk, who was married twice, first to Hans Grubendal and then to Jens Due Thott. The latter is mentioned as the sole owner of the estate in 1460. Both Gisele Podebusk's marriages were childless.

Egholm was later ceded to the brothers Eiler and Niels Mogensen Hak, probably as an endowment by Gisele Podebusk and Jens Due, although they were not related and their relationship remains unknown. In 1484, Eiler Mogensen Hak acquired his brother's share of the estate. His widow Anne Nielsdatter became the owner of the estate after his death in 1501. Egholm was later passed on to first their son Christoffer Hak and then in 1539 their daughter Lene Krafse (née Hak). Egholm was after her death owned by members of the Krafse family for the next one hundred years.

=== 1640–1804: Rosenkrantz and Skeel families ===
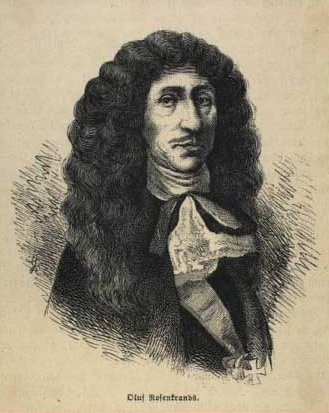
Oluf Rosenkrantz

In 1640, Otto Krafse sold the estate to Holger Rosenkrantz. Holger Rosenkrantz 'The Wealthy', was one of the most wealthy noblemen in the country. On his death in 1647, Egholm was passed on to his son Oluf Rosenkrantz. He expanded the estate through the acquisition of many new tenant farms. He later established a new manor from part of the estate, naming it Krabbesholm after his wife's family. He was created Friherre in 1671. Egholm was granted the status of a birk that same year with the effect that it became an independent jurisdiction. Rosenkrantz fell out of favour at the court after opposing the new Absolute monarchy and was forced to transfer all his estates to his daughters and sons-in-law. Egholm was ceded to Mogens Skeel til Fussingø. Oluf Rosenkrantz and his Birgitte Krabbe lived on the estate until their deaths in 1685. Rgjolm was then sold to Mogens Skeel's brother Otte Skeel til Vallø. He increased the estate through the acquisition of more land. After Skeel's death, Egholm was passed on to his daughter Birgitte Skeel and son-in-law Otto Krabbe til Holmegaard. They had no children and Egholm was therefore endowed to Iver Rosenkrantz. He was already the owner of a number of other estates.

Iver Rosenkrantz died in 1745 and his widow Charlotte Amalie Skeel then owned the estate until her death in 1763. Their son Christian Rosenkrantz once again expanded the estate with more land. He was also the owner of Krabbesholm, Ryegaard, Barritskov and Trudsholm. He endowed his estates to Niels Rosenkrantz with an obligation to establish a stamhus (family trust) from the estates. Stamhuset Rosenkrantz blev was established from Ryegaard, Barritskov and Trudsholm while Egholm and Krabbesholm were sold to his brother Marcus Gøye Rosenkrantz. He sold Egholm to count Christian Conrad Sophus Danneskiold-Samsøe and Lars Lassen just two months later. Lars Larsen became the sole owner of the estate in 1806 but sold it in 1809.

=== Changing owners, 1804–1812 ===
In 1807, Egholm was acquired by Christian Conrad Sophus Danneskiold-Samsøe.

In 1807, Egholm was acquired by Lars Lassen. He had already managed ot owned a number of other estates. In 19+0, he sold Rgholm to the army officer Harald Rothe. Back in 1806, Rothe had also bought Aggersvold.

=== 1812–1920: Haffner family ===
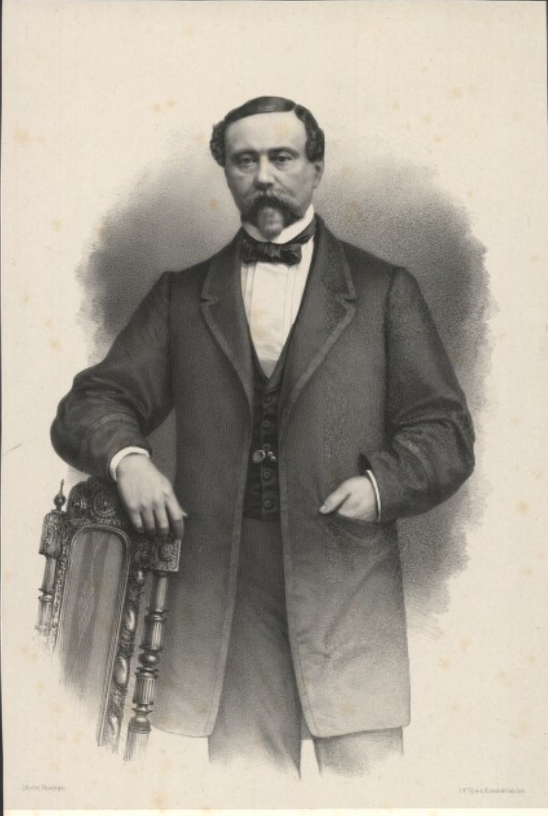
Wolfgang Haffner

Johan Wolfgang Haffner acquired Egholm in 1812. By testament, he decided that the estate should be turned into a stamhus for the Haffner family in 1831. This was done by his son Wolfgang Haffner in 1831.

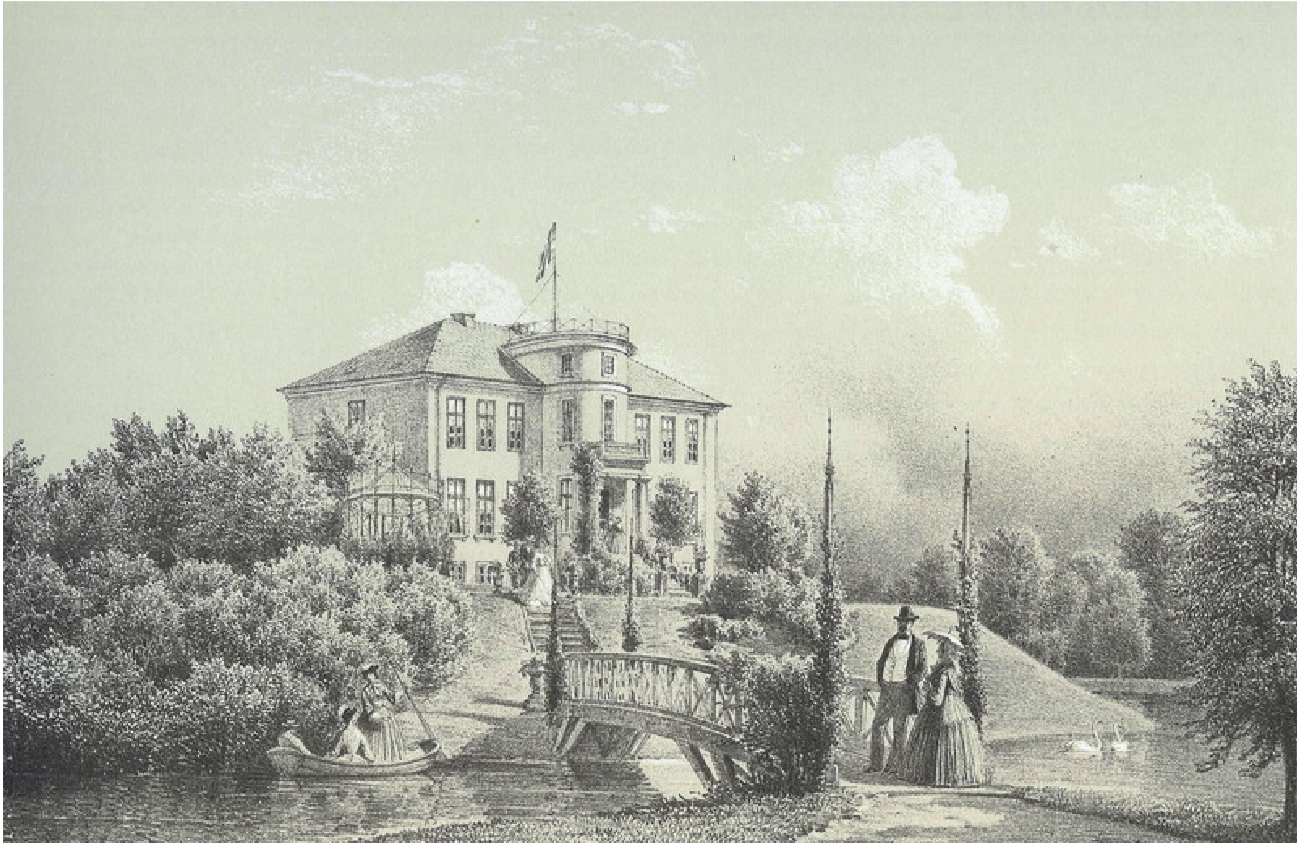
The new main building

He also constructed a new main building, expanded the forests and sold the tenant farms to the tenant farmers.

After his death in 1887, Stamhuset Egholm was passed on to his eldest daughter Amalie Haffner. On her death in 1902, it was passed on to her younger sister, Ebba Wilhelmine Haffner, who was married to a Swedish count. The next owner was her son, Erik Alfred Wolfgang Haffner Piper, a Swedish count.

=== 1920–present: Later history ===
The stamhus was dissolved as a result of the Lensafløsningsloven of 1919. The main building and park were then disjoined from the home farm (avlsgården) which was sold to the manager. The main building was sold to Axel Kaufmann. He later sold it to baroness Henny Caroline Wedell-Neergaard.

Ole Falck, a great-great-grandson of Sophus Falck, founder of Falck, purchased the main building in 1988. He later also purchased its former home farm, Egholm Møllegård and Egholm Skovgård as well as most of the land that had previously belonged to the estate.

== Architecture ==
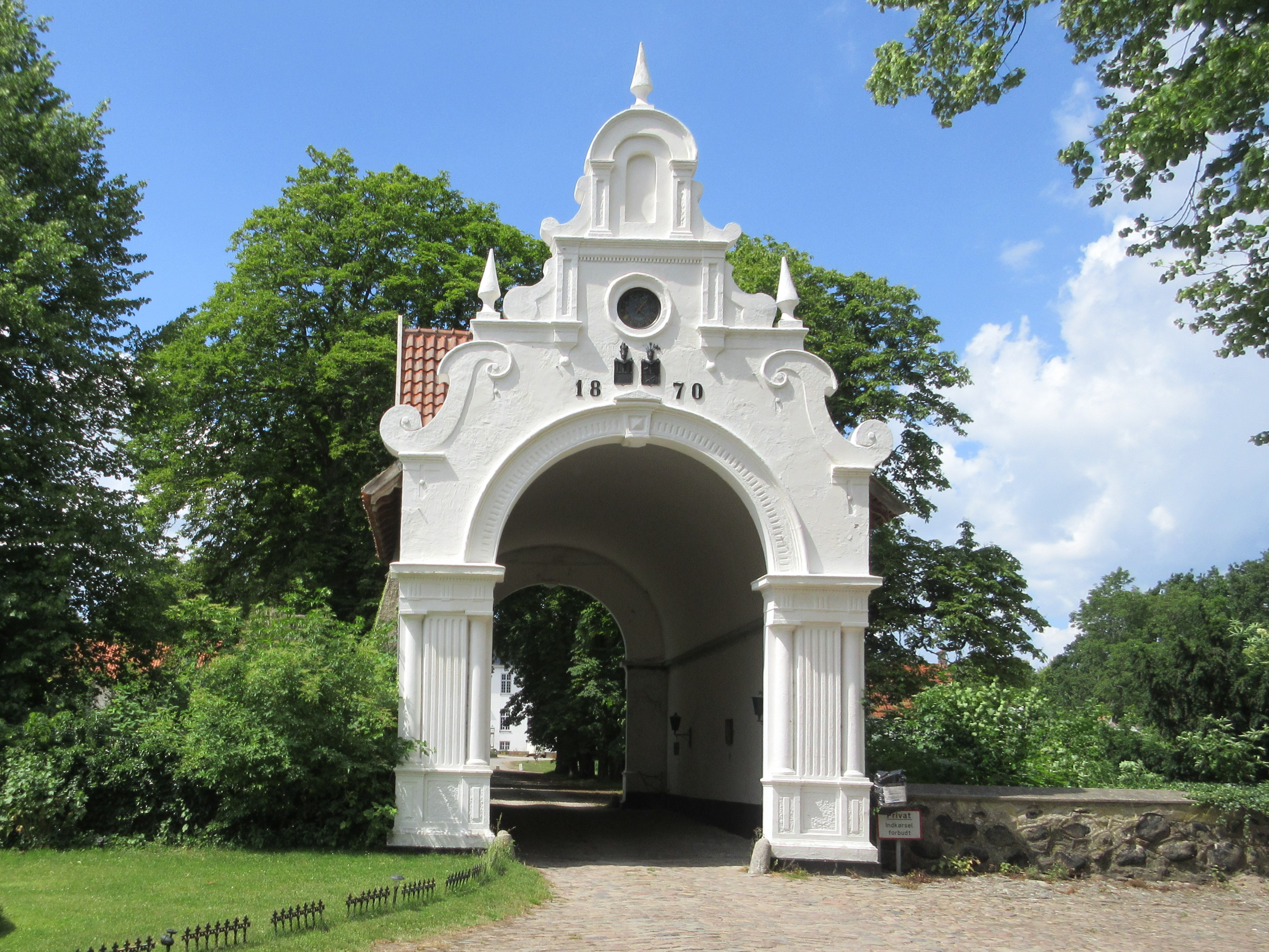
The gatehouse

The main building is designed in the Neoclassical style and is surrounded by moats. It is a simple, two-storey white-rendered building with a rounded avant-corps towards the garden. Windows and doors have sandstone framing. The building is topped by a hip roof with black-glazed tiles.

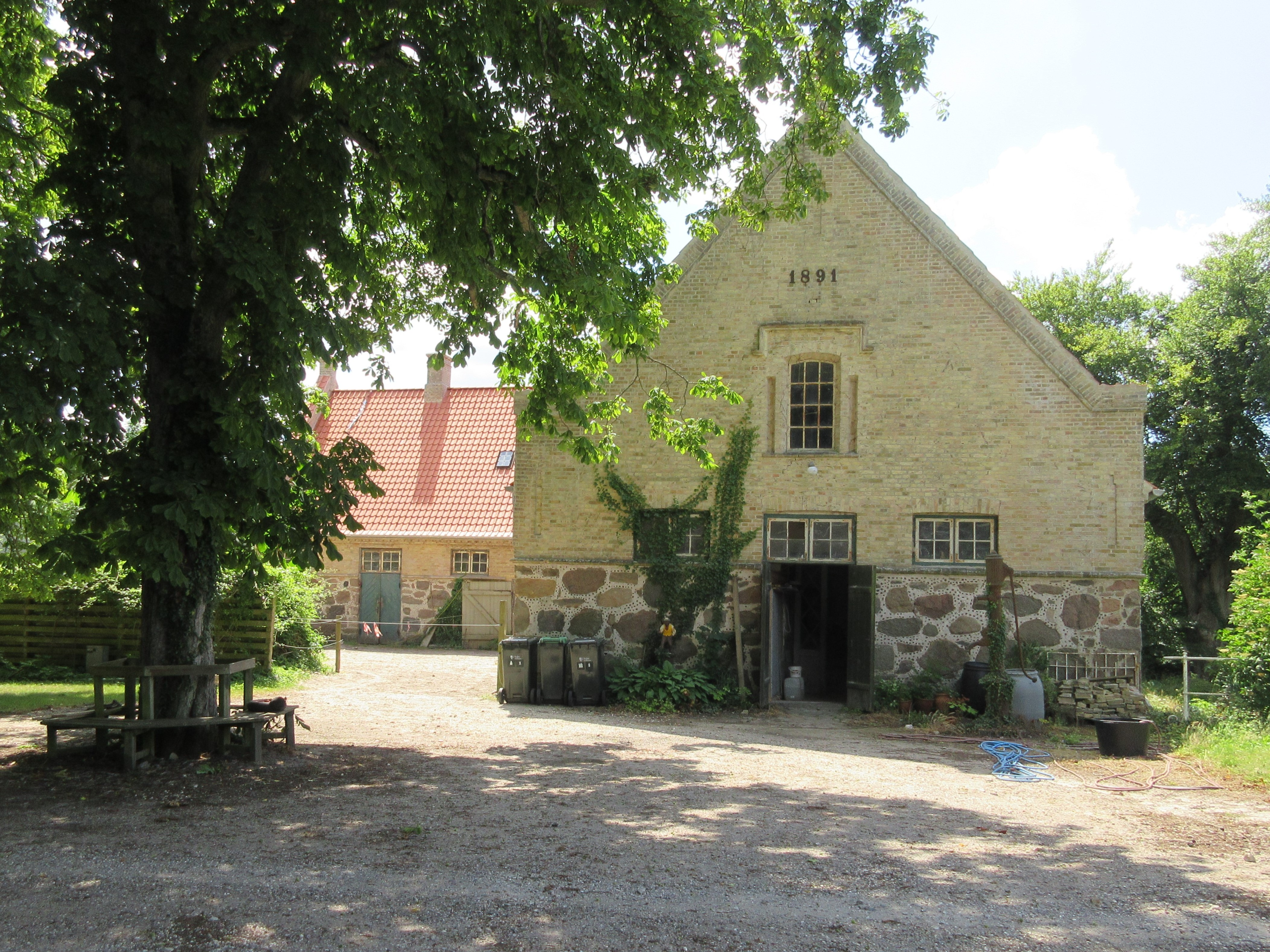
The L-shaped former stable

The main building from 1824, gatehouse from 1870, a barn from 1880, a stable from circa 1890 and a former horse mill were listed on the Danish registry of protected buildings and places in 1998.

== Surroundings ==
The estate has a total area of 570 hectares and comprises Egholm Skov. Egholm Skovgård and Egholm Møllegård are located close by. The forest contains two burial mounds from the Bronze Age. Some of the buildings are operated as an equestrian centre.

== Egholm Arms Museum ==
Egholm Museum was inaugurated in 2012 and features Ole Falck's extensive collection of firearms and accoutrements. The museum starts with a display of exhibits about Danish and German soldiers and material from the occupation of Denmark during World War II. It is followed by exhibitions about the British, Russian and American troops. The section on World War II ends with an exhibition about the Danish resistance movement. The next section of the museum is dedicated to the Wild West. Exhibits include a stagecoach, a stuffed bison, antique weapons and artifacts from that time. There is also a large collection of hunting weapons and equipment with a poacher's home and various weapons used for poaching. The museum is also home to a collection of historic arms dating back to the 17th century.

== List of owners ==
- (1405–1419) Predbjørn Podebusk
- (1419–1435) Henning Podebusk
- (1435– ) Claus Podebusk
- (1436– ) Hans Grubendal
- (1460– ) Jens Due
- ( –1484) Niels Mogensen Hak
- ( –1501) Ejler Mogensen Hak
- (1501–1534) Anne Nielsdatter Hak
- (1534v1539) Christoffer Hak
- (1539–1564) Lene Krafse née Hak
- (1564–1599) Eiler Krafse
- (1599–1602) Hilleborg Bille
- (1602–1620) Christoffer Krafse
- (1620– ) Dorte Andersdatter Krafse née Banner
- ( –1633) Otto Krafse
- (1633) Henrik Holck
- (1633–1639) Hilleborg Holck née Krafse
- (1639–1640) Otto Krafse
- (1640–1647) Holger Rosenkrantz
- (1647–1684) Oluf Rosenkrantz
- (1684–1685) Mogens Skeeliver
- (1685–1695) Otte Skeel
- (1695–1719) Otto Krabbe
- (1719–1737) Birgitte Krabbe née Skeel
- (1737–1745) Iver Rosenkrantz
- (1745–1763) Charlotte Amalie Rosenkrantz née Skeel
- (1763–1802) Frederik Christian Rosenkrantz
- (1802–1804) Niels Rosenkrantz
- (1804) Marcus Gøye Rosenkrantz
- (1804–1806) Christian Conrad Sophus Danneskiold-Samsøe
- (1804–1809) Lars Lassen
- (1809–1812) Harald Rothe
- (1809–1812) Christian Rothe
- (1812–1829) Johan Wolfgang Reinhold Haffner
- (1829–1887) Wolfgang Haffner
- (1887–1902) Amalie Langenau née von Haffner
- (1902–1914) Ebba Haffner Piper
- (1914–1920) Erik Carl Alfred Haffner Piper
- (1920–1938) Axel Otto Tage Niels Basse Kauffmann
- (1938–1954) Henny Caroline Wedell-Neergaard née Moltke
- (1954– ) Alex Christiani
- (1988– ) Dorrik Aps, v. Ole Falck

== See also ==
- Krabbesholm
