= Håvard =

Håvard or Havard is a surname and given name. Notable people with the name include:

Given name:

- Håvard Bøkko (born 1987), Norwegian speedskater
- Håvard Bjerkeli (born 1977), Norwegian cross country skier
- Håvard Flo (born 1970), football player from Norway
- Håvard Gimse (born 1966), Norwegian classical pianist from Kongsvinger
- Håvard Halvorsen (born 1973), Norwegian football defender
- Håvard Holm (1943–2017), Norwegian civil servant
- Håvard Homstvedt (born 1976), Norwegian painter
- Håvard Jørgensen, songwriter, guitarist and vocalist
- Håvard Kjærstad (born 1947), Norwegian businessperson
- Håvard Klemetsen (born 1979), Norwegian Nordic combined skier
- Håvard Lie (born 1975), retired Norwegian ski jumper
- Håvard Lothe (born 1982), Norwegian musician
- Håvard Nordtveit (born 1990), Norwegian footballer
- Håvard Rem (born 1959), Norwegian author
- Håvard Rugland (born 1984), Norwegian placekicker
- Håvard Sakariassen (born 1976), Norwegian football striker
- Håvard Solbakken (born 1973), Norwegian cross country skier
- Håvard Storbæk (born 1986), Norwegian football midfielder
- Håvard Tvedten (born 1978), Norwegian handball player
- Håvard Tveite (born 1962), Norwegian orienteering competitor
- Håvard Vad Petersson (born 1984), Norwegian curler
- Håvard Fjær Grip, Norwegian who made the first extraterrestrial helicopter flight
- Håvard Nygaard (born 1994), professional Counter-Strike 2 player

Surname:

- Dai Havard (born 1950), British Labour Party politician and Member of Parliament
- Floyd Havard (born 1965), British super-featherweight boxing champion
- Kenny Havard (born 1971), member of the Louisiana House of Representatives
- Michel Havard (born 1967), member of the National Assembly of France
- Noah Havard (born 2000), Australian canoeist
- Peter Havard-Williams (1922–1995), Welsh librarian and library educator
- René Havard (1923–1987), French film actor
- Robert Havard (1901–1985), the physician of C.S. Lewis and his wife Joy Gresham
- Valery Havard (1846–1927), career army officer, physician, author, and botanist
- William Thomas Havard MC (1889–1956), Welsh First World War military chaplain and rugby union international player
