= Niels P. Larsen =

American politician

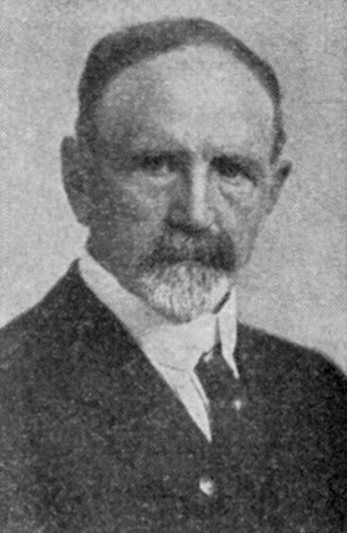

Member of the Wisconsin State Assembly
- In office 1919

Personal details
- Born: June 4, 1853 Denmark
- Party: Republican

Niels P. Larsen (born June 4, 1853; date of death unknown) was a member of the Wisconsin State Assembly.

== Biography ==
A Danish emigrant, Larsen was born on June 4, 1853. He moved with his parents to New Denmark, Wisconsin in 1861. In 1918, he moved to Denmark, Wisconsin.

== Career ==
Larsen was elected to the Assembly in 1918. He was a Republican.
