= Vicar (Anglicanism) =

Title in the Church of England

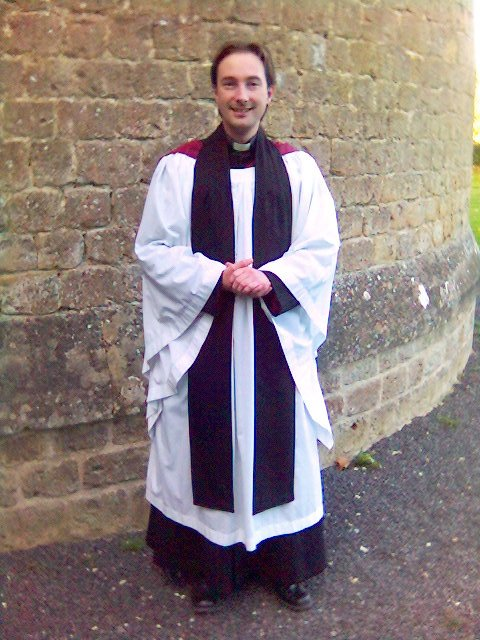
- Anglican vicar wearing choir dress

Occupation
- Names: Vicar, rector, parson
- Occupation type: Vocation
- Activity sectors: Parish ministry within the Church of England

Description
- Competencies: Spirituality, personality and character, relationships, leadership and collaboration, faith, mission and evangelism, quality of mind
- Education required: Ministerial training, typically at degree level, followed by experience as a curate
- Related jobs: Bishop, priest in charge, curate

Vicar is a title given to certain parish priests in the Church of England and other Anglican churches. It has played a significant role in Anglican church organisation in ways that are different from other Christian denominations.

The title arises from the medieval arrangement where priests were appointed either by a secular lord, by a bishop or by a religious foundation. Historically, but no longer, vicars share a benefice with a rector (often non-resident) to whom the great tithes were paid. Vicar derives from the Latin vicarius meaning a substitute.

Historically, Anglican parish priests were divided into rectors, vicars and (rarely) perpetual curates. These were distinguished according to the way in which they were appointed and remunerated. The church was supported by tithes: taxes (traditionally of ten percent) levied on the personal and agricultural output of the parish.

== Etymology ==
Parish churches in England originated as the personal property of (predominantly lay) patrons, who had the right to appoint and dismiss the parish priest, to receive an entrance fee on appointment, and to charge an annual rent thereafter. By the Gregorian reforms of the 11th century, almost all these rights were extinguished for lay patrons, who were able to retain the sole residual power to nominate the rector to a benefice, and many lay notables thereupon gave up parish churches into the ownership of religious houses, which were less inhibited by canon law from extracting fees and rents from rectors, and which could moreover petition for exemption from most such laws by papal dispensation. Around 40% of rectories in England passed into monastic possession. Initially it had not been unusual for religious houses in possession of rectories also to assume the capability to collect tithe and glebe income for themselves, but this practice was banned by the decrees of the Lateran Council of 1215. Thereafter, over the medieval period, monasteries and priories continually sought papal exemption from the Council's decrees, so as to be able to appropriate the income of rectoral benefices to their own use. However, from the 13th century onwards, English diocesan bishops successfully established the principle that only the glebe and greater tithes could be appropriated by monastic patrons in this manner; sufficient lesser tithes had to remain within the parochial benefice to ensure a competent living, the incumbent of which thenceforward carried the title of vicar. Law at the time distinguished between greater tithes, which included all things of value that come from the ground (such as grain crops, hay, and wood) and lesser tithes, which encompassed things that depended on that which arose from the ground: livestock, and the products of livestock such as eggs, milk and butter). By 1535, of 8,838 rectories in England, 3,307 had thus been appropriated with vicarages, but at this late date, a small sub-set of vicarages in monastic ownership were not being served by beneficed clergy at all. In almost all such instances, these were parish churches in the ownership of houses of Augustinian or Premonstratensian canons, orders whose rules required them to provide parochial worship within their conventual churches, for the most part as chapels of ease of a more distant parish church. From the mid-14th century onwards, the canons were able to exploit their hybrid status to justify petitions for papal privileges of appropriation, allowing them to fill vicarages in their possession either from among their own number, or from secular stipendiary priests removable at will, arrangements which corresponded to those for their chapels of ease.

Following the Dissolution of the Monasteries, the rectors and vicars of parishes formerly in monastic possession continued in post, their sources of income unaffected. Rectors received both greater and lesser tithes, vicars the lesser tithes only. Lay grantees of monastic lands also took over the monasteries' rights of nomination to monastic rectories. For monastic vicarages, the right to the greater tithes and to nominate a vicar also generally passed into the hands of lay owners, known as impropriators. Perpetual curates were appointed to the unbeneficed parishes and chapels of ease formerly in the possession of the canons. These received no tithe income, and originally impropriators were required to provide a fixed stipend, although generally the function of paymaster was eventually taken over by the diocese. If, in later years, a newly created parish was carved out of a larger rectoral or vicarial parish, the incumbent would be legally a perpetual curate, but would commonly be styled "vicar" in common use.

=== Great and small tithes ===
In legislation, the Act for the True Payment of Tithes of 1548, the great tithes are described as those of corn (that is all cereal crops), hay and wood, and the small tithes as the remainder. All such tithes were originally paid in kind. Each instance of appropriation, however, was established for an individual parish, and so there was wide local variation. Vicarial (small) tithe frequently included hay and wood; rectoral (great) tithe sometimes included wool (especially in rich wool-producing areas) as well as corn. Otherwise the main components of the small tithe, apart from wool, were milk, eggs, dairy produce and the young of animals raised as food: lambs, piglets, calves, goslings. Since animal young rarely arrived in exact multiples of ten, local custom commonly established cash adjustments to round the tithe value up or down. All or part of the tithed items might have been commuted by local custom to a fixed cash payment which, following the inflation of the 16th century, reduced commuted tithes to a fraction of their former value. By the 17th century, many such vicarages had become so poor that there was no prospect of filling them; the parish might find their cure of souls effectively annexed in plurality to a neighbouring vicarage or rectory, the parishioners consequently being offered at best infrequent opportunities for worship at their own parish church.

== Act of Parliament ==
An Act of Parliament of 1868 permitted perpetual curates to style themselves vicars and the term parson rapidly lost popularity. The conjunction of this change with near-contemporaneous church reforms aimed at reducing the disparities of income among clergy meant that the distinction between the grades of clergy became progressively less relevant and remarked upon. Popularly, any member of the clergy is often referred to as a vicar, even when they do not legally hold such a post. In the past a similar situation led to all clergy being popularly referred to as parsons.

== Parishes in England and Wales ==
Most parishes in England and Wales retain the historical title for their parish priest—rector or vicar—with vicar being more common in the urban areas, because of an expansion of new parishes being created in the Victorian years, and the incumbents being styled 'vicar' after 1868. The distinction between the titles is now only historical.

In Wales prior to Disestablishment, most parishes in the southern dioceses (St. Davids and Llandaff) were vicarages subject to lay patronage, whereas in the north rectors predominated, largely nominated by the bishops of Bangor and St Asaph.

In the late 20th century, a shortage of clergy and the disparity of workload between parish clergy led to the development of a number of new forms of parish ministry.

=== Team rectors and team vicars ===
One of these new forms, which has proved relatively effective, is the team ministry or benefice. Under this arrangement, a number of parishes conjoin to form a team, in which each parish retains its legal definition and independence. Rather than having clergy licensed to the individual parishes, a team of clergy are licensed to the entire benefice. Alternatively, a large parish, with daughter churches in addition to a parish church, may be created as a team ministry.

In these examples, one incumbent-level priest is regarded as "first among equals", takes the title team rector and serves as parish priest in one or more parishes (often the larger), while one or more priests of incumbent status, who may or may not be stipendiary, serve as team vicars. Team vicars are often installed into other parishes within the team. Other clergy—perhaps part time stipendiary or non-stipendiary—and those in training positions are formally assistant curates and are often known as team curate or, for instance, associate priest.

Until the introduction of Common Tenure, team rectors and team vicars were not appointed as perpetual parish priests, and as such did not possess the freehold but were licensed for a fixed term, known as leasehold, usually seven years for a team rector, and five years for a team vicar. With the introduction of Common Tenure most parochial clergy have similar terms of appointment and there is less distinction in terms of "employment" rights between Team clergy and other incumbents than hitherto.

== Other Anglican provinces ==
In many other Anglican Communion provinces, the distinction between a vicar and a rector is different. In the Church of Ireland and the Scottish Episcopal Church, most parish priests are rectors. In the Episcopal Church in the United States of America, a vicar is a priest in charge of a mission, a congregation supported by its diocese instead of being a self-sustaining parish headed by a rector.

== Ulster ==
In early 17th-century Ulster every church had a vicar and a parson instead of a co-arb and an erenagh. The vicar, like the co-arb, was always in orders. He said the mass ('serveth the cure') and received a share of the tithes. The parson, like the erenagh, had a major portion of the tithes, maintained the church and provided hospitality.

As he was not usually in clerical orders, his responsibilities were mainly temporal. However, there were differences in the divisions of the tithes between various dioceses in Tyrone. In the Diocese of Clogher, the vicar and the parson shared the tithes equally between them; in the Diocese of Derry, church income came from both tithes and the rental of church lands ('temporalities'). The vicar and the parson each received one third of the tithes and paid an annual tribute to the bishop.

In places where there was no parson, the erenagh continued to receive two thirds of the income in kind from the church lands, and delivered the balance, after defraying maintenance, to the bishop in cash as a yearly rental. In other places, the parson, the vicar and the erenagh shared the costs of church repairs equally between them. In the Diocese of Armagh the parson received two-thirds of the tithes and the vicar one third. The archbishop and the erenagh impropriated no part thereof, presumably because they received the entire income from the termon lands. The division of responsibilities between vicar and parson seems to derive from a much earlier precedent established in the old Celtic Church of St Columcille.

== Cultural associations ==
The image of the parish vicar is a popular one in British culture. A popular British television series on BBC depicts a fictional woman vicar humorously in The Vicar of Dibley, and the story of The Vicar of Bray appears as a song and otherwise. Rev., another popular sitcom on BBC Two, explores the struggles of a former rural vicar as he copes with the demands of running an inner-city church. The Vicar is a character in the comedy Keeping Up Appearances.

== See also ==
- Anglican ministry
- Church of England § Structure
