= Farm Workers Union of Uppland =

Trade union in Sweden

ULF
- Farm Workers' Union of Uppland
- Upplands lantarbetareförbund
- Merged into: Farm Workers Union of Sweden
- Founded: 1 December 1918
- Dissolved: 1 January 1930
- Location: Sweden
- Key people: Oscar Sjölander (Chairman), A. E. Elmroth (Chairman).

The Farm Workers Union of Uppland (Swedish: Upplands lantarbetareförbund, abbreviated ULF) was a trade union for agricultural workers in Uppland, Sweden. ULF was founded on 1 December 1918. The union was active parallel to the Farm Workers Union of Sweden (SLF). In 1919, SLF and the Swedish Trade Union Confederation (LO) begin pressuring ULF to merge with SLF, which finally came about in 1930.

The existence of an independent union of agricultural labourers in Uppland could partly be explained by the fact that living conditions for statare were worse in Uppland than in other regions of the country. The Uppland plains north of Mälaren were completely dominated by estates of large landowners. During the early 1920s, Uppland had the highest percentage of union organizing amongst agricultural labourers in Sweden.

== History ==
=== Sjölander, the agitator ===
The ULF leader was Oscar Sjölander, a teacher in Kungsängen and a member of parliament of the Social Democratic Labour Party. He had conducted agitations and farm worker organizing in the area from 1914 and onwards. He founded three labour communes in southern Uppland (Bro, Lossa and Kungsängen). He sought assistance from the national headquarters of the Social Democratic Labour Party, LO and SLF for his organizing endeavours in southern Uppland; but received no help from neither of them. LO was reluctant to support an organizing drive in the predominantly rural Uppland, preferring to give assistance to organizing of agricultural workers in areas surrounding major industrial centres. Sjölander spent six weeks of his summer holidays in 1918, agitating amongst agricultural labourers. As a result, the Bro Härad Farm Workers Trade Union was founded. Bro Härad would remain the key stronghold of ULF throughout its existence. The union was reorganized as ULF at its second meeting held December 1918.

=== Relations to SLF ===
The initial intent of ULF might have been to join SLF, but differences over tactics during a major ULF harvest strike in the summer of 1919 closed the space for unification between ULF and SLF. The SLF leadership, in particular its chairman Albin Hansson, was more cautious regarding strike tactics than ULF.

ULF was met with criticism not only from the estate owners but also from the Social Democratic press, SLF and the Swedish Trade Union Confederation (LO). The only press outlet that defended ULF was the Social Democratic newspaper Uplands Folkblad (partially financed by ULF).

=== 1919 harvest strike ===
In April 1919 ULF had demanded a 30% raise of wages for farm workers. The demand was rejected by the regional employers organization. At a meeting in Kungsängen on 4 May, delegates of the ULF branches called for militant actions against the estate owners. Sjölander did however caution the delegates, arguing that the newly founded union lacked the financial means to mobilize a prolonged strike. He drafted a proposal for a new treaty, calling for raising the salary to 1000 Swedish krona. The employers did however decline negotiation with ULF between May and July 1918.

Spontaneous strikes broke out amongst farm workers in Veckholm and Ekerö, without the approval of ULF. Following the start of the Veckholm strike, Sjölander offer to discuss modifications to the draft treaty with the employers, but the employers again declined to negotiate with him. A ULF conference was assembled, and decided to initiate a strike starting 29 July 1919. Non-socialist newspapers decried the demands of ULF. For example, Dagens Nyheter claimed that 'Bolshevik tendencies' could be found amongst the farm labourers. During the strike actions were coordinated between ULF and SLF branches in nearby areas (in spite of resistance from the national SLF leadership), paving the way for workers' victory in the dispute. The strike lasted for a week. The estate owners were unable to recruit scabs to save the harvest, and thus no violent incidents occurred at the picket lines. Under pressure from the public opinion (as voiced through Stockholm newspapers), wary of food shortages as a result of the strike, the national government instituted a negotiating commission. The Uppland estate owners association caved in to pressure from the government commission, and eventually accepted raising the salary of a körkarl from around 600 krona to 900 krona. ULF on its part had been forced to accept the continuation of individual employment contracts.

At the time of the 1919 strike, ULF had around 4,000 members (out of a total of around 20,000 farm workers in Uppland). Another 2,000 organized farm workers also took part in the strike. ULF membership began to decline after the strike, as many labourers felt union membership was superfluous as their demands had already been met.

=== December 1919 conference ===
ULF held a conference in Uppsala on 7 December 1919. The national LO leadership was represented at the conference (including Arvid Thorberg) as well the leftwing socialist-dominated SLF districts of Närke and Södermanland and the dissident farm workers union in Västmanland-Dalarna (Forest and Farm Workers Union of Central Sweden). At the conference a 'Cooperation Committee' of farm workers was formed, with representatives from Uppland, Sörmland, Närke, Dalarna and Västmanland. Criticism from LO and the Social Democratic Party against ULF was stepped up following the December 1919 conference. Sharp attacks against Sjölander's reluctance to merge with SLF were published in Social-Demokraten. The decision to form a Cooperation Committee parallel to SLF and with participation of SLF branches was lambasted as a move to divide the farm workers movement.

The Cooperation Committee organized a national farm workers' conference in Stockholm on 29 February 1920. Apart from the 157 delegates of the constituent organizations there were also two delegates from Östergötland present. The national SLF leadership also reluctantly participated, in order to argue against the proposals of Sjölander. The conference proposed instituting a tripartite commission (consisting of SLF, ULF and the Forest and Farm Workers Union of Central Sweden) to oversee a merger of the different unions. The key debate at the conference was the issue of tactics. Sjölander's position prevailed (with 77 votes against 11), calling for the abolition of local bargaining agreements. The tripartite commission never became effective.

=== Strikes of 1924 and 1925 ===
ULF did not participate in the 1924 strike mobilized by SLF. However, in 1925 ULF organized a major harvest strike of its own, with epicentre in Kungsängen. Sjölander emerged as the main leader of the strike. But whilst Sjölander had urged his followers to desist from violence, clashes erupted between striking labourers and scabs (brought in from Stockholm). In Bro scabs were forced to flee head over heels, in fights that resulted in jail terms for striking labourers. The outcome of the strike eventually resulted in a backlash for ULF and Sjölander, was they were unable to achieve a favourable bargaining deal. The 1925 strike figures in several literary works, such as the novel En natt i juli by Jan Fridegård and the novel collection Statarna by Ivar Lo-Johansson. En natt i juli was made into a movie in 1946, titled När ängarna blomma.

=== Unification ===
Sjölander died in 1928. A. E. Elmroth became the new ULF chairman. Sjölander's nemesis in the farm workers movement, Hansson, died in 1929. After the passing of Sjölander and Hansson, venues for reconciliation between ULF and SLF were opened. ULF merged into SLF on 1 January 1930. As of 1929 ULF had 2,236 members (as compared to 6,678 members in SLF).

== Organization ==
=== Geographic scope ===
ULF sections were generally found in parishes with large land estates. As of 1920 ULF claimed to have organizers in Gimo, Trögd, Lidingö, Rimbo, Ekerö, Munsö and at the border with Västmanland. The key areas of ULF activities were located just north of Mälaren, Bro, Håbo, Trögd and Åsunda. On the islands in Mälaren (such as Adelsö, Munsö, Ekerö, Svartsjölandet and Lovö) ULF had a fairly strong presence. The organization also had a well-organized following in the Baltic Sea archipelago, several branches were established on Värmdö.

ULF branches were also found of the southern shore of Mälaren, in northern and western Salem, Västertälje, Botkyrka, Huddinge and Brännkyrka. In 1921 ULF expanded its scope of activity to Södertörn (since the estate owners of Södertörn were already organized in the Uppland regional organization), with nine branches joining the organization. Fierce competition over influence in Södertörn erupted between SLF and ULF, but ULF eventually established itself as the dominant force there (as of 1930 ULF had branches in all parishes of Södertörn except Vårdinge).

In the Uppsala plains, Bondkyrka had the strongest ULF section (with 72 members in 1925). The section was active in nine parishes. In eastern Uppland, ULF organizing met with stiff resistance. The company Gimo-Österbruk AB owned large shares of the lands there.

The weakest point of ULF in Uppland was Roslagen, the plains around Rimbo and Norrtälje. The organization was somewhat stronger in the northernmost parts of the county, in plains around Tierp and Forsmark.

In Stockholms län, there were 28 parishes (out of a total of 97) were ULF (probably) never had any organizational presence between 1918 and 1929. In Uppsala län, 14 out of 85 parishes had seemingly been untouched by ULF organizing. In Stockholms län 13 section of ULF were closed down prior to 1925, and in Uppsala län seven ULF sections had been disbanded prior to 1925.

=== Publication ===
ULF published the fortnightly newspaper Skogs och lantarbetet between 1921 and 1929. Sjölander served as its editor, and was a prolific contributor to the newspaper.

=== Educational and cultural activism ===
ULF worked closely together with the Workers Educational Association (ABF), setting up mobile libraries for agricultural labourers at farms in the country-side.
