= Forest and Farm Workers Union of Sweden =

Trade union in Sweden

Forest Farm Workers Union of Sweden
- Sveriges skogs- och lantarbetareförbund
- Founded: 1921
- Dissolved: 1922
- Location: Sweden
- Key people: Artur Bergvall (chairman), Axel Friberg (treasurer), Sven G. Lorén
- Affiliations: Red International of Labour Unions

The Forest and Farm Workers Union of Sweden (Swedish: Sveriges skogs- och lantarbetareförbund) was a revolutionary trade union for forestry and agricultural workers in Sweden. The union was founded in 1921. The union had its main base in Dalarna, but also had local sections in Södermanland, Västergötland and scattered locations across central Sweden.

== History ==
=== Political division in the farm workers movement ===
The union was founded in response to an anti-communist purge in the Farm Workers Union of Sweden following its March 1921 congress in Norrköping. Around the country, district conferences of the Farm Workers Union of Sweden were held in which communists were removed from leadership positions in the union. The communists issued a call for the foundation of a new nationwide agricultural labourers' union. The invitation to the founding congress of the Forest and Farm Workers Union of Sweden was sent to all sections of the Farm Workers Union of Sweden. The appeal cited the rejection of the declarations of the Norrköping congress by many of its attending delegates (including the leadership of the Forest and Farm Workers Union of Central Sweden). However, the Forest and Farm Workers Union of Central Sweden had split shortly after the Norrköping congress. The majority of the organization (the sections in Västmanland) had rejoined the Farm Workers Union of Sweden. The rump Forest and Farm Workers Union of Central Sweden (consisting of the Dalarna district organization and a few other section) would serve as the basis of the new nationwide union.

=== Stockholm congress ===
The founding congress of the new union was held May 24–25, 1921. A resolution declaring steadfast support for the Red International of Labour Unions was adopted. The congress also adopted bylaws which were in accordance with the Trade Union Propaganda League. Artur Bergvall was elected chairman and Axel Friberg treasurer. Sven G. Lorén (editor of Den svenske lantarbetaren, 'The Swedish Farm Worker') was also included in the leadership of the organization. The congress was attended by 45 delegates, representing 43 local sections from different parts of the country.

=== Disbanding ===
The new union would have a short period of existence, lasting only a few months. The union was hit hard by the economic crisis. Sections in Dalarna began deserting to the Farm Workers Union of Sweden. Publication of Den svenske lantarbetaren was discontinued. In 1922 the union merged with the (communist-led) Åboförbundet, forming Sverges allmogeförbund. A possible merger with the Central Organization of the Workers of Sweden (SAC) had also been discussed.

== Organization ==
=== Political profile ===
The union defined itself as a revolutionary organization. It advocated an agrarian reform on the same lines as the one implemented in Soviet Russia, as a solution to the unemployment crisis in Sweden. The organization argued that labour unions should actively engage in political struggles. However, in reality, the union wasn't able to conduct much political agitation. It was bogged down in economic issues, in particular a strike in Dalarna (that had been initiated by the Forest and Farm Workers Union of Central Sweden against reduction of wages).

=== International affiliation ===
A delegation representing the national leadership of the union participated in the founding congress of the Red International of Labour Unions in the summer of 1921. The delegation also visited the Soviet farm workers union.

== See also ==
- Farm Workers Union of Småland
