= Christian Jacobsen Drakenberg =

Norwegian sailor

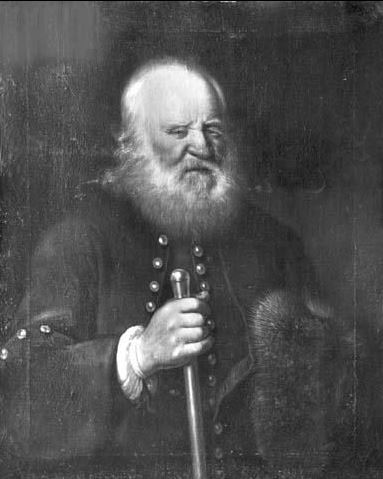
- Born: 18 November 1626 (disputed); Blomsholm, Norway
- Died: 9 October 1772; Aarhus, Denmark
- Occupation: Sailor

Christian Jacobsen Drakenberg (18 November 1626 (disputed) – 9 October 1772) was a Norwegian sailor who, according to his information, was born in 1626 in Blomsholm, Norway and thus reached the age of 145. The claims have since proven implausible, but at the time it was widely accepted and contributed to his considerable fame. Drakenberg led a colorful life as a sailor; he traveled much in Europe and Asia, was held captive by pirates on several occasions, and fought in 3 wars under different Danish kings. He retired at the claimed age of 86, and in light of his impressive story he was awarded a yearly pension by the Danish king. Drakenberg spent the last years of his life living with beneficiaries and friends until his death in 1772 in Aarhus, Denmark.

The most important source for Drakenberg's life is the publication "Den ældgamle Normand, Christian Jacobsen Drakenbergs, Levnets-Beskrivelse; Tilligemed den over ham holdte Liigprædiken, og hans Portrait" (English: The ancient Norwegian, Christian Jacobsen Drakenbergs, life description; In addition the funeral sermon held and his portrait) by a tenant named Mønster on the manor Allinggård from 1774. The publication is based on Drakenberg's own memories, which he had written down when he lived at the manor in the 1750s. Mønster also added information about conversations he had with Drakenberg and a number of second-hand accounts.

== Claims ==
Drakenberg claimed to have been born in 1626, in Blomsholm, Norway and that he was baptized by the priest Peder Johansen Wynsten. In 1732, Drakenberg travelled to Norway and obtained a document from the parish register to prove his claim. He returned with the documents and it was accepted at the time. However, no evidence of the priest that originally baptised him, the priest who gave him the documents in 1732 and his parents has been found. Incidentally, parish registers did not become mandatory by law in Norway until 1683. Although the evidence appears spurious, at the time few doubted Drakenberg's claims and his age of 145 was noted in both the parish register and the probate and he garnered some fame in his time. Some historians have since pinned his most likely birth date to around 1665–1670, making Drakenberg about 100 years old when he died, although no conclusive evidence has been found.

It is known that Drakenberg was from Norway, was a sailor, that he received a pension by the king of Denmark in 1735 and that he married two years later. His life before he met count Frederik Danneskjold-Samsøe is sparsely documented but more information becomes available in the time after he settled in Jutland.

== Life ==
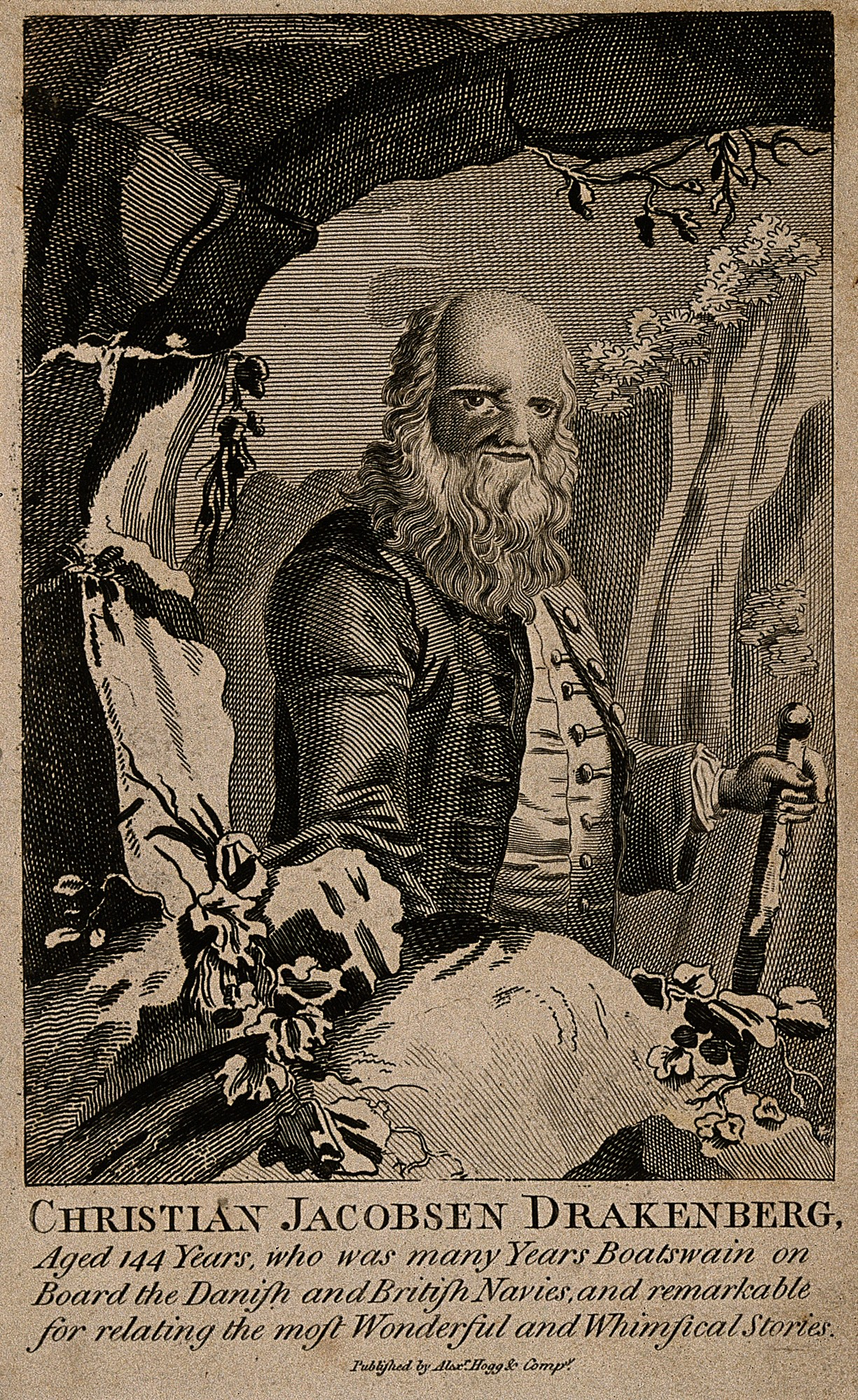
Engraving of Drakenberg when he was, allegedly, 144

According to documents presented by Drakenberg he was born in Skee in Bohuslän, which until 1658 belonged to Norway. His father was Jacob Drakenberg, a ship's captain, and his mother was Margrethe Lisbeth Juul. When he was 8 years old, he was sent to his uncle Bernt Drakenberg in Holland but five years later he took hire on a ship and left home. In the following years, he traveled between England, Spain, Norway, Greenland and in the Baltic Sea. In 1657, Drakenberg arrived in Kristiania as the Second Northern War was starting and he enlisted in the Danish Navy under Frederik III. In 1660, after the war, Drakenberg was hired as a quartermaster on Holmen Naval Base in Copenhagen.

In 1664, Drakenberg took a new job on board a Norwegian ship, then a Portuguese and an English ship. During this period he traveled further and longer; Western India, Brazil and Malta. In 1671, he was captured by pirates for the first time but quickly got free. In 1675, the Scanian War started and Drakenberg enlisted in the navy under Christian V. He remained in the navy for 6 years before he took a job on a trade vessel. In the following years, he worked on a number of different ships and traded in Arkhangelsk and the Mediterranean. During a voyage to Spain in 1694, he was caught by Algerian pirates who sold him to a Turk in Tripoli, who sold him on to a plantation owner on Cyprus who finally sold him to a wealthy Jew in Aleppo.

On 15 May 1710, 15 years and 3 months after his capture, Drakenberg managed to escape to Malta in a dinghy at the age of 83. He made his way through Italy and France when news of the beginning of the Great Northern War reached him. Drakenberg traveled home to Norway and enlisted in Frederik IV's navy in 1712. It was at this time then he met Peter Wessel and in a street altercation threw Wessel's rapier over a roof, humiliating the naval hero. Drakenberg was initially jailed for the incident but eventually released without consequence. Drakenberg retired in 1717 due to failing eyesight after 5 years of service. In the following years he spent time in different places, staying with former friends, colleagues and military comrades. In 1722, he settled in Nørrejylland for 6 years, living with the widowed officers-wife of one of his friends.

In 1728, Drakenberg's hostess introduced him to the Count Frederik Danneskjold-Samsøe and an unusual friendship started. Drakenberg soon moved in with Danneskjold-Samsøe at Engelsholm and the two lived there until 1733 when they moved to Copenhagen where on 21 September 1735, Drakenberg was introduced to King Christian VI at Fredensborg. Drakenberg told the king of both his unusual age and military service under 3 of the king's predecessors and in return Drakenberg was given a lifelong pension by the king.

In 1737, Drakenberg was engaged and then married to the 60 year old widow Maren Michelsdatter Bagge. The engagement was celebrated in Aarhus and the wedding in Copenhagen in Danneskjold-Samsøe's house on Kongens Nytorv. Unfortunately the marriage did not last long as Drakenberg's wife died after a few years. Drakenberg lived the next 20 years as a nomad moving from friend to friend, sometimes staying for years. He never stopped looking for a new wife and did propose one more time but he remained alone. Drakenberg moved to Aarhus in 1760 and rented a room in Fiskergade where he lived for the rest of his life. Danneskjold-Samsøe continued supporting him financially as his health declined and until his death and funeral. Drakenberg died on 9 October 1772.

After his death Drakenberg's body was placed in a chapel in Aarhus Cathedral where it essentially mummified and until 1840 it was on permanent display in the church. It has since been moved and its whereabouts are unknown.

== Legacy ==
Drakenberg was famous in his time and left behind many portraits and depictions including one by Johann Salomon Wahl from 1736 (in Frederiksborg Museum), one by Carl Gustav Pilo from 1741 and one by Mogens Thrane from 1758.. Years after his death he kept fascinating people. In Aarhus, the grocer Sophus E. Johnsen (1869-1950) became deeply interested in Drakenberg's life and exploits. He named his own house Drakenberghus and he erected a memorial plaque on Drakenberg's house in Fiskergade. He operated a small Drakenberg museum, published the Drakenberg Paper and established the Drakenberg award, awarded to among others Winston Churchill and Vera Lynn. In addition he had an article about Drakenberg from 1774 reprinted and translated to Swedish, English, German and Dutch.

Johnsen claimed to have made a number of plaster busts of Drakenberg's corpse although no documents to that effect have been found. However, since a search of the church crypt in 1998 did not turn up Drakenberg's body it is possible Johnson somehow managed to steal it. Scientists from the center for Gerontology at Aarhus University initially searched for the body but eventually turned to finding the plaster busts instead. In February 1999 one bust was found in Swedish Strömstads Museum. Studies have revealed the bust likely was made from a deceased person but it has not been possible to prove it is, in fact, Drakenberg. Danish author Morten Leth Jacobsen has written a historical novel about Drakenberg's life.

== Gallery ==
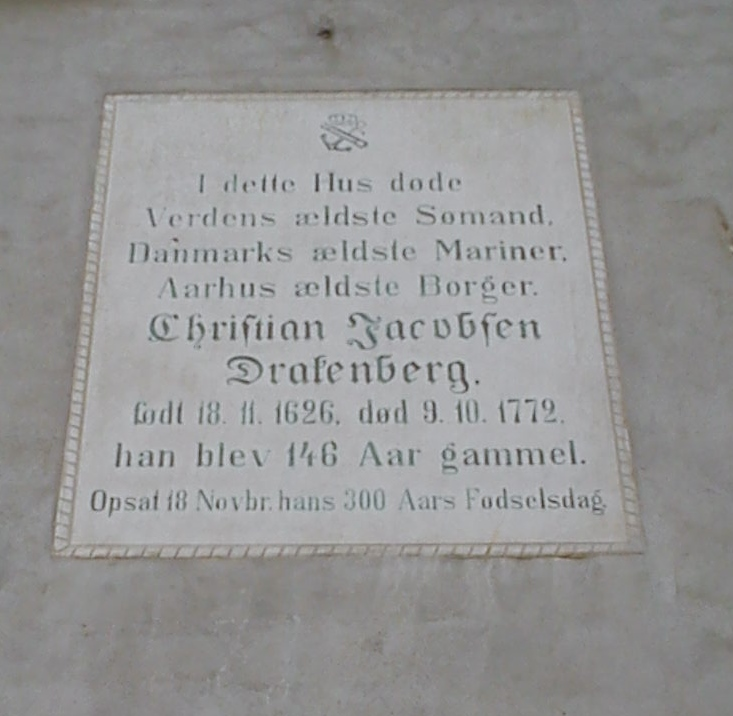
Text on Drakenberg's house in Aarhus

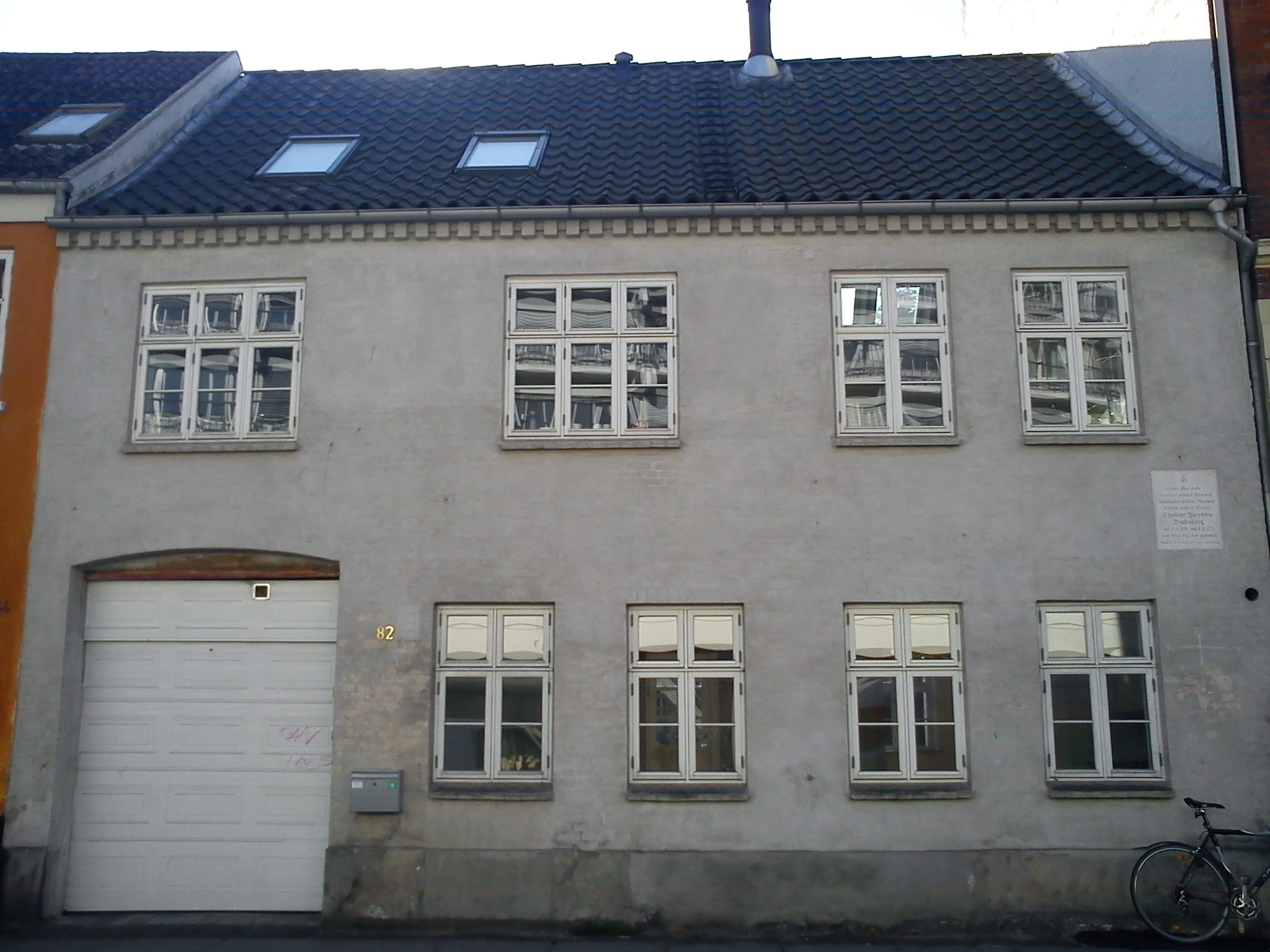
Drakenberg's house.

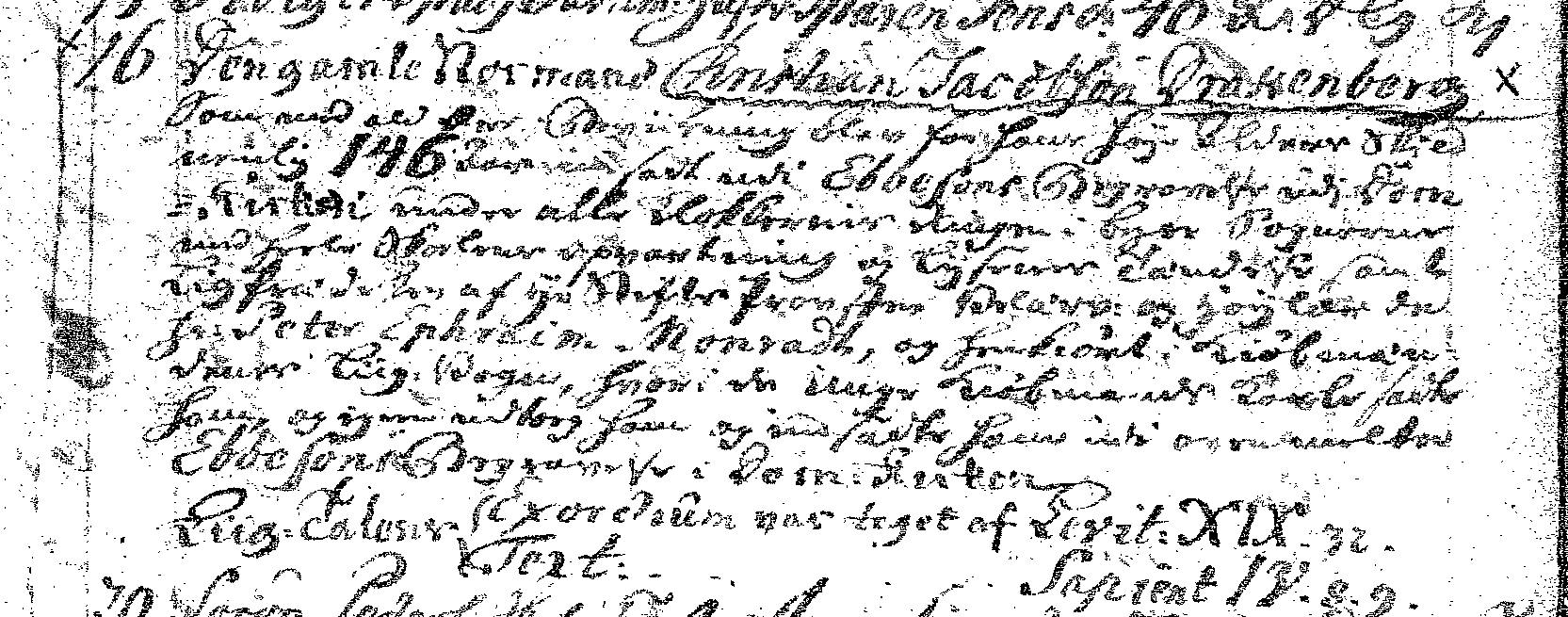
Drakenbergs funeral 16 October 1772, noted in the parish register of Aarhus Cathedral.

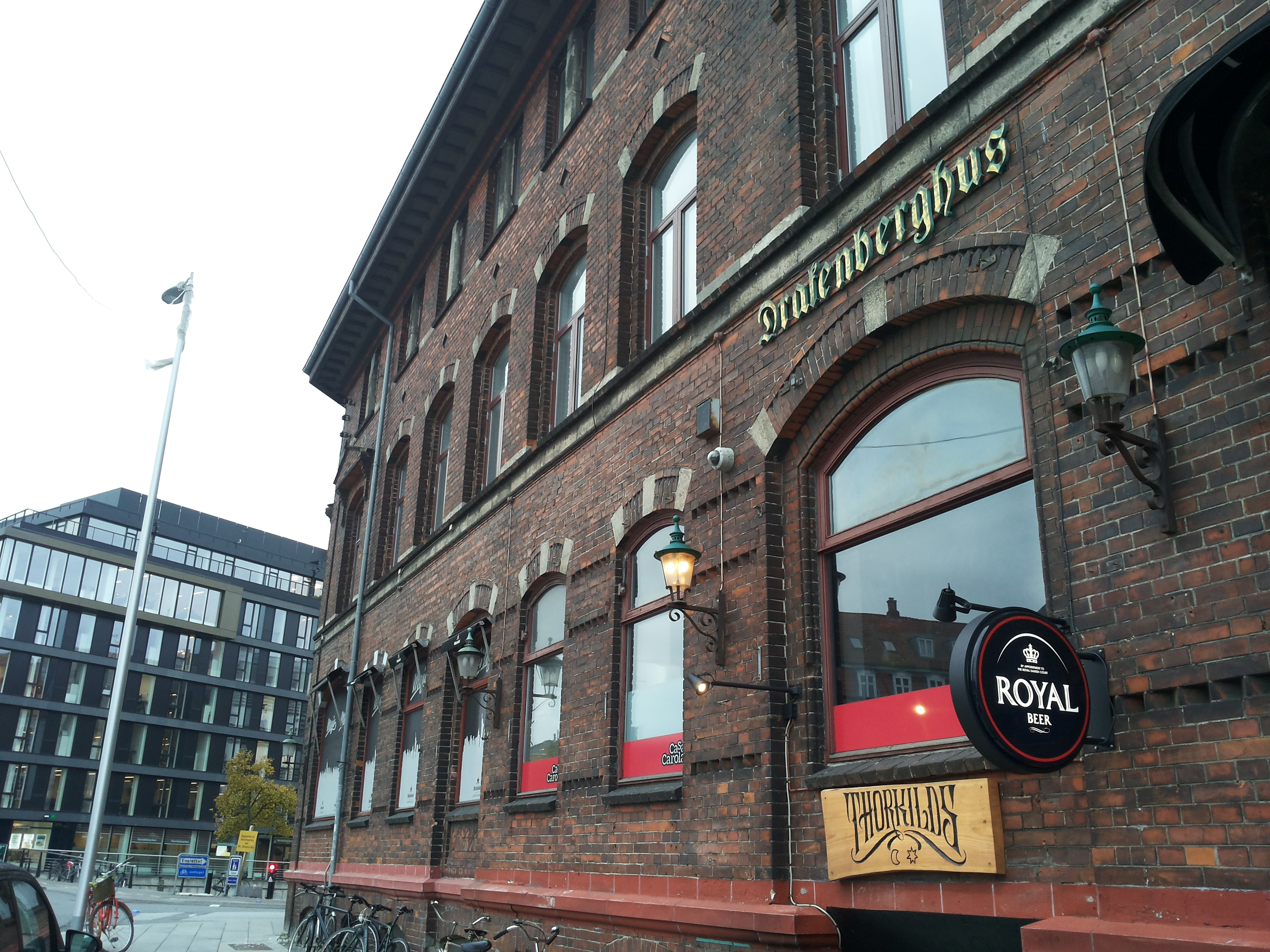
Johnsen's house Drakenberghus on Mindebrograde

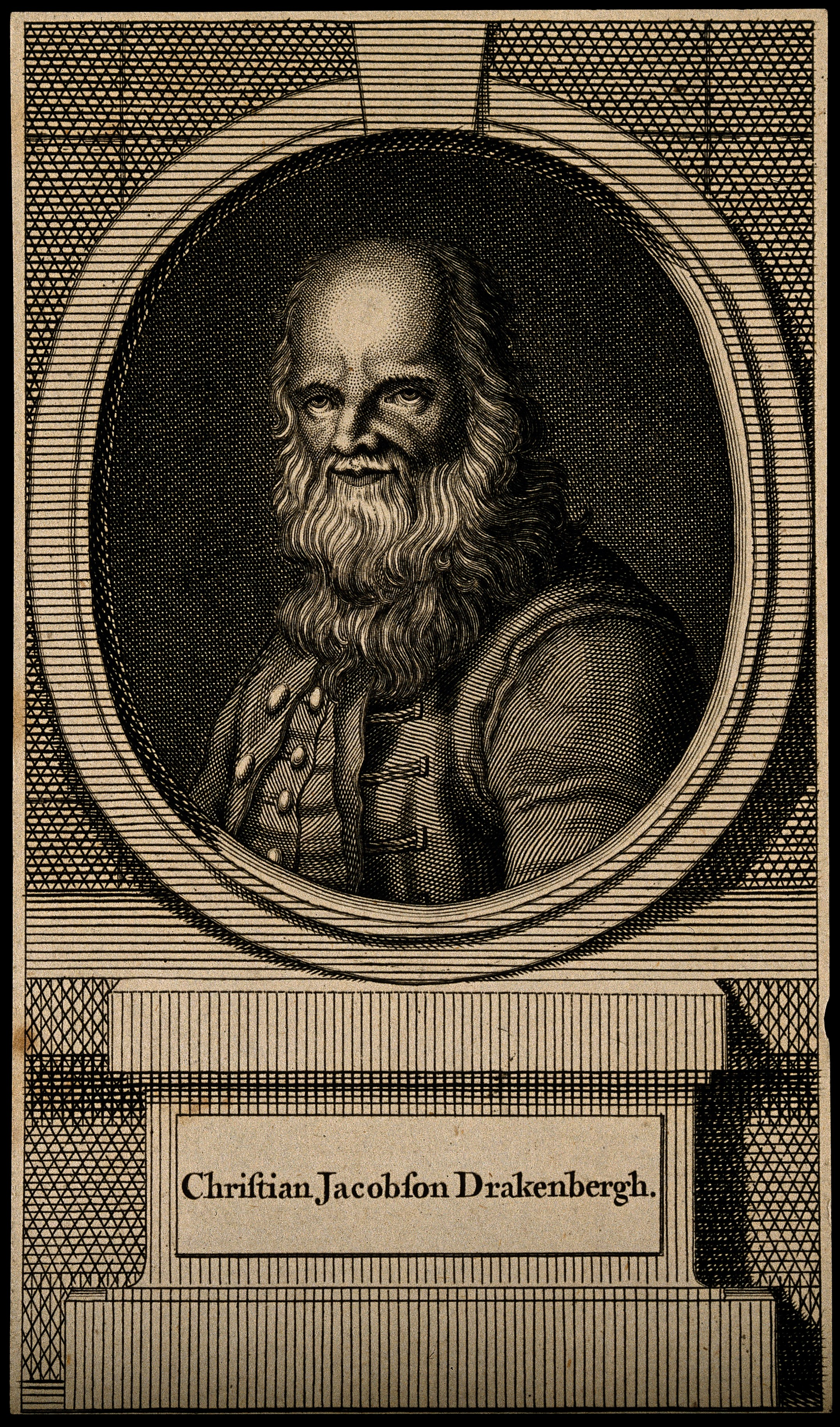
Engraving

== External references ==
- Den uråldrige sjömannen från Bohuslän
- Store Norske Leksikon – Christian Jacobsen Drakenberg – utdypning (NBL-artikkel)
- Drakenberg – Der uralte Mann und das Meer
- Sømand, soldat og slave Danmarks Radio documentary (12 March 2012)
