= Carex subinflata =

Scientific classification
- Kingdom: Plantae
- Clade: Tracheophytes
- Clade: Angiosperms
- Clade: Monocots
- Clade: Commelinids
- Order: Poales
- Family: Cyperaceae
- Genus: Carex
- Species: C. subinflata

Binomial name
- Carex subinflata Nelmes

Species of grass-like plant

Carex subinflata is a sedge of the Cyperaceae family that is native to southern parts of Africa in the Cape Provinces, the Free State, Lesotho and KwaZulu-Natal.

The sedge is a perennial herb with a tufted habit that typically grows to a height of 0.3 to 0.9 m (1 ft 0 in to 2 ft 11 in). It has flat or sometimes folded leaves with a blade that is around 220 mm (8.7 in) long and 6 to 10 mm (0.24 to 0.39 in) wide. Usually the upper part of the leaf is glabrous and the lower surface is covered in small round protuberances. The culms are triangular in cross section and have a diameter of 1.5 to 2 mm (0.059 to 0.079 in). The simple inflorescence at the end of the culm is a small cluster of spikes that is 65 to 110 mm (2.6 to 4.3 in) long.

The plant is found at higher altitudes in marshy grassland areas such as the Drakenberg, the High veld and sub-escarpment grassland areas.

== See also ==
- List of Carex species
