= Farm Workers Union of Central Sweden =

Trade union in Sweden

Farm Workers' Union of Central Sweden
- Mellersta Sverges lantarbetareförbund
- Merged into: Farm Workers Union of Sweden
- Founded: 1906
- Dissolved: 1908
- Headquarters: Eskilstuna, Södermanland, Sweden
- Location: Sweden
- Key people: Carl Albert Svedberg (Chairman), Julius Pettersson (Secretary), Carl Åkerberg (Treasurer)
- Affiliations: Swedish Social Democratic Party

Farm Workers Union of Central Sweden (Swedish: Mellersta Sverges lantarbetareförbund) was a trade union for agricultural workers in Sweden. The organization was active between 1906 and 1908. Carl Albert Svedberg was the chairman of the Farm Workers Union of Central Sweden. As of September 1907 the union had around one hundred local sections. The membership of the Farm Workers Union of Central Sweden was to a large extent concentrated to certain large agricultural estates. The key areas of activities of the union were located around Mälaren. The organization also established its presence in Västergötland, Östergötland, Dalarna and Gästrikland.

The launching of the new union was the result of a joint initiative of the district organizations of the Social Democratic Labour Party in Södermanland and Västmanland. The foundation of the union was preceded by one year of agitation, primarily in the agricultural areas surrounding the towns of Eskilstuna and Västerås (two important industrial centres).

The agitation was carried out by metal workers, displaced from their daily chores by a lock-out. The industrial trade unionists sought to create greater class consciousness amongst farm workers, as people from the country-side could easily be brought to the factories as scabs in times of industrial disputes. Furthermore, many industrial workers were themselves former farm labourers and sympathized with the plight of those toiling the lands. Local farm workers associations were formed in Västmanland, Sörmland and Östergötland. A conference held on July 29, 1906, decided that the Västmanland and Sörmland party district committees would serve as an interim leadership of the new union. The union held its founding congress on December 30, 1906. However, even prior to its official foundation the organization had achieved a level of success. As a result of the pre-foundation agitations the average annual wage of statare was raised by approximately 40 Swedish krona.

The founding congress of the union decided that the headquarters of the organization would be located in Eskilstuna. Carl Albert Svedberg was elected chairman, Julius Pettersson secretary and Carl Åkerberg treasurer (all three were from Eskilstuna).

The Farm Workers Union of Central Sweden published Lantarbetaren ('The Farm Worker').

The Farm Workers Union of Central Sweden advocated the formation of a nationwide union of agricultural labourers, a line which had a lukewarm response from the Farm Workers Union of Skåne. The organization merged into the Farm Workers Union of Sweden in August 1908. Svedberg became the chairman of the new nationwide union. Lantarbetaren was taken over by the new union as its organ in January 1909. The archives of the Farm Workers Union of Central Sweden are held by the Labour Movement Archives and Library.
