= Simon of Ireland =

Author of a Latin poem in late medieval Ireland

Simon of Ireland, of the late medieval era, was the author of a Latin poem "in seventeen lacklustre hexameters of a law case involving a parson's theft of an ox." Simon is notable because very little Latin verse is known to have been written in late medieval Ireland.
