= Drakenberg =

Drakenberg is a Swedish surname. Notable people with the surname include:

- Hans Drakenberg (1901–1982), Swedish fencer
- Otto Drakenberg (born 1966), Swedish fencer
- Christian Jacobsen Drakenberg (1626?–1772), Norwegian centenarian

== See also ==
- Drakensberg, highest mountain range in Southern Africa
