= Swedish Garden Workers Union =

Trade union in Sweden

The Swedish Garden Workers Union (Swedish: Svenska trädgårdsarbetareförbundet) was a trade union garden workers in Sweden. The union was founded on December 29, 1906. It was however disbanded in 1909. The union was revived in 1918. Its first section were the Garden Workers of Stockholm.

The union published Trädgårdsarbetaren ('The Garden Worker') between 1918 and 1920. A total of ten issues were published. John H. Johansson served as editor 1918-1919, Emil Erlandsson became editor in 1920. Between 1921 and 1924 the union published the monthly Svenska trädgårdsarbetaren.

The union merged into the Farm Workers Union of Sweden in 1924.
