= Trade Union Propaganda League =

Trade union in Sweden

The Trade Union Propaganda League (Swedish: Fackliga propagandaförbundet, abbreviated 'FPF') was a Swedish labour organization. FPF was founded in September 1919. The purpose of the organization was to coordinate the leftist groupings within the reformist-led Swedish Trade Union Confederation (LO), with the objective of winning over LO to a revolutionary line. The programme of FPF mentioned sabotage and general strike as means of struggle of the labour movement. During its existence, FPF organized trainings of agitators and issued various print publications.

FPF was closely connected to the Social Democratic Left Party of Sweden (SSV, later the Communist Party of Sweden). Officially, SSV stated that FPF had surged as a spontaneous initiative on behalf of local workers' groups. However, SSV financed activities of FPF and Karl Kilbom (a SSV executive committee member) acted as the spokesman of FPF. In many ways FPF was a continuation of a failed 1918 attempt (FO, 'the Trade Union Opposition') by SSV to gain influence in the trade union movement.

By the end of 1920 SSV claimed that FPF had 5,666 members, organized in 31 trade unions and 34 leftist and propaganda clubs. However, that figure was likely inflated. The activity report of FPF issued in January 1921 stated that FPF had 3,700 members. By January 1922 FPF claimed to have 5,450 members, in December the same year 3,235.

FPF retained contacts with the Red International of Labour Unions.

FPF was disbanded in 1923, as the organization had failed to make any major breakthrough.

== See also ==
- Farm Workers Union of Småland
- Forest and Farm Workers Union of Sweden
