= Blomsholm =

Area in Bohuslän, Sweden

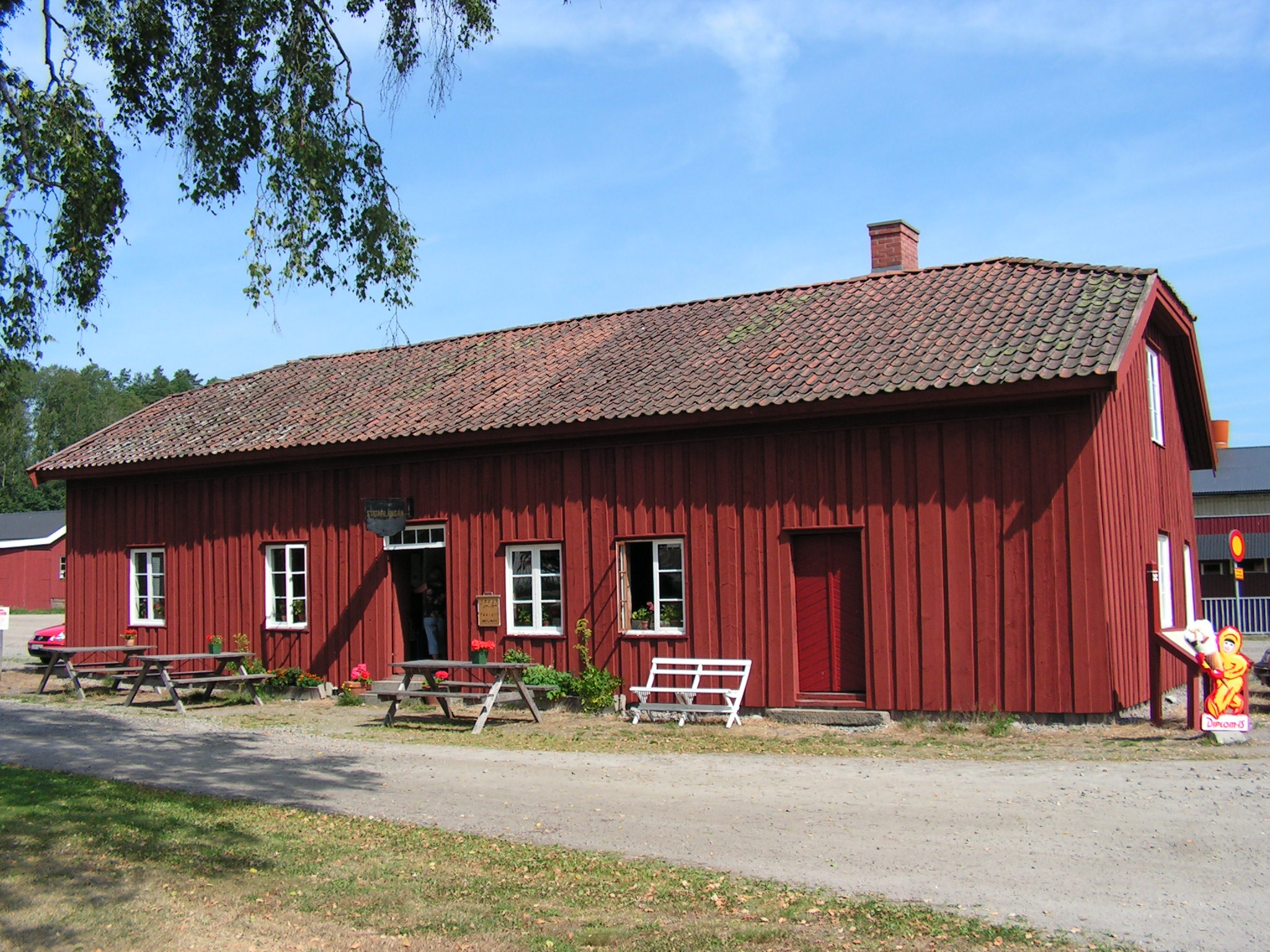

- Location within Sweden

General information
- Location: Bohuslän, Sweden
- Coordinates: 58°58′22.6″N 11°14′29.3″E

Blomsholm in Skee parish in Bohuslän, Sweden, is an area north of Strömstad where there are many ancient monuments from the Stone Age to the Middle Ages. Among other things, there are some of Sweden's largest stone circles and stone ships in the area. Unlike most other stone circles, the stone circle consists of an even number (10) of boulders around the centre stone. The diameter is 38 meters. The stone ship, meanwhile, is 41 meters long, 9 meters wide and consists of 49 stones. These have different heights, the stones amidships are one meter while the stones in the bow and stern are 4 meters high. Also 7 burial grounds from the Iron Age and the large mound Grönehög can be found here.

== Blomsholms Manor ==
Blomsholms manor, which was founded in 1625 by the North German nobleman Anders Blume, was first sold in 1628 and already in 1644, General Sven Ranck became the manor's fifth owner. A memorial stone from the 1660s over Sven Ranck and his wife Anna Bergengren is in the middle of the stone ship, even though they are not buried there.

At the beginning of the 18th century, the manor burned down and was replaced in 1710 by the buildings that still exist on the site. During Charles XII's war against Norway in 1718, the manor functioned as a field hospital because it was located on Galärvägen, the transport route that Charles XII used with the help of 800 soldiers to transport twelve ships (galleys) over land and via the lakes Strömsvattnet and Färingen to Ise Fjord. A local legend states that soldiers who died during the war are said to be buried in the stone ship.

Statarlängan, built in 1899, is today a restaurant and museum where one of the four apartments is decorated in the same way as it was when the last statesman lived here in 1938.

Blomsholm's estate has now been owned by GLG-fastigheter AB since 2012.

== Gallery ==
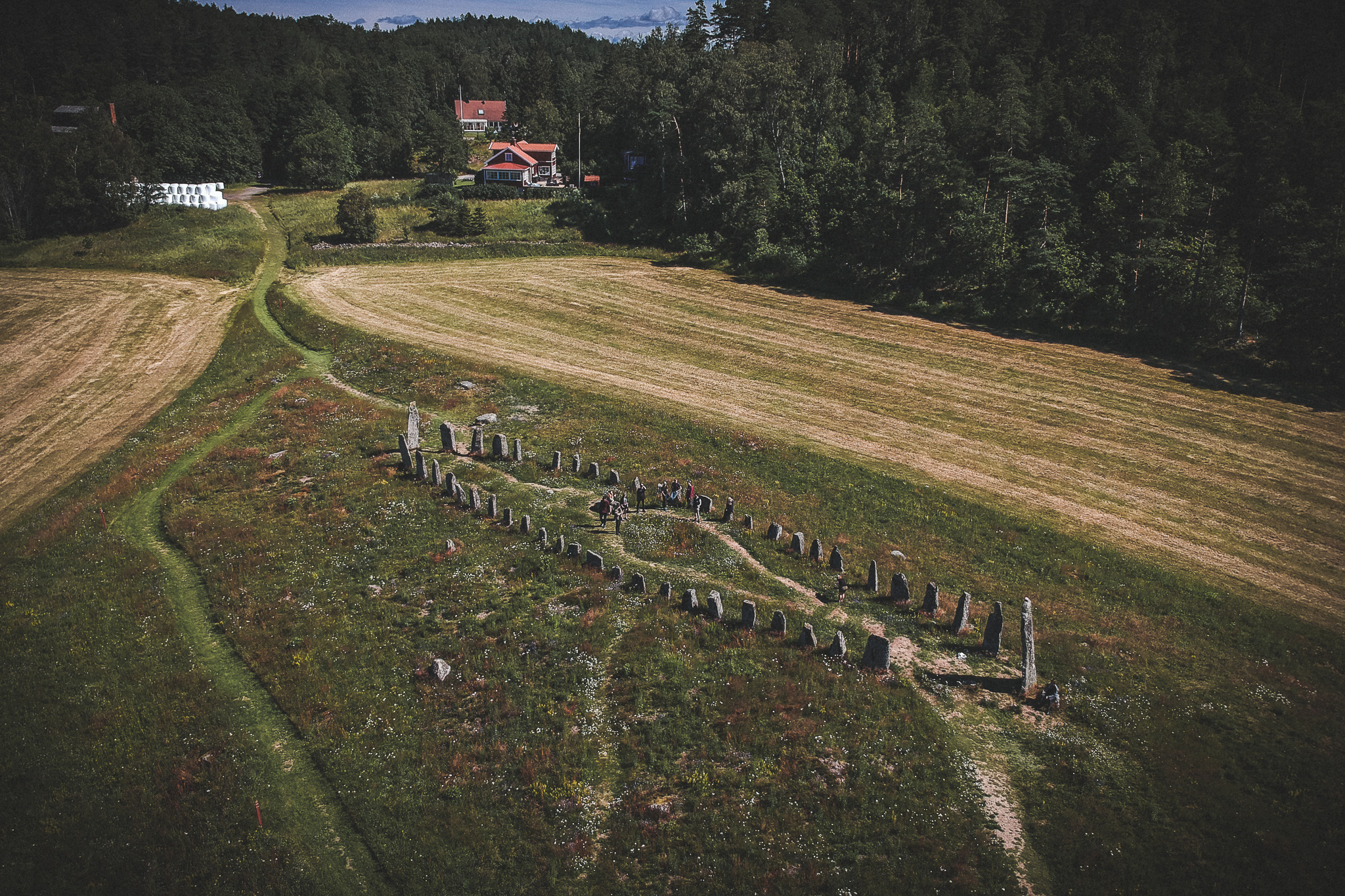
A stone ship tomb at Blomsholm.

== Literature ==
- Jan Ottander: Blomsholm. 2000 år av händelser. Länsstyrelsen i Västra Götalands län, Göteborg 1999, (Länsstyrelsen Västra Götaland 20, ISSN 1403-168X).
- Jan Ottander: Blomsholm. 2000 years of settlement. (Länsstyrelsen Västra Götaland publication 1999:20, ISSN 1403-168X).
