= In kind =

Goods, services, and transactions not involving money

The term in kind (or in-kind) generally refers to goods, services, and transactions not involving money or not measured in monetary terms. It is a part of many spheres, mainly economics, finance, but also politics, work career, food, health and others. There are many different types of in kind actions throughout the mentioned branches, which can be identified and distinguished.

== In-kind contributions ==
An in-kind contribution is a non-cash contribution of goods or a service. Those are either offered free or at less than usual charge for them. Similarly, when a person or entity pays for services on the committee’s behalf, the payment is also considered as an in-kind contribution. In-kind services and contributions are valued at their fair market value or at their actual cost. In other words, they are valued at what you would pay for them if they were not donated. There are two types of receivers of in-kind contributions: individuals and companies. For individuals, the provider of in-kind contributions is either another person or government. But for companies, those are partners or an external organisation.

=== Examples ===
- voluntary labour (for example, painting work)
- donated goods (for example, kitchen equipment)
- donated services (for example, professional advice from an architect)
- free use of equipment (for example, usage of cars or tools)

Voluntary workers should be entered under the staff costs budget line.

=== General rules for in-kind contributions for companies ===
- The partners must not have paid for the works, goods, services or land claimed as a contribution. It is not allowable to purchase works, goods services or land with the intention of using them to implement the project of a company and then to “donate” them as an in-kind contribution,.
- The value of the contribution claimed must not exceed the normal market costs, and the rationale for the value given in the claim must be capable of being verified. For example, where a project receives the donation of a vehicle, it would be expected that prices for vehicles of a similar model, age, and condition would be sourced for comparison.

=== Calculation of the value of in kind contributions ===
1. Voluntary labour is calculated at the minimum hourly wage for the country the voluntary workers are working in. An individual's time should be valued at what the organization would pay someone to perform the work if it were not performed by a volunteer.
2. Donated goods at the price you would pay for them if they were not donated. A common guideline is to consider how much the organization would reasonably expect to pay if it were to purchase the item.

=== Reporting and documenting in-kind contributions ===
The contributed services have to be recognized in the financial statements if the services received:

- create or enhance non-financial assets;
- require specialized skills;
- are provided by individuals possessing those skills, and
- would need to be purchased if not provided by donation.

It is necessary for in-kind contributions to be documented, accounted for and valued. All in-kind contributions should have supporting documentation, including why the transaction is allowable for the grant purposes.

== Payment in kind ==
Payment in kind is generally an exchange of goods or services for other goods or services with no medium of exchange.

They are one of the components of total earnings. That is why they should count as a part of the value on which social security contributions are based and calculated.

=== Income in kind ===
Income in-kind is then a non-cash reward received by an employee for work performed. This can include: drink, food, fuel, footwear, clothing, free or subsidized housing or transport, car parking, electricity, gym membership, nurseries, low or zero-interest loans or subsidized mortgages. According to the System of National Accounts (SNA 1993): "Income in kind may bring less satisfaction than income in cash because employees are not free to choose how to spend it. Some of the goods or services provided to employees may be of a type or quality which the employee would not normally buy."

==== Regulations of income in-kind ====
The safeguard and a legislative is needed in case someone wanted to abuse those benefits.

Different ways:

1. Allowing a maximum percentage of the wage: In-kind payments exceeding 50% of the wage are considered doubtful. Therefore countries set a threshold, which cannot be infringed by providing higher share of in kind income versus cash income. The majority of all countries have lower thresholds, with many not allowing in-kind payments exceeding 30 per cent of the wage. For example in Spain, the threshold reaches exactly 30%, moreover, in-kind payments are prohibited there as a part of the minimum wage.
2. Setting a maximum level: In some countries, a specific maximum value of in kind benefits in set in terms of money. It is an example of Switzerland, where food and housing can represent a maximum of 33 CHF per day. The similar system is in France.
3. Limiting the value of in-kind benefits to a multiple of the minimum wage: That is the case of countries such as Chad and Senegal, in which the value of one meal is equivalent to one hour worked at the minimum wage.

== In-kind transfers ==
=== In sense of investments ===
In-kind transfer is a process of moving assets from one brokerage account to another brokerage account without any selling or buying. An in-kind transfer from one brokerage account to another brokerage account is an easier method than liquidating the account into cash.

A list of investments that can be transferred in-kind:

- Stocks
- Bonds
- Options
- Mutual market capital funds
- Money market funds
- Certificates of deposit
- Exchange-traded funds

=== In sense of public spending ===
An in-kind transfer is also a type of public spending to help specific populations. It is in the form of specific goods and services, which recipients get for free or at a reduced rate from public organisation or government. By giving in-kind transfers, governments specify how individuals must use public assistance money. It simply covers only goods and services from predescribed areas, therefore it prevents receivers from misuse of such means. On the other hand, in-kind programs have sometimes been deemed “paternalistic” because they dictate that people spend assistance money on things governments deem most necessary.

== See also ==
- Barter
- Gift economy
- Income in kind
- PIK loan, short for payment in kind
- Quid pro quo
- Time banking
