= Swedish Agricultural Workers' Union =

Trade union in Sweden

The Swedish Agricultural Workers' Union (Swedish: Svenska Lantarbetareförbundet, SLF) was a trade union representing farm workers in Sweden.

The first Swedish Agricultural Workers' Union was established in 1908, with the merger of the Agricultural Workers' Union of Central Sweden and the Agricultural Workers' Union of Scania, but it failed to grow, and dissolved in 1912.

On 6 October 1918, a new Swedish Agricultural Workers' Union was established, at a conference in Mjölby. It initially had 1,717 members, and was based in Nyköping, but moved its headquarters to Stockholm in 1921, by which time membership had grown to 15,674. That year, the Forest and Agricultural Workers' Union of Central Sweden rejoined, having split away in 1919.

The Agricultural Workers' Union of Småland joined in 1920, followed by the Swedish Garden Workers Union in 1924. In 1921, there was a short-lived communist split, the Swedish Forest and Agricultural Workers' Union. In 1930, the Agricultural Workers' Union of Uppland merged in, and the union affiliated to the Swedish Trade Union Confederation.

Membership peaked at 48,649 in 1945, then fell, along with employment in the industry. By 2001, it was down to only 11,578. The following year, it merged into the Swedish Municipal Workers' Union.

== Presidents ==
1918: Albin Hansson
1929: Carl Albert Falk
1932: Gunnar Sträng
1945: Axel Johansson
1959: Ewald Jansson
1973: Börje Svensson
1988: Mats Hansson

== See also ==
- Farm Workers Union of Central Sweden, Swedish: Mellersta Sverges lantarbetareförbund
