= Parson =

Ordained Christian person responsible for a small area, typically a parish

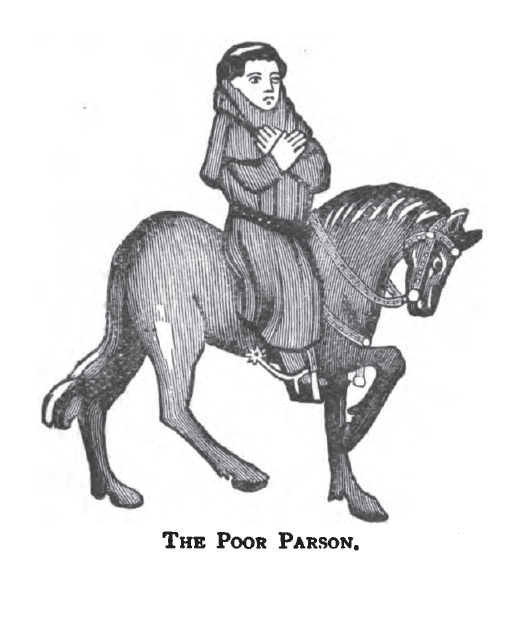
The Poor Parson is described in Canterbury Tales: The Prologue, by Geoffrey Chaucer

A parson is an ordained Christian person responsible for a small area, typically a parish. The term was formerly often used for some Anglican clergy and, more rarely, for ordained ministers in some other churches. It is no longer a formal term denoting a specific position within Anglicanism, but has some continued historical and colloquial use.

In the pre-Reformation church, a parson was the priest of an independent parish church, that is, a church not under the control of a larger ecclesiastical or monastic organization. The term is similar to rector and is in contrast to a vicar, a cleric whose revenue is usually, at least partially, appropriated by a larger organisation. Today the term is normally used for some parish clergy of non-Roman Catholic churches, in particular in the Anglican tradition in which a parson is the incumbent of a parochial benefice: a parish priest or a rector; in this sense a parson can be compared with a vicar. The title parson can be applied to clergy from certain other denominations. A parson is often housed in a church-owned home known as a parsonage.

== Anglicanism ==
William Blackstone's Commentaries on the Laws of England says that a parson is a parish priest with the fullest legal rights to the parish properties:

A parson, persona ecclesiae, is one that has full possession of all the rights of a parochial church. He is called parson, persona, because by his person the church, which is an invisible body, is represented; and he is in himself a body corporate, in order to protect and defend the rights of the church (which he personates) by a perpetual succession. He is sometimes called the rector, or governor, of the church: but the appellation of parson, (however it may be depreciated by familiar, clownish, and indiscriminate use) is the most legal, most beneficial, and most honorable title that a parish priest can enjoy; because such a one, (Sir Edward Coke observes) and he only, is said vicem seu personam ecclesiae gerere ("to carry out the business of the church in person")

— Bl. Comm. I.11.V, p. *372

Although often used colloquially to refer to any incumbent, in an official sense a parson is a rector.

== Ireland ==
In Ulster, in the early 17th century, every parish had a vicar and a parson instead of a co-arb and an erenagh. The vicar, like the co-arb, was always in orders. He said the mass (‘serveth the cure’) and received a share of the tithes. The parson, like the erenagh, had a major portion of the tithes, maintained the church and provided hospitality. As he was not usually in clerical orders, his responsibilities were mainly temporal.

However, there were differences in the divisions of the tithes between various dioceses in Tyrone. In the Diocese of Clogher, the vicar and the parson shared the tithes equally between them; in the Diocese of Derry, church income came from both tithes and the rental of church lands (‘temporalities’). The vicar and the parson each received one third of the tithes and paid an annual tribute to the bishop. In places where there was no parson, the erenagh continued to receive two thirds of the income in kind from the church lands, and delivered the balance, after defraying maintenance, to the bishop in cash as a yearly rental. In other places, the parson, the vicar and the erenagh shared the costs of church repairs equally between them. In the Diocese of Armagh the parson received two-thirds of the tithes and the vicar one third. The archbishop and the erenagh impropriated no part thereof because they received the entire income from the termon lands.

== See also ==
- Parson-naturalist
- Rectory
