= Truck wages =

Form of payment

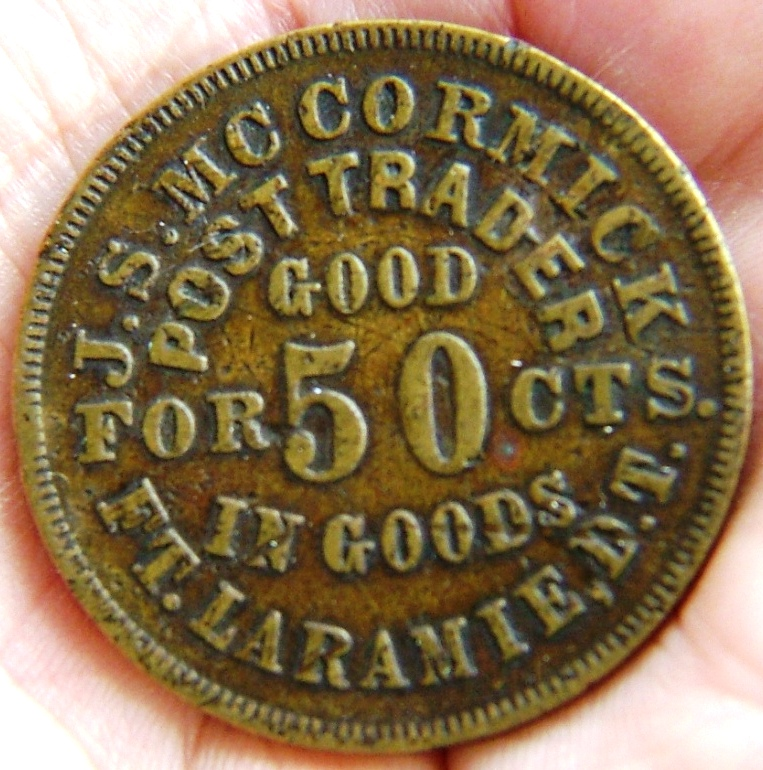
Brass trade token from Fort Laramie, Dakota Territory, used in a truck system

Truck wages are wages paid not in conventional money but instead in the form of payment in kind (i.e. commodities, including goods and/or services); credit with retailers; or a money substitute, such as scrip, chits, vouchers or tokens. Truck wages are a characteristic of a truck system, and are banned by the labour legislation of many countries.

"Truck", in this context, is a relatively archaic English word meaning "exchange" or "barter".

== Truck system ==
A truck system includes one or both of the following practices under which truck wages are used to defraud and/or exploit workers.

- Firstly, the truck wages are demonstrably of a lesser market value than the amount of money that would normally be paid for the same work.
- Secondly, truck systems limit employees' ability to choose how to spend their earnings. For example, credit or company scrip might be usable only for the purchase of goods at a monopolistic company-owned store, at which prices are set artificially high. As long as the company store is the only party able and willing to accept scrip for needed goods, there is no meaningful competition to lower prices. Hence, a truck system relies on a closed economic system in which employees are required to become subject to a retail monopoly in essential goods.

Truck systems have been specifically outlawed in many countries by labour law and employment standards; and legislation such as the British Truck Acts.

== History ==
=== Britain ===
While truck systems had long existed in many parts of the world, it was widespread during the 18th and early-19th centuries in Britain. Despite a long history of legislation intended to curb truck systems (Truck Acts), they remained common into the 20th century. In a prosecution brought against a Manchester cotton manufacturer in 1827 one worker gave evidence that he had received wages of only two shillings in nine months; the rest "he was obliged to take [in goods] from the manufacturer's daughter, who was also the cashier".

In Britain the truck system was sometimes referred to as the tommy system. The 1901 edition of Brewer's Dictionary of Phrase and Fable notes the tommy shop as:

Where wages are paid to workmen who are expected to lay out a part of the money for the good of the shop. Tommy means bread or a penny roll, or the food taken by a workman in his handkerchief; it also means goods in lieu of money.

In the "Midland Tour" of his Rural Rides, the agriculturist and political reformer William Cobbett reports the use of "the truck or tommy system" in Wolverhampton and Shrewsbury. He describes the logic of the tommy as:

The manner of carrying on the tommy system is this: suppose there to be a master who employs a hundred men. That hundred men, let us suppose, to earn a pound a week each. This is not the case in the iron-works; but no matter, we can illustrate our meaning by one sum as well as by another. These men lay out weekly the whole of the hundred pounds in victuals, drink, clothing, bedding, fuel, and house-rent. Now, the master finding the profits of his trade fall off very much, and being at the same time in want of money to pay the hundred pounds weekly, and perceiving that these hundred pounds are carried away at once, and given to shopkeepers of various descriptions; to butchers, bakers, drapers, hatters, shoemakers, and the rest; and knowing that, on an average, these shopkeepers must all have a profit of thirty per cent., or more, he determines to keep this thirty per cent. to himself; and this is thirty pounds a week gained as a shop-keeper, which amounts to 1,560l. a year. He, therefore, sets up a tommy shop: a long place containing every commodity that the workman can want, liquor and house-room excepted.

Although Cobbett sees nothing wrong in itself in the tommy system, he notes that "The only question is in this case of the manufacturing tommy work, whether the master charges a higher price than the shop-keepers would charge," but given the guaranteed market, Cobbett sees no reason why any master should ever abuse the system. However, in rural regions he notes the virtual monopoly of the shopkeeper:

I have often had to observe on the cruel effects of the suppression of markets and fairs, and on the consequent power of extortion possessed by the country shop-keepers. And what a thing it is to reflect on, that these shopkeepers have the whole of the labouring men of England constantly in their debt; have on an average a mortgage on their wages to the amount of five or six weeks, and make them pay any price that they choose to extort.

=== United States ===
One reason for the truck system in the early history of the United States is that there was no national form of paper currency and an insufficient supply of coinage. Banknotes were the majority of the money in circulation. Banknotes were discounted relative to gold and silver (e.g. a $5 banknote might be exchanged for $4.50 of coins) and the discount depended on the financial strength of the issuing bank and distance from the bank. During financial crises many banks failed and their notes became worthless.

== Relationship with company towns ==
Truck systems often existed in tandem with company towns (communities owned by an employer for the purpose of housing workers), which usually contained company stores. However, a truck system is not a prerequisite for the existence of a company town or vice versa.

Truck systems often persisted in long-settled, densely populated areas which hosted many employers and many merchants nominally in competition with one another. In such areas, their existence depended on the ability of employers to pay employees in scrip exchangeable at a company store. Such arrangements meant that potential nearby competitors were not typically in a position to accept the scrip at their stores (or at least not at a competitive exchange rate) since even if the company issuing the scrip was willing to accept it from non-employees, it would only accept it in exchange for goods at company-mandated prices. In this regard, employers' policies regarding the transferability of their scrip ranged from a willingness to accept it from anyone bearing it regardless of his or her relationship with the company (least restrictive) to refusing to accept scrip from anyone except the person it was paid to (most restrictive). The less restrictive the policy, the greater the potential workers paid in scrip could exchange it (likely at a discount) for goods and/or services the company store was unable (or unwilling) to provide, or for cash to obtain those goods and services. Indeed, one justification often given by employers for paying in scrip was that it supposedly prevented their workers from spending their earnings on "immoral" goods and services such as alcohol and prostitution.

On the other hand, a company town in a remote area with both the ability to keep out any potential competition for company stores, and an ample supply of cash, might be able to exploit workers in a manner similar to that of a truck system without actually employing a truck system. If the company store is the only vendor to which employees in a remote location have reasonable access to obtain goods, then such a company is in a position to pay wages in cash while charging inflated prices (also in cash) at the company store.

== See also ==
- Company store
- Company town
- Wage slavery
- Debt bondage
- Truck Acts
- Statare - Sweden
- Coal scrip
- Token coins
