= Skee, Sweden =

Skee
- Location within Västra Götaland Location within Sweden
- Coordinates: 58°56′N 11°19′E
- Country: Sweden
- Province: Bohuslän
- County: Västra Götaland County
- Municipality: Strömstad Municipality

Area
  - Total: 1.12 km^{2} (0.43 sq mi)

Population (31 December 2010)
  - Total: 583
  - Density: 522/km^{2} (1,350/sq mi)
- Time zone: UTC+1 (CET)
  - Summer (DST): UTC+2 (CEST)

Skee (Swedish pronunciation: [ˈɧêːɛ]) is a locality situated in Strömstad Municipality, Västra Götaland County, Sweden, with 583 inhabitants in 2010.

== See also ==
- Blomsholm
