= Jan Fridegård =

Swedish writer (1897–1968)

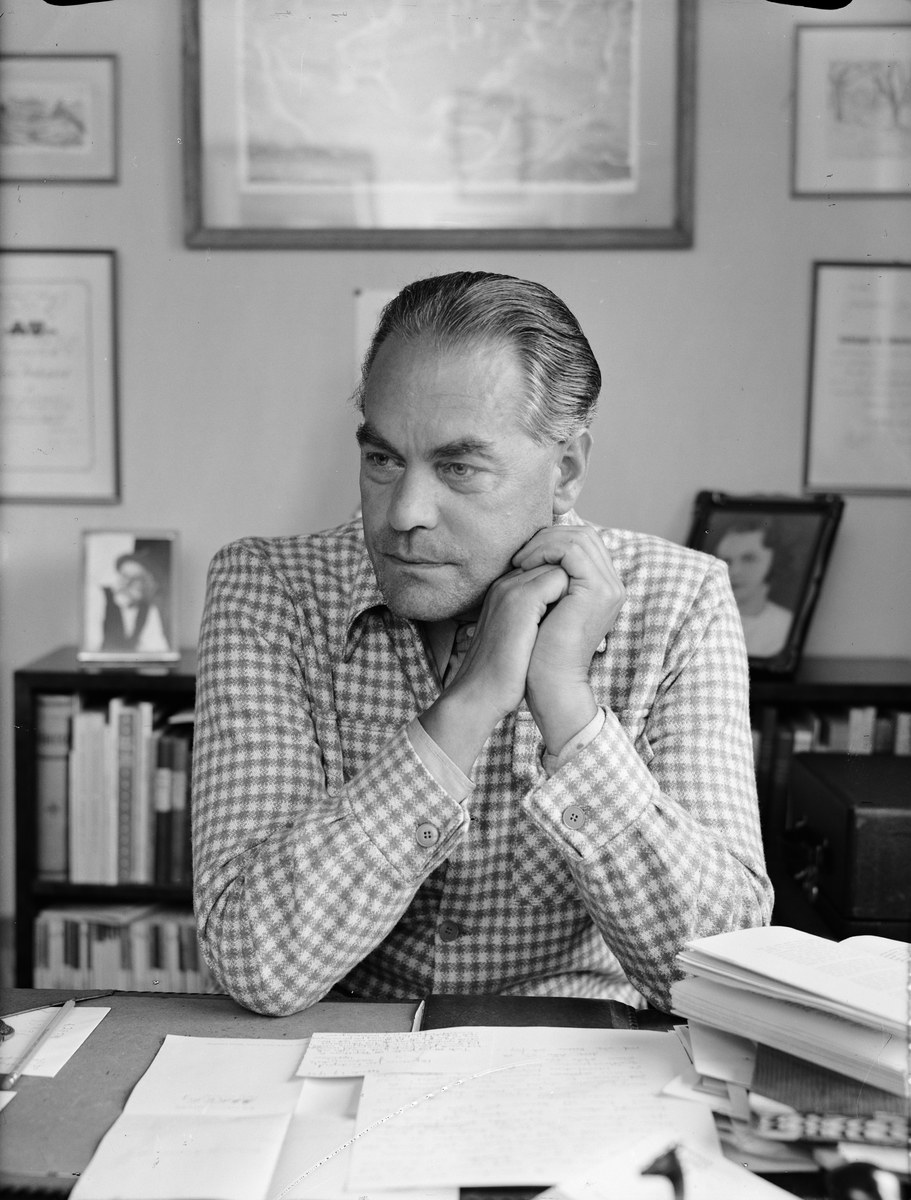
- Fridegård in 1940s
- Born: Johan Fridolf Johansson; 14 June 1897; Uppland, Sweden
- Died: 8 September 1968 (aged 71)
- Resting place: Uppsala gamla kyrkogård
- Writing career
- Language: Swedish

Jan Fridegård (born Johan Fridolf Johansson, (14 June 1897 – 8 September 1968), also known as Fride Johansson, was a Swedish writer of the proletarian school.

Fridegård grew up among statare in Uppland. He later held various jobs, including joining the Swedish cavalry, before publishing his first books in the early 1930s. He changed his name formally to Fridegård in 1930, having published works under the names Fride Johansson, Fride Johannesson and Johan Magerman before.

Fridegård's breakthrough was the socially critical, semi-autobiographical novel about Lars Hård, first published in three volumes 1935-1936 and later in a single volume. Controversial at the time, it provoked criticism from contemporary critics for its depiction of the immoral protagonist and Fridegård's straightforward writing style, but it has since been regarded as a classic in Swedish literature.

A prolific author, Fridegård later wrote several historical novels, including a trilogy of novels about the Viking Era in Sweden: Trägudars land (1940; translated 1989 as Land of Wooden Gods), Gryningsfolket (1944; translated 1990 as People of the Dawn) and Offerrök (trans. 1991 as Sacrificial Smoke), and books with spiritualism themes.

== Bibliography ==
- 1931 – Den svarta lutan
- 1933 – En natt i juli
- 1935 – Jag Lars Hård
- 1936 – Barmhärtighet
- 1936 – Tack för himlastegen
- 1937 – Offer
- 1938 – Äran och hjältarna
- 1939 – Statister (bok)|Statister
- 1940 – Trägudars land
- 1941 – Torntuppen
- 1942 – Här är min hand
- 1944 – Gryningsfolket
- 1944 – Kvarnbudet
- 1947 – Fäderna:stenåldern
- 1948 – Johan From, Lars Hård och andra
- 1949 – Offerrök
- 1950 – Kvinnoträdet
- 1951 – Lars Hård går vidare
- 1952 – Johan Vallareman och andra sagor
- 1952 – Porten kallas trång
- 1953 – Vägen heter smal
- 1954 – Sommarorgel
- 1955 – Larsmässa
- 1955 – Lyktgubbarna
- 1956 – Flyttfåglarna
- 1956 – From och Hård
- 1957 – Arvtagarna
- 1958 – En bland eder
- 1959 – Muren
- 1959 – Svensk soldat
- 1960 – Soldathustrun
- 1961 – Mot öster - soldat!
- 1962 – Soldatens kärlek
- 1963 – Hemkomsten
- 1963 – Den gåtfulla vägen
- 1964 – På oxens horn
- 1965 – Lättingen
- 1965 – Noveller
- 1966 – Det kortaste strået
- 1967 – Tre stigar

=== Posthumous releases ===
- 1968 – Hallonflickan
- 1971 – Den blå dragonen. Självbiografiska berättelser
- 1973 – Ängslyckan och andra berättelser
