= Farm Workers Union of Småland =

Trade union in Sweden

- Smålands lantarbetareförbund
- Founded: 1919
- Dissolved: 1920
- Location: Sweden
- Key people: S. G. Lorén (chairman), Axel Tjäder (secretary)
- Affiliations: linked to Trade Union Propaganda League

The Farm Workers Union of Småland (Swedish: Smålands lantarbetareförbund) was a trade union for agricultural workers in Småland, Sweden. The union was founded in 1919.

The Farm Workers Union of Småland was connected to the Trade Union Propaganda League and the Social Democratic Left Party. The Social Democratic Left Party and the Social Democratic Youth League carried out agitations in Småland during 1919. As a result of the agitations, the Farm Workers Union of Småland was set up as an independent regional agricultural workers' organization. Two men from Huskvarna shared the leadership of the union, Sven G. Lorén as chairman and Axel Tjäder as secretary. Lorén was also a member of the national party leadership and editor of Norra Småland.

The bylaws of the union were largely copied from the Farm Workers Union of Sweden. The most notable difference from the original was a passage in the first paragraph, stating that the union strived for cooperation with the Social Democratic Left Party.

The Farm Workers Union of Sweden deplored the formation of a separate farm workers union in Småland. Their chairman, Albin Hansson, pleaded to the Småland union to merge into their organization into the nationwide union structure. Hansson's pleas were heard, and the third (and last) conference of the Farm Workers Union of Småland held on January 4, 1920 decided to enter the Farm Workers Union of Sweden as its regional organization in Småland. The Småland district organization would retain its left-socialist orientation for some time to come.
