= Statare =

Agriculture-employed person in Sweden

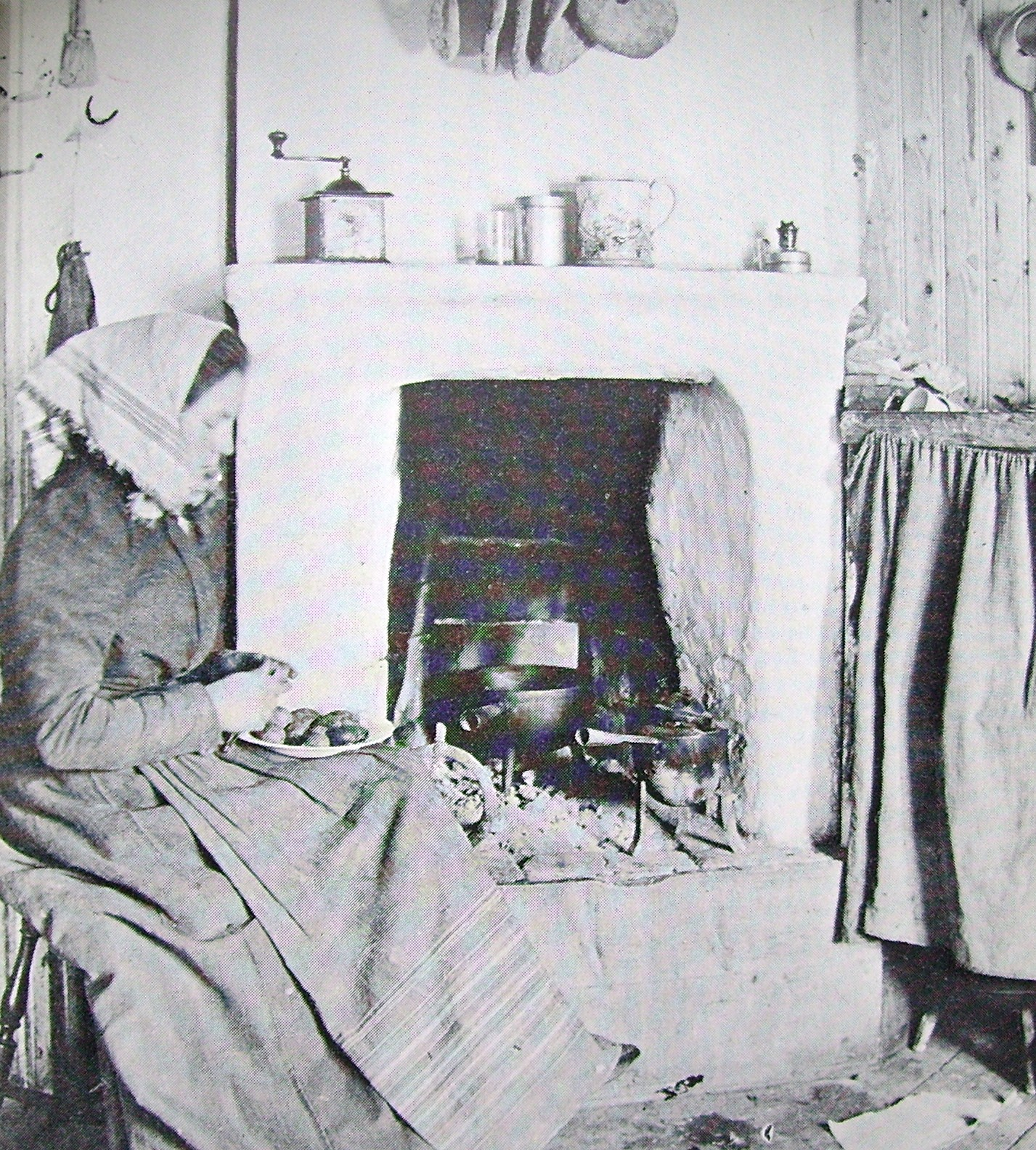
Interior of cabin. Photo: Nordiska museet

Statare were contract-workers living under serf-like conditions in Swedish agriculture who, contrary to other farmhands, were expected to be married, were provided with a simple dwelling for their family, and instead of eating at the servants' table were paid in kind with foodstuff. They were, similarly to most other farmworkers, contracted on an annual basis. The family members' willingness to work, at some places unpaid, was taken for granted. This system became increasingly common during the 19th century, attracted much public critique in the 20th century, and was abolished from November 1, 1945 through a collective bargaining agreement.

These agricultural laborers were generally viewed as being on the lowest rungs of Swedish society, worse off than crofters. Their lives were described by prominent Swedish novelists and writers such as Ivar Lo-Johansson, Jan Fridegård and Moa Martinson, making a considerable impact on the public debate in the decades following common suffrage. Their lives are also described by Swedish American novelist Helen Lundström Erwin in her novel Sour Milk in Sheep's Wool, published 2021.

Counties with the largest shares of noble tax-exempted land possession. Different colors for different counties. Red: >50%, orange: 40-50%

The system was promoted by agrarian reforms resulting in enlarged fields and by expanding markets for grain, meat and dairy. It occurred almost exclusively on farms greater than 60 hectares (150 acres), mainly in regions of central and southern Sweden where families from the landed nobility were dominant land owners. On many manors the statare system replaced manorial tenant farming. It reached its maximum extent in the decades around year 1900. Thereafter the system gradually declined until it was formally abolished in 1945.

== Terminology ==
=== English ===
Contract worker is used in recent (21st century) journals on economic history.

Truck servant was used in early 20th century international comparisons by the U.S. Department of Labor.

=== Swedish ===
The word statare applies to all family members. It is a popular version of stat-folk, avoiding the sensitive part "-folk" that here indicates the uneducated populace. Hence skilled artisans and more qualified manorial employees, as smiths, gardeners, bookkeepers, managers, etc., were not counted as statare, although similarly contracted on an annual basis, provided with a dwelling, and paid in kind.

In official records (the parish registers), stat-dreng and stat-torpare are the most common titles for the employee (stat- was a Swedish word for "payment in kind"), whereas the term statare dominates in the public debate on social issues. Widows, wives and children may be mentioned as statar-enka, statar-hustru, and statar-barn.

Also "married farmhand" (gift dreng) has been used, particularly initially. The term as such gives no clue to whether he was provided with a home for his family, or slept in the chamber of the farmhands, but had its own negative connotation, as farmhands traditionally were not supposed to marry.

== Background ==
The parliamentary rule during the Age of Liberty (1718–1772) invited citizens to debate and discussion, to a freer formation of opinion, not the least on public affairs. After the Great Northern War, the monarchs were no longer trusted. And the landed nobility had lost its say in the Great Reduction of 1680. New ideas of rationalism, individualism and meritocracy found their way from the European continent to remote towns and cities in Sweden.

=== Reforms ===
Numerous suggestions were made to reverse the widespread poverty in the country. New crops and rational agricultural reforms were much discussed. Innovative entrepreneurs were hailed.

The era saw the creation of a progressive "civil service nobility", i.e. civil officers who were ennobled before promotion to a governmental position that the nobility had secured sole rights to. Once nobilitated, they were free to buy tax-exempted land from the landed nobility.

The statare-system was first proposed in 1750 as a combination of the manorial corvée system, and the established peasant system with unmarried servants living in the master's home. A kind of large farms were conceived, like plantations, that hardly existed anywhere in the country yet. Meanwhile, enclosure was enacted in several phases, starting with Storskiftet in 1757. The ideal became farms with one singular continuous piece of farmland, which should liberate inventive farmers from their conservative neighbors.

Tenant farmers and freeholders did in fact use this freedom to experiment with new crops. But it would turn out that the most inventive were the new owners of manors, who followed news, were financially better connected, were unhampered by tradition and conservative landlords, and who in comparison with the previous owners, the ancient nobility, lacked sentimental feelings of responsibility for their peasants, nor did they see their land as merely a source of a yearly rent, but rather as a project to be refined and streamlined according to modern theories. Furthermore, from 1809, common people were allowed to buy tax-exempted farms from the landed nobility.

=== Population growth ===
Between 1750 and 1850, the population of Sweden doubled. New farmsteads could not compensate for this rapid change. Previously, custom had been that sons and daughters of freeholders and tenant farmers were educated as servants on other farms before marriage and before inheriting a farm of their own. Now more and more farmhands wished to marry without access to a tenant farm.

=== Evictions of peasants ===
Until 1660, Danish laws and customs gave considerably more freedom to noble land holders than the Swedish. During the long Great Northern War(1700–1721), noble military officers had had good opportunities to compare their own limitations with the liberties of noble estate holders in contemporary Livonia, Poland, Russia and the Ottoman Empire, as during the Thirty Years' War. With Sweden's Law on Privileges for the Nobility (1723), the conditions were reversed, granting the Swedish nobility unlimited rights to corvée-work from their tenant farmers, and also freedom to evict them at will.

Around year 1800, preconditions for the statare system were present at manors in the Mälaren Valley (i.e. the greater Stockholm region). By then, roads were improved, goods could be transported in wagons, and enclosures were either finished or soon to be. The demesnes of the manors became increasingly dependent on corvée from tenant farmers, crofters and cotters. Tenant farmers on many noble estates were evicted, abruptly in some places. Instead of their corvée, the manors employed day laborers and farmhands of a new kind: older, experienced, and married. The evicted tenants were by law required, like anyone else who didn't own their house, to accept any employment they could find, even a position as a farmhand, disgraceful for a married man as it was.

Tenants under the church and the crown were indirectly affected, as tenure became scarcer.

This development occurred similarly in the southernmost province of Scania, although a generation later. The explanation for this delay is usually presented in terms of corvée being easier to exact in the formerly Danish provinces (Scania, Halland, Blekinge).

== Statare as a social issue ==
Industrialization had arrived late in Sweden, but in the 1920s this new change in Swedish society contrasted starkly with the poor conditions for statare families; their circumstances were increasingly seen as a disturbing relic of pre-modern society. Between World Wars I and II, it became a theme in public discourse:

1. The housing situation was regarded as very poor. The barracks-like rural family dwellings, that estate owners had built for their contract-workers, were unpleasant, crowded, drafty and dirty. The employee on a one-year contract had no incentive to improve their dwelling. Neither had the employer.
2. The working conditions were lagging behind those of industrial workers and were poor in terms of working hours and tasks. The occupation as contract-worker was the way out for the worst off—given they were able for the work.
3. Also the family situation was depicted as chaotic, with the wives bound to carry out work away from home many times a day (above all for milking), clashing with the bourgeois housewife ideal.
4. The children's schooling often suffered as a consequence of the frequent moves from place to place.
5. They were poorly organized, seen from a labour union perspective.

The appearance of a growing class of country side proletarians, without any prospects of ever getting neither tenure nor a land of their own, created unease. The general belief was that contract-workers were treated as if they had no legal rights, and often moved when their one-year period expired. In reality, many stayed for extended periods, particularly at manors where they were treated relatively better. Despite farm bailiffs in many case made use of the employer's advantageous position, rather, the problem was this law required men and unmarried women to get employed unless they owned their own house or rented land enough to support their family. Although abolished in 1926, its impact lingered.

By the 1930s, the housing situation had improved and was favorably comparable with that of woodcutters and road workers. More statare unionized, and minimum standards were set through collective agreements. Smallholders lived in houses of roughly equal standard (but were in average older and with fewer children at home). For industrial workers, the improvement was more obvious. A lesser share of them lived in houses classified as dilapidated, they had significantly fewer children, and two-room apartments were usual for larger families.

The improvements were too slow compared to public opinion. Statare became the epitome of desperation and resignation in a highly exploited lower class. This was highlighted by the social journalism of the 1930s whose principal message was the contemptible standard of housing and hygiene in rural areas. The reports were compiled into book form and received much attention.

== See also ==
- Indentured servitude
- Truck system
