= Income in kind =

Income other than money

Income in kind, or in-kind income, is income other than money income. It includes many employee benefits and government-provided goods and services, such as toll-free roads, food stamps, public schooling, or socialized medicine.

== Types of income in kind ==
- Free rent in exchange for caretaking duties.
  - Note: If the caretaker receives a paycheck with an amount for rent deducted, the gross earnings are earned income, not in-kind income.
- Free room and board provided by a friend or relative.
- Free clothing or household goods provided by a community organization.
- Exchange of services, such as babysitting.

== Tax and benefit treatment ==
Income in kind may be treated differently depending on whether it is received as employment compensation, public assistance, or private support. In employment, non-cash benefits are often treated as fringe benefits. In the United States, taxable fringe benefits are generally included in an employee's gross income and may be subject to income tax withholding and employment taxes unless a specific exclusion applies.

In social benefit systems, in-kind support may affect eligibility or payment amounts. For example, the United States Supplemental Security Income programme treats certain in-kind support and maintenance as unearned income when a person receives food or shelter, or any combination of them, from another person, although food is no longer included in these calculations from 30 September 2024.

== See also ==
- Barter
- In kind
- Local exchange trading system
- Employee benefits
- Truck system
- Subsistence economy
