= Hate speech laws by country =

Hate speech is public speech that expresses hate or encourages violence towards a person or group based on something such as race, religion, sex, or sexual orientation. Hate speech is "usually thought to include communications of animosity or disparagement of an individual or a group on account of a group characteristic such as race, colour, national origin, sex, disability, religion, or sexual orientation".

== Hate speech laws by country or region ==
=== Australia ===
Australia's hate speech laws have varied by jurisdiction. A new bill passed both houses of parliament on 20 January 2026, and would come into force as the Combatting Antisemitism, Hate and Extremism (Criminal and Migration Laws) Act 2026 the day after this Act receives royal assent. The bill came into place following the 2025 Bondi Beach shooting.

=== Algeria ===
Until 28 April 2020, there was no formal or clear law banning hate speech in the Algerian Penal Code. This additional law No.20/05, prohibits and combats bigotry and hate speech define hate speech as any kind of expression that spreads, incites, encourages, or justifies racial hatred, and other forms of hatred such as humiliation, hostility, or violence against person or group on the basis of their race, religion, ethnic origin, national origin, sex, Health status, disability, Geographical affiliation, or gender identity. It does, however, contain a ban against anyone that produces, maintains, or supervises a dedicated website or electronic account for the purpose of endorsing any initiative, concept, news, or sketches or pictures that may incite bigotry and hate in society which can result in a sentence of five to ten years in prison and a penalty of 5,000,000 to 10,000,000 DZD.

=== Belgium ===
The Belgian Anti-Racism Law, in full, the Law of 30 July 1981 on the Punishment of Certain Acts inspired by Racism or Xenophobia, is a law against hate speech and discrimination that the Federal Parliament of Belgium passed in 1981. It made certain acts motivated by racism or xenophobia illegal. It is also known as the Moureaux Law.

The Belgian Holocaust denial law, passed on 23 March 1995, bans public Holocaust denial. Specifically, the law makes it illegal to publicly "deny, play down, justify or approve of the genocide committed by the Nazi German regime during the Second World War." Prosecution is led by the Belgian Centre for Equal Opportunities. The offense is punishable by imprisonment of up to one year and fines of up to €3,500.

=== Brazil ===
In Brazil, according to the 1988 Brazilian Constitution (article 5, item XLII), racism is an "Offense with no statute of limitations and no right to bail for the defendant." In 2019, Brazil's Supreme Court (STF) ruled that the racism crime law should be applied to homophobia and transphobia as well.

=== Canada ===
In Canada, advocating genocide against any "identifiable group" is an indictable offence under the Criminal Code and it carries a maximum sentence of five years' imprisonment. There is no minimum sentence.

Publicly inciting hatred against any identifiable group is also an offence. It can be prosecuted either as an indictable offence with a maximum sentence of two years' imprisonment, or as a summary conviction offence with a maximum sentence of six months' imprisonment. There are no minimum sentences in either case. The offence of publicly inciting hatred makes exceptions for cases of statements of truth, and subjects of public debate and religious doctrine. The landmark judicial decision upholding the constitutionality of this law was R v Keegstra, decided in 1990.

An "identifiable group" is defined for both offences as "any section of the public distinguished by colour, race, religion, national or ethnic origin, age, sex, sexual orientation, gender identity or expression or mental or physical disability".

=== Mainland China ===
Article 249 of the Criminal Law of China states that anyone who incites ethnic hatred or discrimination may be sentenced to short-term custody, non-custodial correction, deprivation of political rights, or fixed-term imprisonment for up to 10 years, depending on the severity of the circumstances.

=== Chile ===
Article 31 of the "Ley sobre Libertades de Opinión e Información y Ejercicio del Periodismo" (statute on freedom of opinion and information and the performance of journalism), punishes with a large fine those who "through any means of social communication makes publications or transmissions intended to promote hatred or hostility towards persons or a group of persons due to their race, sex, religion or nationality". This law has been applied to expressions transmitted via the internet. There is also a rule increasing the penalties for crimes motivated by discriminatory hatred.

=== Czech Republic ===
The Czech Republic prohibits hate speech under its Criminal Code, which includes inciting hatred, discrimination, or violence against specific groups based on race, religion, nationality, or other affiliations, with potential penalties including prison sentences. Specific provisions outlaw defamation of nations, denial or justification of genocide, and expressing sympathy for movements that suppress human rights. While freedom of expression is protected, it is limited by these provisions, and the government also monitors and prosecutes extremism, which can involve hate speech.

A person can be sentenced to up to two years in prison for publicly inciting hatred against any nation, race, ethnic group, religion, class, or other group, or for inciting the restriction of their rights and freedoms. The concept of extremism also covers hate speech, particularly through the promotion of violence against specific groups or historical revisionism. It is illegal to deny, question, approve, or justify genocide, including the Holocaust.

The Security Information Service (BIS) monitors extremism and prejudiced hatred, and the government prosecutes individuals for hate crimes and related offenses, as seen in the convictions for defamation, genocide denial, and inciting hatred in 2023.

=== Croatia ===
The Croatian Constitution guarantees freedom of speech, but the Croatian penal code prohibits discrimination and punishes anyone "who based on differences of race, religion, language, political or other belief, wealth, birth, education, social status or other properties, gender, skin color, nationality or ethnicity violates basic human rights and freedoms recognized by the international community."

=== Denmark ===
Denmark prohibits hate speech, and defines it as publicly making statements by which a group is threatened (trues), insulted (forhånes) or degraded (nedværdiges) due to race, skin colour, national or ethnic origin, faith or sexual orientation.

=== Estonia ===
Estonia has not enacted any criminal legislation regarding hate speech.

In November 2020, the European Union started infringement proceedings against Estonia because it had not adopted laws against hate speech.

In December 2020, the Estonian Parliament voted to reject a bill submitted by the Reform Party to criminalize hate speech.

In April 2022, symbols of "hate and aggression" were temporarily banned around strategic dates commemorating Russian victory in World War II, but paragraphs concerning hate speech itself were not accepted due to Estonia's strong free speech laws still on the books. The law concerning symbols was later made permanent if they are used publicly to support the relevant groups, while hate speech remains legal as long as it does not directly call to violence or discrimination.

=== Europe ===
The Council of Europe-sponsored "No Hate Speech" movement actively raises awareness about hate speech, in order to help combat the problem. While Article 10 of the European Convention on Human Rights does not prohibit criminal laws against revisionism such as denial or minimization of genocides or crimes against humanity, as interpreted by the European Court of Human Rights (ECtHR), the Committee of Ministers of the Council of Europe went further and recommended in 1997 that member governments "take appropriate steps to combat hate speech" under its Recommendation R (97) 20. The ECtHR does not offer an accepted definition for "hate speech" but instead offers only parameters by which prosecutors can decide if the "hate speech" is entitled to the protection of freedom of speech.

A growing awareness of this topic has resulted from educational programs in schools, which has enhanced reporting of hate speech incidences. The Council of Europe also created the European Commission against Racism and Intolerance, which has produced country reports and several general policy recommendations, for instance against antisemitism and intolerance against Muslims.

=== Finland ===
There has been considerable debate over the definition of "hate speech" (vihapuhe) in the Finnish language. If "hate speech" is taken to mean ethnic agitation, it is prohibited in Finland and defined in the section 11 of the penal code, War crimes and crimes against humanity, as published information or as an opinion or other statement that threatens or insults a group because of race, nationality, ethnicity, religion or conviction, sexual orientation, disability, or a comparable basis. Ethnic agitation is punishable with a fine or up to two years in prison, or four months to four years if aggravated (such as incitement to genocide).

Critics claim that, in political contexts, labeling certain opinions and statements "hate speech" can be used to silence unfavorable or critical opinions and suppress debate. Certain politicians, including Member of Parliament and the leader of the Finns Party Jussi Halla-aho, consider the term "hate speech" problematic because of the disagreement over its definition.

=== France ===
France's penal code and press laws prohibit public and private communication that is defamatory or insulting, or that incites discrimination, hatred, or violence against a person or group on account of place of origin, ethnicity or lack thereof, nationality, race, specific religion, sex, sexual orientation, or handicap. The law prohibits declarations that justify or deny crimes against humanity—for example, the Holocaust (Gayssot Act).

In July 2019, Laetitia Avia proposed a bill to fight hate speech on social media. The Avia law was passed on May 13, 2020. It requires websites to remove content that contains hate speech within 24 hours after publication. Failure to comply is punishable by one year of imprisonment and a fine of up to €15,000. On 18 June 2020, the French Constitutional Council rejected most of the draft law.

=== Germany ===
In Germany, Volksverhetzung ("incitement to hatred") is a punishable offense under Section 130 of the Strafgesetzbuch (Germany's criminal code) and can lead to up to five years' imprisonment. Section 130 makes it a crime to publicly incite hatred against parts of the population or to call for violent or arbitrary measures against them or to insult, maliciously slur or defame them in a manner violating their (constitutionally protected) human dignity. Thus for instance it is illegal to publicly call certain ethnic groups "maggots" or "freeloaders". Volksverhetzung is punishable in Germany even if committed abroad and even if committed by non-German citizens, if only the incitement of hatred takes effect within German territory, e.g., the seditious sentiment was expressed in German writing or speech and made accessible in Germany (German criminal code's Principle of Ubiquity, Section 9 §1 Alt. 3 and 4 of the Strafgesetzbuch).

On June 30, 2017, Germany approved a bill criminalizing hate speech on social media sites. Among criminalizing hate speech, the law states that social networking sites may be fined up to €50 million (US$56 million) if they persistently fail to remove illegal content within a week, including defamatory "fake news".

In 2020, the Bundestag introduced further regulations to combat hate speech and online extremism in response to a series of far-right terror attacks in Germany in 2019 and early 2020. As part of the updated Network Enforcement Act (NetzDG), penalties for online insults were increased, and social media companies faced stricter reporting obligations. The reforms also introduced provisions to allow prosecution for voicing public approval of serious crimes that have not yet occurred, such as endorsing or sharing threatening posts on social media. Starting in 2022, platforms were required to report the IP addresses of users posting neo-Nazi propaganda, threats of serious violence, or media depicting sexual abuse to Germany’s federal police.

=== Iceland ===
In Iceland, the hate speech law is not confined to inciting hatred, as one can see from Article 233 a. in the Icelandic Penal Code, but includes public denigration:

Anyone who publicly mocks, defames, denigrates or threatens a person or group of persons by comments or expressions of another nature, for example by means of pictures or symbols, for their nationality, colour, race, religion, sexual orientation or gender identity, or disseminates such materials, shall be fined or imprisoned for up to 2 years.

=== India ===
Freedom of speech and expression is protected by article 19(1) of the constitution of India, but under article 19(2) "reasonable restrictions" can be imposed on freedom of speech and expression in the interest of "the sovereignty and integrity of India, the security of the State, friendly relations with foreign States, public order." The laws allow a citizen to seek the punishment of anyone who shows the citizen disrespect "on grounds of religion, race, place of birth, residence, language, caste, sexual orientation, gender identity or community or any other ground whatsoever".

=== Indonesia ===
Indonesia has been a signatory to the International Covenant on Civil and Political Rights since 2006, but has not promulgated comprehensive legislation against hate-speech crimes. Calls for a comprehensive anti-hate speech law and associated educational program have followed statements by a leader of a hard-line Islamic organization that Balinese Hindus were mustering forces to protect the "lascivious Miss World pageant" in "a war against Islam" and that "those who fight on the path of Allah are promised heaven". The statements are said to be an example of similar messages intolerance being preached throughout the country by radical clerics. The National Police ordered all of their personnel to anticipate any potential conflicts in society caused by hate speech. The order is stipulated in the circular signed by the National Police chief General Badrodin Haiti on October 8, 2015.

=== Ireland ===
The Constitution of Ireland guarantees Irish citizens the right "to express freely their convictions and opinions"; however, this right is "subject to public order and morality", mass media "shall not be used to undermine public order or morality or the authority of the State", and "publication or utterance of seditious or indecent matter is an offence". The Prohibition of Incitement to Hatred Act 1989 made it an offence to make, distribute, or broadcast "threatening, abusive or insulting" words, images, or sounds with intent or likelihood to "stir up hatred", where "hatred" is "against a group of persons in the State or elsewhere on account of their race, colour, nationality, religion, ethnic or national origins, membership of the travelling community or sexual orientation". The first conviction was in 2000, of a bus driver who told a Gambian passenger "You should go back to where you came from". This, however, was overturned on appeal due to the strict interpretation of intent to stir up hatred; the judge explained that the bus driver had no intention of "stirring up hate, however racist the comments were". Frustration at the low number of prosecutions (18 by 2011) was attributed to a misconception that the law addressed hate crimes more generally as opposed to incitement in particular. In 2013 the Constitutional Convention considered the constitutional prohibition of blasphemy, and recommended replacing it with a ban on incitement to religious hatred. This was endorsed by the Oireachtas, and in 2017 the Fine Gael-led government planned a referendum for October 2018. The referendum passed, with 64.85% of voters in favour of removing the law, a result which the Irish Times described "uniquely unanimous in recent years".

In 2019, a UN rappourteur told Irish representatives at the Committee on the Elimination of Racial Discrimination, meeting at UN Geneva, to introduce new hate crime legislation to combat the low prosecution rate for offences under the 1989 act, particularly for online hate speech. The rapporteur's points came during a rise in anti-immigrant rhetoric and racist attacks in Ireland and were based on recommendations submitted by the Irish Human Rights and Equality Commission and numerous other civil society organisations. Reforms are supported by the Irish Network Against Racism.

The Criminal Justice (Incitement to Violence or Hatred and Hate Offences) Bill known as the "Hate Crime Bill", prohibiting hate speech or incitement to hate crimes based on protected characteristics, is in its Third Stage at the Seanad, Ireland's upper house, as of June 2023 and the Irish Times reports it is likely to become law in late 2023. It has drawn concern from the Irish Council for Civil Liberties and from across the political spectrum (specifically from Michael McDowell, Rónán Mullen, and People Before Profit), as well as internationally, from business magnate Elon Musk and political activist Donald Trump Jr. Paul Murphy of People Before Profit said the bill created a "thought crime" by its criminalisation of possessing material prepared for circulation where circulation would incite hatred.

=== Japan ===
Japan does not have nationally enforced hate speech laws. Japanese law covers threats and slander, but it "does not apply to hate speech against general groups of people". Japan became a member of the United Nations International Convention on the Elimination of All Forms of Racial Discrimination in 1995. Article 4 of the convention sets forth provisions calling for the criminalization of hate speech but the Japanese government has suspended the provisions, saying actions to spread or promote the idea of racial discrimination have not been taken in Japan to such an extent that legal action is necessary. The Foreign Ministry stated in 2013 that this assessment remained unchanged.

In the same year, following demonstrations, parades, and comments posted on the Internet threatening violence against foreign residents of Japan, especially Koreans, there were concerns that hate speech was a growing problem in Japan. Prime Minister Shinzō Abe and Justice Minister Sadakazu Tanigaki expressed concerns about the increase in hate speech, saying that it "went completely against the nation's dignity", but stopped short of proposing any legal action against protesters.

On 7 October 2013, in a rare ruling on racial discrimination against ethnic Koreans, a Japanese court ordered an anti-Korean group, Zaitokukai, to stop "hate speech" protests against a Korean school in Kyoto and pay the school 12.26 million yen ($126,400 U.S.) in compensation for protests that took place in 2009 and 2010.

In May 2016 Japan passed a law dealing with hate speech. However, it did not ban hate speech and sets no penalty for committing it.

Kawasaki City on July 6, 2020, began enforcing a first of its kind ordinance that penalizes people who repeatedly use hate speech in public spaces, with potential fines of up to 500,000 yen. The new anti-hate speech local law forbids individuals from using means such as megaphones, signs or flyer distribution in public spaces including parks and roads to air hate speech that discriminates against people from foreign countries, or their descendants. The ordinance does not address hate speech outside public areas and online.

=== Jordan ===
Several Jordanian laws seek to prevent the publication or dissemination of material that could provoke strife or hatred:

- Article 6 of Act No. 76 of 2009 regulating publicity and advertising in municipal areas states: (a) The following shall be deemed an infringement of this regulation: (i) The inclusion in publicity or advertisements of material that offends national or religious sentiment or public morals or that is prejudicial to the maintenance of public order. The publicization of ideas based on racial superiority, racial hatred and the instigation of racial discrimination against any person or group constitute punishable offences.
- Article 20 of the Audiovisual Media Act No. 71 of 2002 states: "The licensee shall not broadcast or rebroadcast any material that is likely to provoke confessional and interethnic strife, to undermine national unity or to instigate terrorism, racism or religious intolerance or to damage domestic relations in the Kingdom."
- Article 7 of the Printing and Publications Act No. 8 of 1998 sets out the ethical rules that apply to journalism and the conduct of journalists. It is illegal to publish material likely to stir up hatred or to make propaganda with a view to setting citizens against one another.
- Article 40(a)(iv) of the Print and Publications Act No. 10 of 1993 states that it is prohibited to publish articles that are likely to jeopardize national unity, incite others to commit crimes, stir up hostility, and foment hatred, division and discord between members of society.

=== Kenya ===
In Kenya, hate speech is regulated, but not strictly defined by law, including article 33 of the constitution "and three enabling Acts, such as the National Integration and Cohesion Act, 2008 and Media Act 2007".

=== Malta ===
The Maltese criminal code through Articles 82A-82D prohibits in substance hate speech comprehensively as follows:

82A. (1) Whosoever uses any threatening, abusive or insulting words or behaviour, or displays any written or printed material which is threatening, abusive or insulting, or otherwise conducts himself in such a manner, with intent thereby to stir up violence or racial or religious hatred against another person or group on the grounds of gender, gender identity, sexual orientation, race, colour, language, ethnic origin, religion or belief or political or other opinion or whereby such violence or racial or religious hatred is likely, having regard to all the circumstances, to be stirred up shall, on conviction, be liable to imprisonment for a term from six to eighteen months.

(2) For the purposes of the foregoing sub-article "violence or racial or religious hatred" means violence or racial or religious hatred against a person or against a group of persons in Malta defined by reference to gender, gender identity, sexual orientation, race, colour, language, national or ethnic origin, citizenship, religion or belief or political or other opinion.

82B. Whosoever publicly condones, denies or grossly trivialises genocide, crimes against humanity and war crimes directed against a group of persons or a member of such a group defined by reference to race, colour, religion, citizenship, descent or national or ethnic origin when the conduct is carried out in a manner -

(a) likely to incite to violence or hatred against such a group or a member of such a group;

(b) likely to disturb public order or which is threatening, abusive or insulting, shall, on conviction, be liable to imprisonment for a term from eight months to two years:

Provided that for the purposes of this article "genocide", "crimes against humanity" and "war crimes" shall have the same meaning assigned to them in article 54A (Provisions which transpose the Rome Statute of the International Criminal Court into Maltese Law).

82C.(1) Whosoever publicly condones, denies or grossly trivialises crimes against peace directed against a person or a group of persons defined by reference to gender, gender identity, sexual orientation, race, colour, language, national or ethnic origin, citizenship, religion or belief or political or other opinion when the conduct is carried out in a manner-

(a) likely to incite to violence or hatred against such a person or group; or

(b) likely to disturb public order or which is threatening, abusive or insulting, shall, on conviction, be liable to imprisonment for a term from eight months to two years.

(2) For the purposes of this article a crime against peace means conduct consisting of:

(a) the planning, preparation, initiation or waging of a war of aggression, or a war in violation of international treaties, agreements or assurances;

(b) participation in a common plan or conspiracy for the accomplishment of any of the acts referred to in paragraph (a).

82D. Whosoever aids, abets or instigates any offence under articles 82A to 82C, both inclusive, shall be guilty of an offence and shall be liable on conviction to the punishment laid down for the offence aided, abetted or instigated.

=== Netherlands ===
The Dutch penal code prohibits both insulting a group (article 137c) and inciting hatred, discrimination or violence (article 137d). The definition of the offences as outlined in the penal code is as follows:

- Article 137c: "He who publicly, orally, in writing or graphically, intentionally expresses himself insultingly regarding a group of people because of their race, their religion or their life philosophy, their heterosexual or homosexual orientation or their physical, psychological or mental disability, shall be punished by imprisonment of no more than a year or a monetary penalty of the third category."
- Article 137d: "He who publicly, orally, in writing or graphically, incites hatred against, discrimination of or violent action against person or belongings of people because of their race, their religion or their life philosophy, their gender, their heterosexual or homosexual orientation or their physical, psychological or mental disability, shall be punished by imprisonment of no more than a year or a monetary penalty of the third category."

In January 2009, a court in Amsterdam ordered the prosecution of Geert Wilders, a Dutch Member of Parliament, for breaching articles 137c and 137d. On 23 June 2011, Wilders was acquitted of all charges. In 2016, in a separate case, Wilders was found guilty of both insulting a group and inciting discrimination for promising an audience that he would deliver on their demand for "fewer Moroccans". The group insulting verdict (article 137c) was upheld by the appeals court in 2020. In 2021, the Supreme Court again upheld the conviction.

=== New Zealand ===
New Zealand prohibits "inciting racial disharmony" under the Human Rights Act 1993. Section 61 (Racial Disharmony) makes it unlawful to publish, distribute or broadcast writing, signs, images or sound recordings or use words in a public place or public meeting which are "threatening, abusive, or insulting" or to use words in a public place which are "likely to excite hostility against or bring into contempt any group of persons [...] on the ground of the colour, race, or ethnic or national origins" of that group. Section 131 (Inciting Racial Disharmony) states the penalties for "intent to excite hostility" or bringing into "contempt or ridicule" groups defined in Section 61: up to three months imprisonment or a fine of up to $7,000. From 2017 there were calls to widen hate speech laws to include more groups covering gender, sexuality and religion, but as of 2024 no changes have been made. Under the New Zealand Bill of Rights Act 1990 New Zealanders are free "to seek, receive, and impart information and opinions of any kind in any form."

=== Nigeria ===
In November 2019, the Nigeria Senate reintroduced a bill that seeks to penalise persons found guilty of hate speech. The bill titled "National Commission for the Prohibition of Hate Speeches (Estb. 2019) said "A person who uses, publishes, presents, produces, plays, provides, distributes and/or directs the performance of any material, written and/or visual, which is threatening, abusive or insulting or involves the use of threatening, abusive or insulting words or behaviour, commits an offence, if such person intends thereby to stir up ethnic hatred, or having regard to all the circumstances, ethnic hatred is likely to be stirred up against any person or person from such an ethnic group in Nigeria," a culprit shall be sentenced to not less than a five-year jail term or a fine of not less than N10 million or both

=== Norway ===
Norway prohibits hate speech, and defines it as publicly making statements that threaten or show contempt towards someone or that incite hatred, persecution or contempt for someone due to their skin colour, ethnic origin, homosexual orientation, gender identity, disability, religion or philosophy of life. At the same time, the Norwegian Constitution guarantees the right to free speech, and there has been an ongoing public and judicial debate over where the right balance between the ban against hate speech and the right to free speech lies. Norwegian courts have been restrictive in the use of the hate speech law and only a few persons have been sentenced for violating the law since its implementation in 1970. A public Free Speech committee (1996–1999) recommended to abolish the hate speech law but the Norwegian Parliament instead voted to slightly strengthen it.

=== Poland ===
The hate speech laws in Poland punish those who offend the feelings of the religious by e.g. disturbing a religious ceremony or creating public calumny. They also prohibit public expression that insults a person or a group on account of national, ethnic, racial, or religious affiliation or the lack of a religious affiliation.

=== Romania ===
Article 369 of the Criminal Code, titled 'Incitement to hatred or discrimination', prohibits hate speech directed against a group of persons. The offense carries a punishment of six months to three years' imprisonment, or a fine.

=== Russia ===
According to Article 282 of the Criminal Code, 'Raising hates or hostility, or equally humiliation of human dignity':

Actions aimed at the incitement of hatred or enmity, as well as the humiliation of a person or group of persons on grounds of sex, race, nationality, language, origin, attitude to religion, as well as affiliation to any social group, committed publicly or with the use of media or information and telecommunication networks, including the network "Internet" shall be punished by a fine of 300,000 to 500,000 rubles or the salary or other income for a period of 2 to 3 years, or community service for a period of 1 year to four years, with disqualification to hold certain positions or engage in certain activities up to 3 years, or imprisonment for a term of 2 to 5 years.

=== Serbia ===
The Serbian constitution guarantees freedom of speech, but restricts it in certain cases to protect the rights of others. The criminal charge of "Provoking ethnic, racial and religion based animosity and intolerance" carries a minimum six months prison term and a maximum of ten years.

=== Singapore ===
Singapore has passed numerous laws that prohibit speech that causes disharmony among various religious groups. The Maintenance of Religious Harmony Act is an example of such legislation. The Penal Code criminalizes the deliberate promotion by someone of enmity, hatred or ill will between different racial and religious groups on grounds of race or religion. It also makes it an offence for anyone to deliberately wound the religious or racial feelings of any person.

=== South Africa ===
In South Africa, hate speech (along with incitement to violence and propaganda for war) is specifically excluded from protection of free speech in the Constitution. The Promotion of Equality and Prevention of Unfair Discrimination Act, 2000 contains the following clause:

No person may publish, propagate, advocate or communicate words based on one or more of the prohibited grounds, against any person, that could reasonably be construed to demonstrate a clear intention to be hurtful, be harmful or to incite harm, promote or propagate hatred.

The "prohibited grounds" include race, gender, sex, pregnancy, marital status, ethnic or social origin, colour, sexual orientation, age, disability, religion, conscience, belief, culture, language and birth.

The crime of crimen injuria ("unlawfully, intentionally and seriously impairing the dignity of another") may also be used to prosecute hate speech.

In 2011, a South African court banned Dubula iBhunu (Shoot the Boer), a derogatory song that degraded Afrikaners, on the basis that it violated a South African law prohibiting speech that demonstrates a clear intention to be hurtful, to incite harm, or to promote hatred. however, this was later overturned when the Equality Court ruled in 2022 that the anti-apartheid song did not constitute hate speech and that its lyrics should not be interpreted literally. The court found that AfriForum, the group that brought the case, failed to show that the song promoted hatred or harm, and that the song played a significant role in South African political rhetoric, and that its lyrics should be read in context.

Prevention and Combating of Hate Crimes and Hate Speech Act, 2023 "aims to address racism, racial discrimination, xenophobia and discrimination based on gender, sex, sexual orientation and other issues, by providing an offence of hate crime. It includes controversial provisions that criminalize hate speech in ways that could be used to impermissibly restrict the right to freedom of expression".

=== Spain ===
The Spanish Código Penal has article 510, which forbids ill-intended speech against individuals but has been criticized for its vague interpretation. In addition to this specific offence included in the Special Part of the Criminal Code, there exists a generic aggravating circumstance that may be applied to all offences (including slander and defamation) when they are motivated by hatred or discriminatory bias (article 22.4ª of the Spanish Código Penal). Besides those hate speech crimes, Spain also tackles hate speech through non criminal laws, such as article 23 of the Law 19/2007, against violence, racism, xenophobia and intolerance in sports.

The organisation tasked with enforcing hate speech related crimes is the Committee on the Elimination of Racial Discrimination (Comité para la Eliminación de la Discriminación Racial). This committee is directed by the International Convention on the Elimination of All Forms of Racial Discrimination (Convención Internacional sobre la Eliminación de todas las Formas de Discriminación Racial). In an article published in 2011, it showed concerns about the persistence of stereotypical and unhealthy racial attitudes towards maghrebi and Latino communities living in Spain. The committee has urged the Government to take action by creating a national strategy in order to combat racism, xenophobia and their social consequences.

=== Sweden ===
Sweden prohibits hate speech, and defines it as publicly making statements that threaten or express disrespect for an ethnic group or similar group regarding their race, skin colour, national or ethnic origin, faith, or sexual orientation. The law does not prohibit a pertinent and responsible debate (en saklig och vederhäftig diskussion), nor statements made in a completely private sphere. There are constitutional restrictions pertaining to which acts are criminalized, as well as limits set by the European Convention on Human Rights. The crime is called hets mot folkgrupp in Swedish, which directly translates to Incitement (of hatred/violence) towards population group. Since 2024 the crime also covers genocide denial and denial of some other international crimes.

The sexual orientation provision, added in 2002, was used to convict Pentecostal pastor Åke Green of hate speech based on a 2003 sermon. His conviction was later overturned.

=== Switzerland ===
In Switzerland public discrimination or invoking to rancor against persons or a group of people because of their race or ethnicity is penalized with a term of imprisonment of up to three years or a fine. In 1934, the authorities of the Basel-Stadt canton criminalized anti-Jewish hate speech, e.g. the accusation of ritual murders, mostly in reaction against a pro-Nazi antisemitic group and newspaper, the Volksbund.

In Geneva, a new constitution article banning the use of hate symbols, emblems, and other hateful images was passed in June 2024 in reaction to their use by populist movements.

=== Taiwan ===
According to Taipei Times, "Taiwan does not have laws regulating hate speech like those in Canada and other countries". Taiwan law criminalizes defamation against a specific person, but has no law against offensive speech directed against groups of people.

=== Turkey ===
Turkey addresses hate speech primarily through Articles 216 and 122 of the Turkish Penal Code (TCK No. 5237, effective 2005).

Article 216 punishes persons who publicly incite hatred or hostility between different sections of the public based on differences in social class, race, religion, religious sect, or regional origin, where such incitement poses a clear and present danger to public order, with imprisonment from one to three years.

Publicly degrading people based on these differences carries a penalty of six months to one year imprisonment, as does degrading religious values of a group in a manner likely to disturb public peace.

Article 122 criminalizes discrimination motivated by hatred based on language, race, nationality, color, gender, disability, political thought, philosophical belief, religion, or religious sect, particularly when it denies access to goods or services available to the public, such as housing or employment.

=== Ukraine ===
I. "Constitution of Ukraine" :

The most important body of law in Ukraine, the Constitution of Ukraine, guarantees protection against hate crimes

Article 24: "There can be no privileges or restrictions on the grounds of race, color of the skin, political, religious or other beliefs, sex, ethnic or social origin, property status, place of residence, language or other grounds."

Article 37: "The establishment and activity of political parties and public associations are prohibited if their program goals or actions are aimed at ...the propaganda of war and of violence, the incitement of inter-ethnic, racial, or religious enmity, and the encroachment on human rights and freedoms and the health of the population".

II. "CRIMINAL CODEX OF UKRAINE":

In Ukraine, all criminal punishments for crimes committed under the law are required to be registered in only one body of law, the "Criminal Codex of Ukraine".

In many articles of the criminal law discussing general crimes, the penalties may be increased if in the circumstances of the crimes in question they are also found to be hate crimes. There are also separate articles on punishment for hate crimes.

"CRIMINAL CODEX OF UKRAINE" :

Article 161: "Violations of equality of citizens depending on their race, nationality, religious beliefs, disability and other grounds

1. Intentional acts aimed at incitement to national, racial or religious hatred and violence, to humiliate national honor and dignity, or to repulse citizens' feelings due to their religious beliefs,

as well as direct or indirect restriction of rights or the establishment of direct or indirect privileges citizens on the grounds of race, color, political, religious or other beliefs, sex, disability, ethnic or social origin, property status, place of residence, language or other grounds"(Maximum criminal sentence of up to 8 years in prison)

Article 300 : "Importation, manufacture or distribution of works promoting a cult of violence and cruelty, racial, national or religious intolerance and discrimination." (Maximum criminal sentence of up to 5 years in prison)

=== United Arab Emirates ===
In the UAE insulting Islam and certain types of hate speech are punishable by imprisonment and/or fines.

=== United Kingdom ===
The United Kingdom, being a devolved union of four different nations (England, Northern Ireland, Scotland, and Wales) includes various different laws relating to hate speech.

England and Wales

In England and Wales, statutes which criminalize hate-speech are often found under the Public Order Act 1986 and subsequent amendments made to said act, under both the Criminal Justice and Public Order Act 1994, the Racial and Religious Hatred Act 2006, and the Criminal Justice and Immigration Act 2008.

The Football Offences Act 1991 (amended by the Football (Offences and Disorder) Act 1999) also prohibits indecent or racialist chanting at designated football matches.

Outside of the criminal law, police officers in England and Wales are also given the ability to record ‘non-crime hate incidents’, in which the police are granted the ability to keep records on instances of non-criminal behaviour (including speech), where an incident or alleged incident, is perceived by a person other than the subject to be motivated - wholly or partly - by hostility or prejudice towards persons with a particular characteristic.

Protected characteristics include a persons race or perceived race, religion or perceived religion, sexual orientation or perceived sexual orientation, disability or perceived disability and or transgender identity or perceived transgender identity.

Several statutes criminalize hate speech against several categories of people. The laws forbid communication that is hateful, threatening, or abusive, and targets a person on account of disability, ethnic or national origin, nationality (including citizenship), race, religion, sexual orientation, or skin colour. The penalties for hate speech include fines, imprisonment, or both.

Scotland

In Scotland, laws relating to hate-speech can be found under the Hate Crime and Public Order (Scotland) Act 2021 (which came into force on 1 April 2024), as well as various other provisions.

Legislation against Sectarian hate in Scotland, which is aimed principally at football matches, does not criminalise jokes about people's beliefs, nor outlaw "harsh" comment about their religious faith.

=== United States ===
The United States does not have hate speech laws, because the U.S. Supreme Court has repeatedly ruled that laws criminalizing hate speech violate the guarantee to freedom of speech contained in the First Amendment to the U.S. Constitution. There are categories of speech that are not protected by the First Amendment, such as speech that calls for imminent violence upon a person or group.

Proponents of hate speech legislation in the United States have argued that freedom of speech undermines the 14th Amendment's purpose of guaranteeing equal protection under the law.
