= Utoro =

District in Kyoto Prefecture, Japan

- District
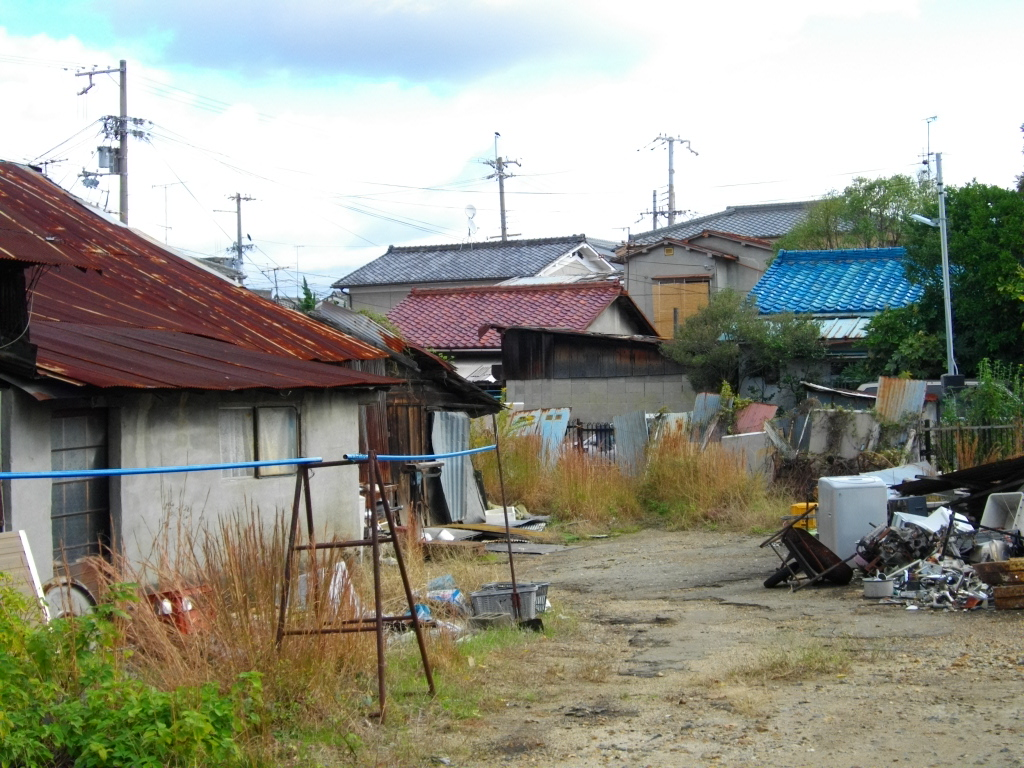
- The district in 2009, before the significant renovation
- Etymology: "A hollow"
- Interactive map of Utoro
- Coordinates: 34°52′52″N 135°46′21″E
- Country: Japan
- Prefecture: Kyoto
- City: Uji

Population (2021)
  - Total: 90 (Korean)
- Website: www.utoro.jp/en/ (in English)

Utoro (Japanese: ウトロ地区, Hepburn: Utoro Chiku; Korean: 우토로) is a district in Uji, Kyoto Prefecture, Japan. The district has historically been populated by Zainichi Koreans (Koreans who arrived during the Japanese colonial period and their descendants) ever since they were compelled to work in difficult conditions in the area in 1943.

When Korea was liberated at the end of World War II in 1945, many Koreans across Japan could not afford the trip back to Korea or were apprehensive of returning to the significant instability and poverty on the newly divided peninsula. Around 1,300 people stayed illegally in the district as squatters. Despite poor conditions, Koreans from across Japan moved into the village, as it was somewhere where they could support each other.

In the 1960s, the company Nissan Shatai owned the land. It tried numerous tactics to have the villagers leave, but these efforts were rebuffed. In 1987, Nissan Shatai transferred ownership of the land to the private company Western Japan Development (西日本殖産). The company sued to evict the villagers in the late 1980s. The villagers eventually lost the case after a decade-long legal battle, although they continued to resist eviction efforts. With assistance from Japanese, international, and South Korean advocates, in 2010 and 2011 they purchased land in the district, which made them legal occupants for the first time.

Living conditions improved significantly over the following decade. Two new apartment blocks have since been constructed for the villagers. In 2022, the Utoro Peace Memorial Museum (ウトロ平和祈念館; 우토로평화기념관), a museum covering the history of the village, was constructed in the district. Doubt has been expressed that the district will continue to be a Korean enclave, as the population of Koreans living there has aged and the Uji government owns the housing on the lot. By 2021, the Korean population in the area was 90.

== Etymology ==
The district's name, which in Japanese is unusually written in katakana with no corresponding kanji, is often assumed to be of Korean origin. However, it is derived from a local colloquial term for "a hollow".

== History ==
=== Background ===
From 1910 to 1945, Korea was a colony of the Empire of Japan. During this time, Japan banned aspects of traditional Korean culture, mandated education be in Japanese only, and encouraged Koreans to adopt Japanese names. Prior to World War II, immigration from Korea to Japan was largely voluntary. However, when wartime labor shortages began, Japan forcefully mobilized Koreans to support their war effort. Between 1939 and 1945, around 700,000–800,000 Koreans were moved to Japan. By 1945, the number of Koreans in Japan peaked at around two million.

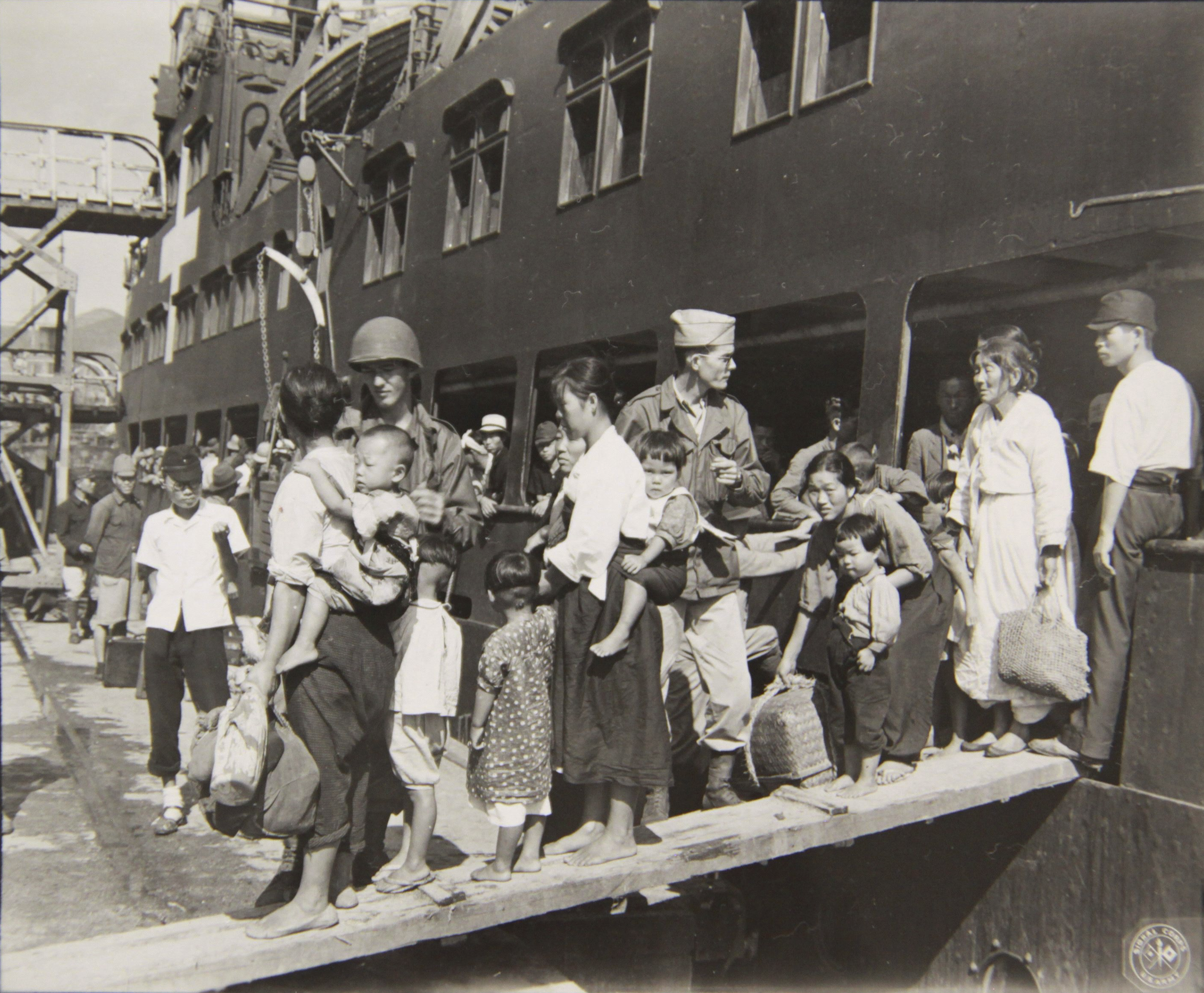
Korean returnees arriving in Busan (October 12, 1945)

Following the surrender of Japan, the majority of ethnic Koreans (1 to 1.4 million) returned to the peninsula. The ones who stayed in Japan did so for a variety of reasons. Some were apprehensive of returning to the poor conditions and political instability on the peninsula, others could not afford the journey back to the peninsula, and some even had successful careers. Koreans who had already somewhat assimilated into Japanese culture, with Japanese spouses or Japanese-speaking children, were incentivized to stay there.

Koreans who remained in Japan were targeted for harassment and violence by Japanese people in the period immediately after the surrender. A police report from Yamaguchi Prefecture recorded statements from the public that said "Japan lost the war because of you Koreans; [now] go back to Korea immediately" and "all Koreans must be killed". In Chōshi, Japanese policemen fired upon and killed three Koreans who had been on their way to welcome the local arrival of U.S. military forces. These incidents frightened Koreans, and caused them to form support organizations and self-segregate for their own protection.

Although Koreans in Japan had experienced discrimination prior to World War II, they had still been Japanese citizens. However, after the war, the Japanese government gradually stripped them of significant rights and benefits. In December 1945, they lost their right to vote. In 1947, the Alien Registration Ordinance formally stripped them of their citizenship, rendering them stateless. Employment policies were enacted that excluded Koreans from "Japanese jobs". This drove many Koreans to pursue work in informal, marginalized, or illegal sectors.

=== Foundation of Utoro ===
In 1941, the Japanese government planned to build an air field near Utoro. It recruited Koreans to do this task. The recruited Koreans were mainly tenant farmers from Gyeongsang Province. They were first moved to the area in 1943. These laborers lived in workers' quarters in the area, but the buildings were of poor condition and highly cramped; each of the makeshift shacks often housed seven or eight families.

The airfield was unfinished when the war ended in 1945. Afterwards, workers were given no compensation or means to return to Korea. In addition, conditions on the peninsula were also difficult due to the division of Korea around that time. Stuck, around 1,300 Koreans stayed in the area as squatters, as they had no legal ownership of the land or the properties on it. They lived in poor conditions; poverty, unemployment, and a lack of plumbing were widespread in the homes. Residents used non-flush toilets, which gave the district an unpleasant smell.

Other Koreans in Japan also congregated in the area, which became an ethnic enclave. A month after Japan's surrender, they established a school, the Chōren Kuze Branch School (affiliated with the Korean organization Chōren). They made a point to use Korean as the medium of instruction, as they felt that Japanese colonization had deprived them of their Korean identity. However, Korean schools were made to close in 1949. Students who moved to Japanese schools were subject to bullying and discrimination. As a result, school attendance deteriorated. In addition, a number of the older residents had never attended school in either Korea or Japan. Some residents remained illiterate, which caused difficulties in their negotiations with the owners of the land and the various governments. Illiteracy also contributed to the prevalence of trust-based verbal contracts among residents during exchanges of goods and services.

In 1951, a local newspaper reported there were around 60 families in the area. In September 1953, the area was hit by Typhoon Tess, which resulted in severe flooding.

=== Conflict over eviction ===
Around the 1960s, the land was owned by the Nissan affiliate Nissan Shatai. The company held several negotiations with the settlers, sometimes via the North Korea–aligned organization Chongryon, to have them leave, but no conclusions were reached. The settlers applied to the Uji government for access to the public water supply because the wells they had been using were salty, but the government deferred the decision to Nissan Shatai. Nissan Shatai rejected this on the grounds that it would confirm the occupancy of the squatters. The conflict over drinking water became a key issue over the following decades.

In 1984 and 1985, Nissan Shatai offered several deals to the Head of the Area Council, Hirayama Masuo (Korean name Ho Ch'ang-gu; 호창구; 許昌九), to evict and resettle the residents, but these offers were rebuffed. In 1986, Nissan Shatai proposed that the land be sold to a company which Hirayama could set up, with current residents being able to buy land from the company. Hirayama accepted the offer, and the deal went through in March 1987. Nissan Shatai communicated its approval for the residents' water access to the Uji government. Residents were reportedly happy to begin receiving running water in April 1988, but did not know how it had been obtained.

Hirayama never told the other residents about the deal that he had struck. He opened a company called Western Japan Development (西日本殖産; 서일본식산) with himself as director. He petitioned residents to buy land from him, but he was rebuffed. In June 1988, after hearing rumors of the deal's terms, some residents looked up the owner of the land and found that Hirayama had been lying to them. After being confronted, Hirayama resigned from the company and disappeared. The new owners of Western Japan Development filed eviction notices to the residents on December 13, 1988. These notices were ignored, which led to the company filing a lawsuit against the residents in the Kyoto District Court. In February 1989, demolition workers approached the site, but the residents physically blocked their work. The following month, the residents had their first trial.

Around this time, they also formed a support group called the Association to Protect Utoro (ウトロを守る会; 우토로를 지키는 모임), with an initial membership of 70 and support from 200 other people. A number of these members were ethnic Japanese people, largely neighbors from the area. A demonstration from this group, with around 700 people in attendance, was held at a local Nissan Shatai factory on November 5. The group alleged that Nissan Shatai had struck a secret deal with Hirayama, and demanded that Nissan Shatai purchase the land back from Western Japan Development. Nissan Shatai declined to. A series of hearings on Western Japan Development's lawsuits was held from 1991 to 1992, but negotiations were strained and dragged on.

Meanwhile, the residents worked to bring the issue to national and international attention. Beginning on September 7, 1991, resident Yumi Lee (이유미) embarked on a three-month speaking tour of the United States, in which she covered not only Utoro, but also the issues facing Zainichi Koreans as a whole. She lectured at a number of universities, including Harvard, Yale, Columbia, and others. Lee's public relations campaign led to a significant growth in interest in the issue; Utoro was covered by major news organizations, including The New York Times, CNN, and Time.

The story received significant attention. Some interpreted Utoro as a symbol of post-war Japan's denialism and systemic discrimination against Zainichi Koreans. In 1993, Harvard students protested the eviction of Utoro's residents at the Japanese consulate in Boston. Villagers pooled $25,000 to buy a full-page ad in The New York Times. The ad was purchased at a discount rate facilitated by Herb Gunther, head of an American advertising company Public Media Center, who had seen the protestors while on a business trip in Kyoto. It ran on March 1, 1993, and requested that the American public apply pressure to Nissan Shatai to either repurchase the land or compensate the villagers for their wartime labor. Public Media Center received over 11,000 letters of support. That year, the Los Angeles Times published an article on the topic called "An Eviction Unworthy of the Japanese". After a broadcast about the village, the Korean-American radio station KCB-FM received more than 18,000 letters and signatures of support for Utoro. Japanese Americans also assisted in the campaign. Kana Shimasaki, a pastor in Honolulu, actively petitioned for the cause, and told the Los Angeles Times that:

It's shameful that the only way to get Japan to correct a wrong is to bring it to the outside world. As a Japanese citizen I am embarrassed.

The issue gained some traction in Germany as well. Five representatives of the village visited the country in 1991 and gave talks, and a number of German youths visited at the invitation of the Japanese German Forum.

However, in 1998, the Kyoto District Court ruled against the villagers. Appeals were filed to the Osaka High Court, but these were dismissed. Residents then appealed to the Supreme Court of Japan, but their eviction was again upheld in November 2000. They continued to refuse to leave, and rebuffed efforts to forcefully evict them.

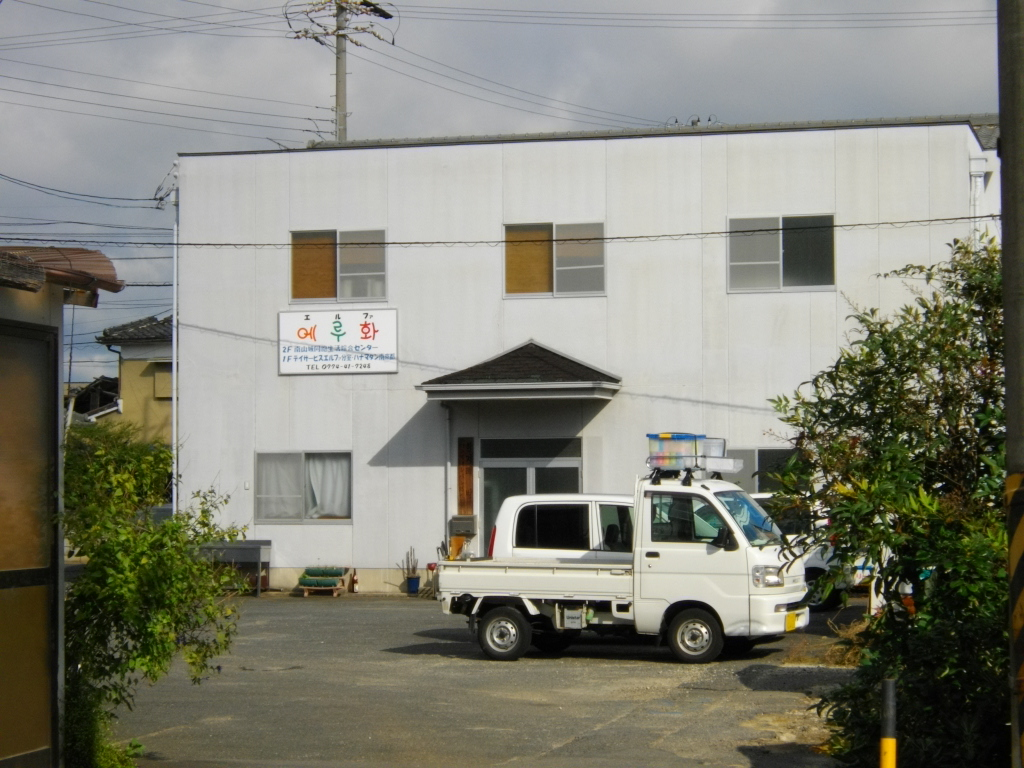
The building that houses ELFA (2009)

In August 2001, the United Nations Committee on Economic, Social and Cultural Rights acknowledged the Utoro issue within the context of systemic discrimination in Japan against ethnic minorities, especially Korean people. In June 2002, residents founded a volunteer support organization for the elderly called ELFA (エルファ; 에루화). The organization was assisted by both the North Korea-aligned Chongryon and South Korea-aligned Mindan.

=== Support from Japanese people ===
The villagers also garnered the attention and assistance of numerous Japanese people, especially their neighbors. In 1988, they held their first meeting, with Saitō Masaki (斎藤正樹) writing the first newsletter for the group. Saitō also later helped organize legal support for the residents, prepare the residents' statement to the U.N, and negotiate with the Uji government. Neighbors signed petitions and donated money to Utoro's causes. One of the residents, Tagawa Akiko, had been living at the village since the 1980s. She later explained why she had campaigned to help the Korean residents obtain water access:

Twenty-seven years ago, I was too shocked to see my [Korean] friend that grew up in Utoro had no access to a water supply. I thought I should do something.

When legal efforts stalled, Japanese supporters laid out a "Community Building Action Plan". In addition, the National Council of Churches in Japan and the Human Rights Committee of the National Council of Churches in Korea worked together to support the villagers. A professor at the University of Tsukuba held a study session on the history of the village in 1989.

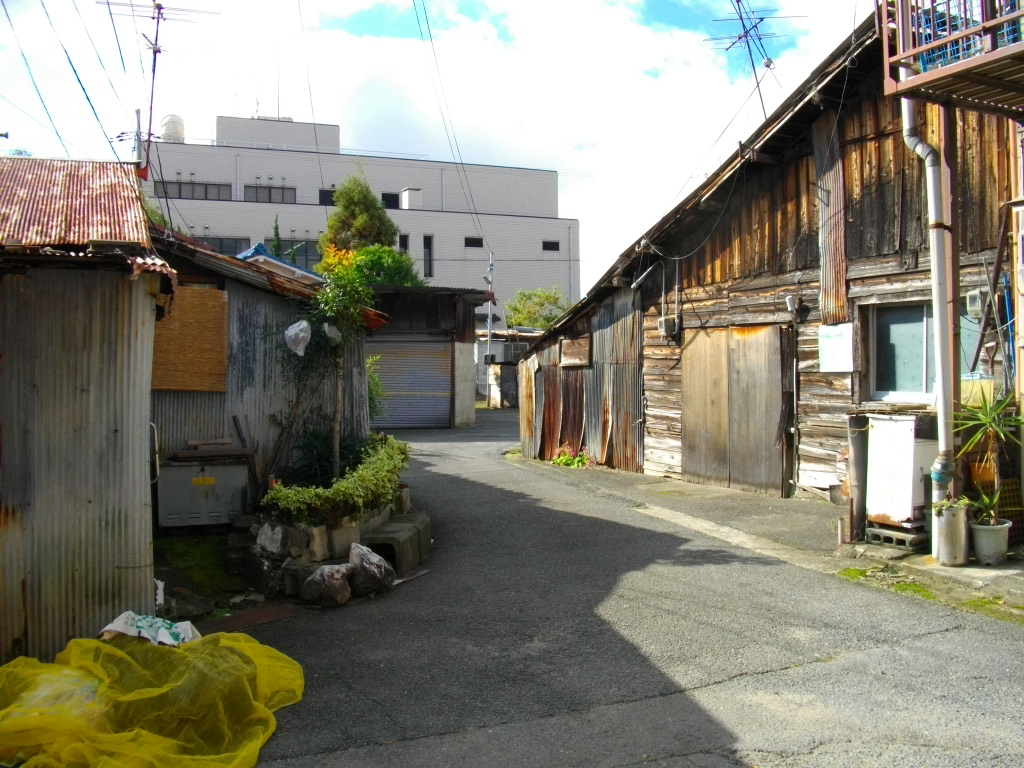
A view of the village (2009)

=== Breakthrough in fundraising and negotiations ===
The citizens and government of South Korea ended up playing a significant role in improving the conditions in Utoro. The first report on Utoro appeared in The Hankyoreh in 1990. The issue reached national attention by 2004.

Numerous awareness and fundraising campaigns were held in South Korea, and have even continued through the 2010s. In 2005, South Korean TV networks ran a series of Utoro specials on the 60th anniversary of the end of World War II, and called for donations. South Korean celebrities, such as Yoo Jae-suk, have donated to Utoro on a number of occasions. In December 2016, the National Memorial Museum of Forced Mobilization under Japanese Occupation in Busan, South Korea, held an exhibition on Utoro, and appealed for more donations.

In 2005, Ban Ki-moon, the U.N. Secretary General and South Korean Minister of Foreign Affairs, promised the residents aid if private donations were insufficient for the purchase of the land. Moon Jae-in, then the Chief Presidential Secretary under Roh Moo-hyun and later the President of South Korea, played a significant role in arranging support for Utoro. In 2007, nine residents spoke to the South Korean National Assembly.

Around the mid-2000s, the population of the village had dropped to 230, as young people left and did not return. In 2008, there were 65 households and 203 Korean residents.

In 2007, Utoro residents managed to raise over 380 million yen ($3,200,000) to purchase their land, from private donors and the South Korean government. This year marked the first time that residents were not under threat of eviction, although it would be several more years until they were legal occupants. In May 2010, they purchased 2,700 m^{2} (29,000 ft^{2}) of land for 120 million yen. The following February, the South Korean government purchased another 3,800 m^{2} (41,000 ft^{2}) for 180 million yen on behalf of the residents.

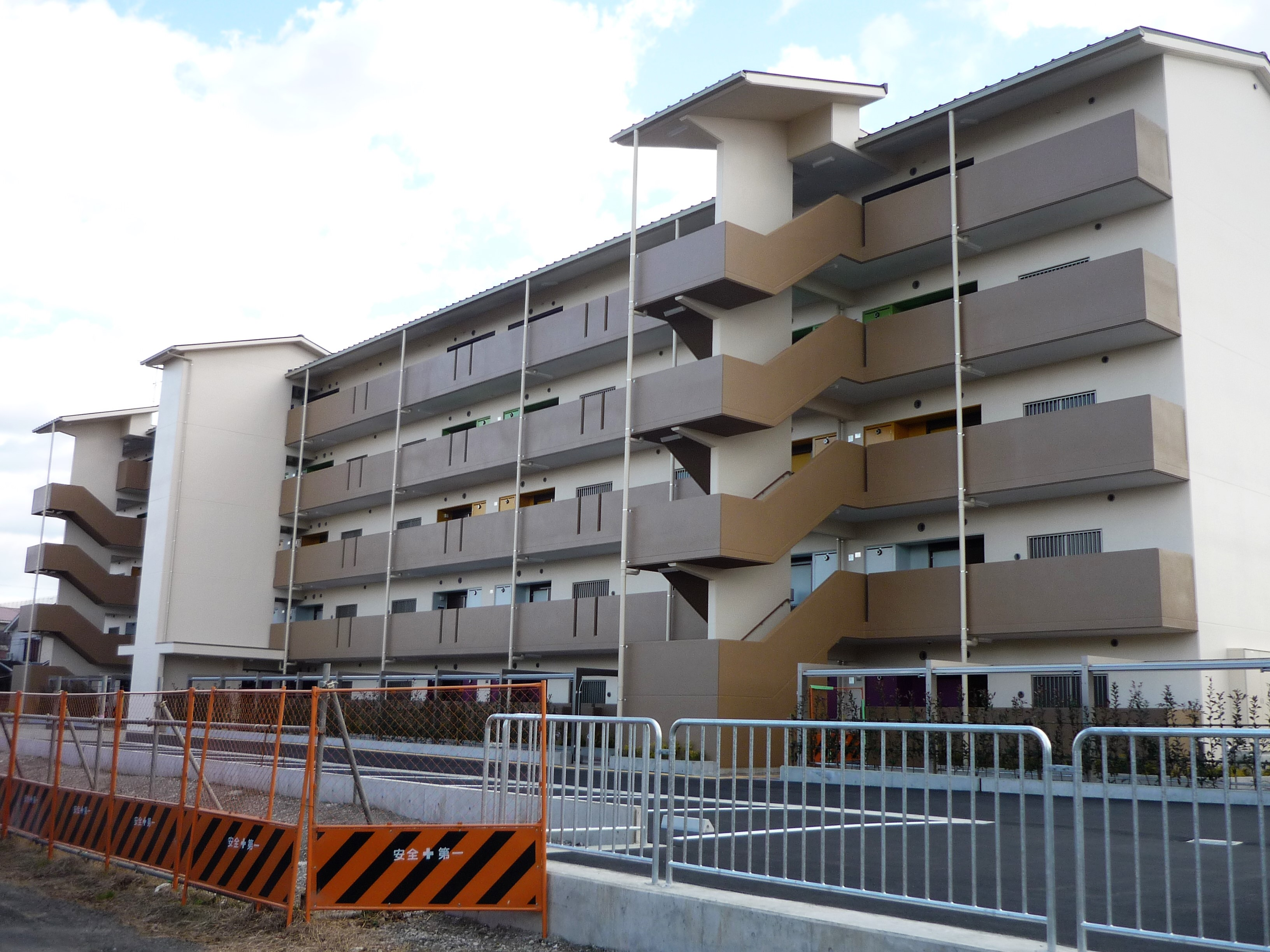
The first new apartment building, around when residents were beginning to move in (January 2, 2018)

Around that time, negotiations with the Japanese government began to progress after decades of stalling. In December 2007, the Japanese government founded the Council for Improving Living Environment of Utoro District. In 2008, the Uji government conducted a census in the area for the first time, and found that 179 people from 71 households were living there. In February 2011, the residents and Council announced they had agreed on a plan to construct medical facilities and flood protection infrastructure in the area. In January 2012, the residents and the Council agreed on a plan to improve conditions in the area. The Uji government would fund the preparation of new public housing. Much of the funding for initial improvements was raised by a South Korean non-profit. In 2016, the city began tearing down old houses. Construction on an apartment building for 40 families began that year. The building was completed in January 2018, and the residents moved in. One more building for 12 households was completed in 2023.

By 2021, there were around 90 residents in the district. Saitō Masaki predicted that, as the new buildings were public housing owned by the government, the proportion of ethnic Koreans living in the district would gradually decrease over time.

== Utoro Peace Memorial Museum ==
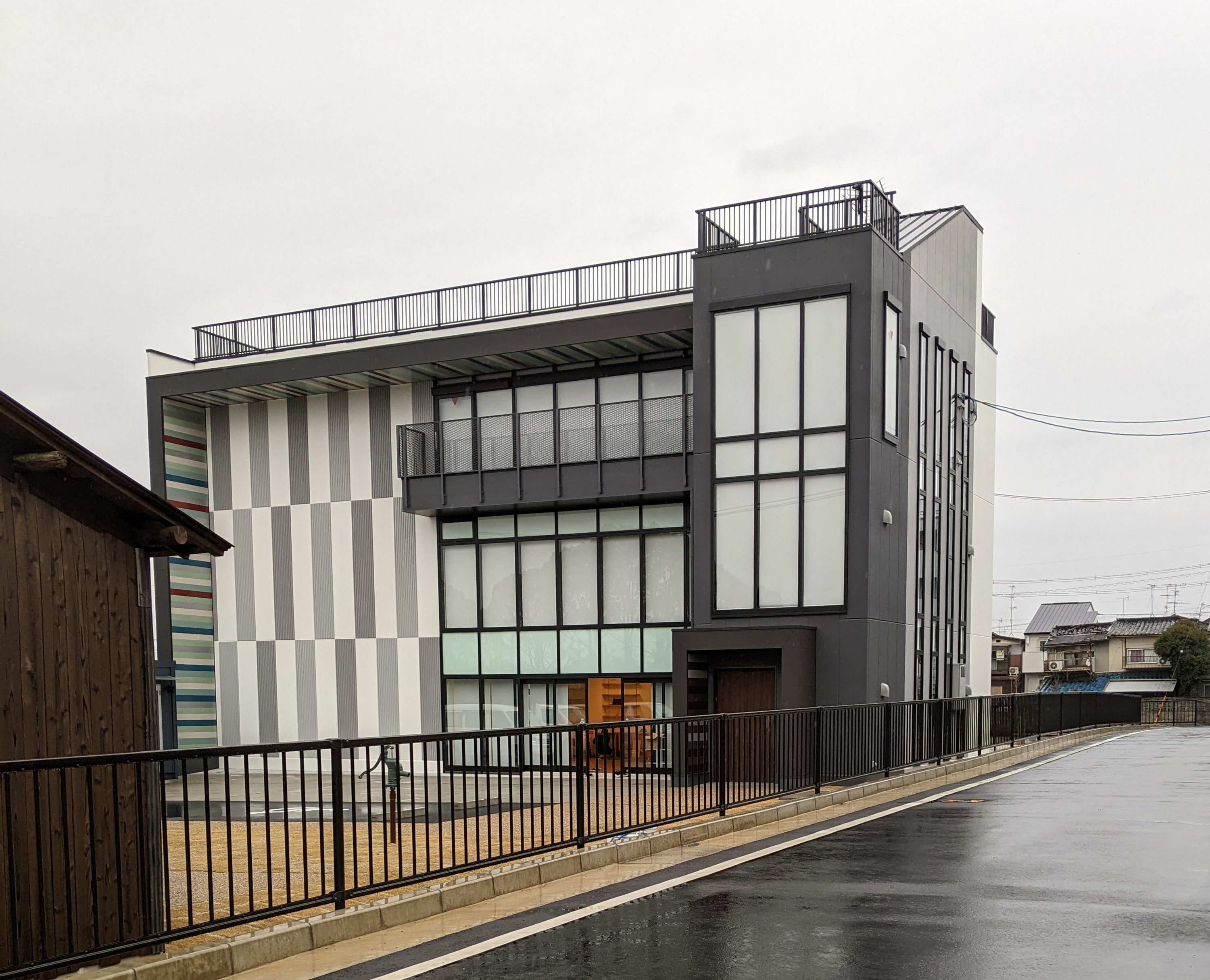
The Utoro Peace Memorial Museum (March 2022)

In 2018, the villagers created another committee to campaign for the creation of a museum about the village's history.

The Utoro Peace Memorial Museum (ウトロ平和祈念館; 우토로평화기념관) was built through a mix of private donations and assistance from the South Korean government. The South Korean government assisted in the process as part of their effort to celebrate the 100th anniversary of the founding of the Provisional Government of the Republic of Korea.

In July 2021, the last of the original bunkhouses was torn down. It had been built in 1943, and by then was severely decayed. It had apparently not been used since 1986. Residents saw this as a significant milestone in the renovation process. They intentionally kept a part of the old building, to be moved into the museum, which was to begin construction in fall of that year.

On April 30, 2022, the museum opened in the district. An opening ceremony was held, with a traditional Korean music and dance ceremony. It has three floors and a total floor space of 450 m^{2} (4,800 ft^{2}). The director is Akiko Tagawa, a Japanese woman who had lived in the district for decades. There is a café on the first floor. The building cost around 200 million yen (US$1.8 million).

== Anti-Korean sentiment ==
On December 14, 2008, the right-wing politician Makoto Sakurai and members of his group Zaitokukai (full name of organization translates to "Association of Citizens against the Special Privileges of the Zainichi [Koreans]") held a demonstration at Utoro, in which they demanded that Utoro residents leave the area. Sakurai has called for the expulsion of Koreans from Japan, as he believed "they are social parasites". The group also distributed flyers with threatening messages to the villagers.

=== 2021 arson incident ===
On August 30, 2021, Arimoto Shōgo (有本匠吾), a 23-year-old unemployed Japanese person, set fire to an empty building in the district. The fire spread to other buildings, damaging property in the area. Arimoto falsely believed that residents were still living on the land illegally, which had not been true for around ten years by that point. Arimoto had also previously set fire to the building of an ethnic Korean organization in Aichi, as well as to a Korean school in Nagoya.

The act was determined to be a hate crime. Arimoto's stated motivation was "antagonistic feelings towards Koreans"; he also acknowledged that he had been influenced by far right internet posts in Japan, which often target Korean people. This sparked a debate over hate speech laws in Japan. The mayor of Uji, Atsuko Matsumura, condemned the attack, saying it and similar acts "should never be forgiven, no matter what".

== See also ==
- Ikuno Korea Town – a Koreatown in Osaka
- Ōkubo, Tokyo – community of Koreans, including many recent immigrants, in Tokyo
- Category:Korean diaspora communities
