= Attempt (disambiguation) =

An attempt is when a criminal has an intent to commit a crime, but does not actually carry it out it for unintended reasons. It may also refer to:

- Attempt (German penal code), applicable law in Germany
- A try
- An assault
- An attack
