= Holger Voss =

German Internet user

Holger Voss is a German Internet user who was sued in January 2003 for a sarcastic comment pertaining to the September 11, 2001 attacks in an Internet discussion forum, a case that attracted nationwide attention in Germany.

Voss's comment was originally made on June 21, 2002, during a discussion relating to an article in German net magazine Telepolis; it ended with the statement "If you find sarcasm, please reuse it" ("Wer Sarkasmus findet, der/die möge ihn bitte weiterverwenden"). Voss posted his comment in response to another poster's comment that endorsed the 9/11 attacks. Voss also added a postscript to his comment, in which he remarked that he had added that original poster and another forum user to a blocklist, since he (Voss) ostensibly took their comments at face value and accused them of Volksverhetzung. (The original poster in turn accused Voss of being serious.)

Voss was subsequently charged, following an anonymous report to the police; he received a penalty order for an amount of 1500 euros, which he appealed and was summoned to a court hearing on January 8, 2003, by the Münster County Court. Voss was acquitted of the charge of assentingly accepting that an unbiased reader might interpret his statements as an approval of the September 11, 2001 terrorist attacks on the same day (cf. §140 Criminal Code); during the course of the trial, it was also revealed that his disclaimer of the posting as sarcasm had been left out of the legal documents that were provided to the prosecutor by the law enforcement agencies.

The case raised considerable attention in Germany, both for its free-speech implications and its implications regarding the liability of Internet forum providers for statements made by their members. Voss also claimed that the Internet service provider T-Online saved his dynamic IP address, which was turned over to law enforcement agencies without a judge's order for several months in disagreement with German laws, which allow the saving of IP addresses for as long as is necessary for billing, and he initiated legal action in a separate case, which he won on January 25, 2006.

On October 26, 2006, the Federal Court of Justice decided to refuse the complaint from T-Online, whereby the judgement from January 25, 2006 became law.
