= Trial of Geert Wilders =

Trial of Geert Wilders may refer to:

- First trial of Geert Wilders, trial in 2010-2011
- Second trial of Geert Wilders, trial in 2016-2021
