= Hanshin =

Hanshin (阪神, Japanese pronunciation: [haꜜɰ̃.ɕiɴ], lit. 'Ōsaka-Kōbe'), derived from the second kanji from Osaka (大阪) and the first kanji from Kobe (神戸) (but in on-reading instead of kun-reading), refers generally to Osaka, Kobe, and the surrounding area in the Kansai region of Japan.

In the context of a region of Hyōgo Prefecture, the term is used to refer to the 8 small municipalities (Amagasaki, Ashiya, Inagawa, Itami, Kawanishi, Nishinomiya, Sanda and Takarazuka) located close to the northern coast of Osaka Bay between the two large cities of Kobe and Osaka. In some contexts, the eastern Higashinada and Nada wards of Kobe and Nishiyodagawa Ward of Osaka are also included.

The name Hanshin may also refer to:

- Hanshin Department Store, a chain of department stores based in Osaka
- Hanshin Electric Railway, a railway that links Osaka and Kobe
  - Hanshin Main Line, a line operated by the railway
- Hanshin Expressway, a network of tolled highways surrounding Osaka, Kobe, and Kyoto
- Hanshin Industrial Region, the industrial region encompassing Osaka and Kobe metropolitan areas
- Hanshin Racecourse, a horse racetrack in Takarazuka, Hyogo
- Hanshin Tigers, a professional baseball team in Nishinomiya, Hyogo
- Hanshin: Half-God, manga by Moto Hagio

== See also ==
- Great Hanshin earthquake, 1995 earthquake centered in southern Hyogo
- Hanshin Education Incident, 1948 incident in which Korean ethnic schools in Japan were closed down
- Keihanshin, a macro-region including Kyōto (Kei-) and Hanshin
- Hanshinkan Modernism, the cultural and arts movement in the region during the early 20th century
