= Hanshin Education Incident =

1948 protests in Japan

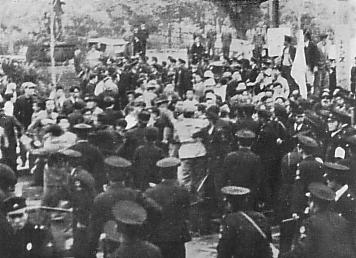
- Policemen at the protests in Osaka
- Native name: 阪神教育事件
- Date: 10 April 1948 – 24 April 1948
- Location: Hyogo Prefecture and Osaka Prefecture, Japan
- Cause: Closure of Korean ethnic schools in Japan
- Deaths: 1 Korean casualty

The Hanshin Education Incident (Japanese: 阪神教育事件) occurred in April 1948, when Japanese authorities, acting under the directions of the government of the United States and the Japanese Ministry of Education, closed down private Korean ethnic schools operating in Japan. This caused protests across Japan that ranged in size to up to 20,000 civilians. The majority of the protests were concentrated on the streets of Osaka and Kobe, the capital of Hyogo Prefecture, where civilians protested the closure of the Korean schools. Hanshin, the location of many of the demonstrations, is the region that lies between Osaka and Kobe.

The protestors stormed the Hyogo Prefecture Office Building, and held the governor, the prefectural police chief, and officers of the Allied Occupation as hostages in an attempt to coerce them to rescind their decision to close the Korean ethnic school. While an agreement was briefly agreed upon, the Japanese and the U.S. government broke the deal, declared a state of emergency in Hyogo, and arrested thousands of Koreans living throughout the city.

The schools had been set up by Chōren, an organization for pre-1945 Koreans arrivals to Japan (also known as Zainichi), to preserve Korean heritage through Korean language education. However, the fear that communists had infiltrated the schools and were attempting to disrupt the U.S. occupation of the region prompted the closure of the schools.

In the 1950s, Koreans living in Japan were able to preserve the existence of Korean ethnic schools through privatization, distancing themselves from the Japanese Communist Party and by establishing Chongryon and Mindan, Zainichi organizations which are supported by the North Korean and South Korean governments, respectively.

== Background ==
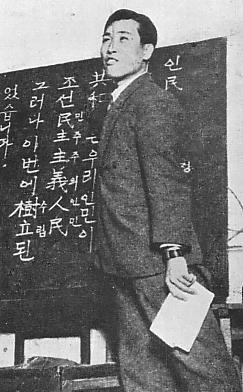
Teacher at a Korean ethnic school in Japan (1945–1949)

=== Japanese occupation of Korea ===
Korea went through a period of Japanese occupation from 1910 until 1945, starting with the Japan–Korea Treaty of 1910, which integrated Korea into the Japanese Empire as a protectorate. In 1938, the Japanese government adopted a policy that aimed to assimilate Koreans by replacing Korean language education with Japanese language education. By 1943, speaking Korean was forbidden. Despite resistance, many Koreans also adopted Japanese names, in hopes of improving their opportunities and avoiding discrimination. Those who did not comply with the policy were forbidden from attending school, collecting wartime rations or working for the government.

=== Creation of Korean ethnic schools ===
Following World War II, the Japanese Empire collapsed and Korea gained independence. There was a significant Korean population (approximately 725,000) living in Japan at the time, and the majority were not able to practice Korean traditions under Japanese Imperial rule. After independence, Korean ethnic schools (known as minzoku kyoiku) were created in Japan to cater to the educational needs of the Korean minority that remained in Japan. The movement to create Korean schools was created by Chōren ("League of Koreans in Japan"), an organization that represented the interests of Koreans living in Japan. The League's aim was to preserve Korean culture among the minority inhabiting Japan. As many of the children who attended the schools were not fluent in Korean, the schools' mandate was to reconnect Korean children with their ethnic language and to facilitate a smooth transition, should they decide to return to Korea.

=== The School Education Law ===
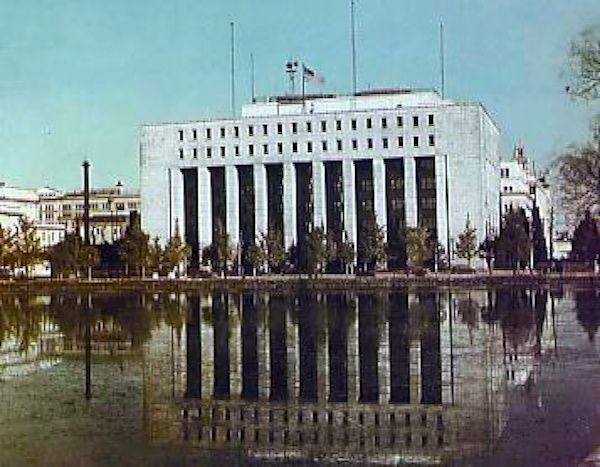
Dai-Ichi Seimei Building, the former headquarters for General Douglas MacArthur during the occupation of Japan following World War II

Chōren was left-leaning in character, and allied itself with the Japanese Communist Party. This drew the ire of both the U.S. and Japan.

In 1947, the School Education Law was enacted in Japan under the instruction of the Supreme Commander for the Allied Forces Douglas MacArthur. This required all schools in Japan to be accredited by the state and made Japanese the only official language of instruction. Korean could only be used for extracurricular activities. Since the ethnic schools did not comply with these regulations, General MacArthur instructed that all the Korean schools be shut down. As a result of the 1947 School Education Law, the Governor of Hyogo Prefecture ordered all Korean ethnic schools to close down on April 10, 1948. Thirteen days later, on April 23, Japanese police and military used force to close down schools by physically removing students and nailing the doors shut. The police and military then blocked the entrance to Nada and Higashi schools to prevent students from entering.

== Protests ==
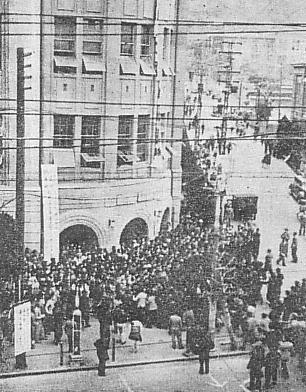
Protests during the Hanshin Education Incident

=== Osaka Prefecture ===
The protests were held all over Japan, with one of the biggest occurring in Osaka, where over 7,000 were in attendance. On April 23, 1948, a crowd gathered outside of Osaka Castle, where sixteen people were chosen to be representatives to negotiate with the Governor about the closure of the ethnic schools, and to discuss the general attitudes towards Koreans and Korean education in Osaka. When no agreements were reached, nearly 4,000 protestors forcefully entered the central office of the Osaka Prefecture Government, destroying office equipment and cutting phone lines. The Governor of Osaka, with whom they had hoped to negotiate, escaped the office with the assistance of a police escort. Over the next few days, the protests grew in number to between 20,000 and 40,000 protestors. These protests, which were mostly centralized at Otemae Park in Osaka, were dispersed by the military. A Korean teenager named Kim T'ae-il, the only recorded casualty from the Hanshin Education Incident, was killed when Japanese police were shooting among the crowd of protestors.

=== Hyogo Prefecture ===
Hyogo Prefecture was also a centre for the protests. On the morning of April 24, almost 3,000 Koreans and Japanese Communist Party members protested in front of the Hyogo Prefecture Government Building in an attempt to get the government to re-open the schools and release the 70 Koreans who had been previously arrested. About 100 Korean protestors broke into the reception of the Governor's office, where they destroyed furniture and cut off the phone lines, which limited communication with the police and military. The protestors also broke down the wall to the Governor's office, where the protestors kept the Governor, the Mayor of Kobe and the Chief of Police hostage until the release of the arrested Korean protestors was guaranteed. The 70 prisoners were released, and a verbal guarantee of the retraction of the school closure order was made.

That evening, a state of emergency was declared in Hyogo, and the U.S. Military took over the security situation. The promises that the Governor had made became null and void, as the Governor made them while under duress. On April 25, the US military police, together with the Japanese police, arrested thousands more of the protestors and alleged leaders of the League of Koreans. The state of emergency was lifted the next day and, by April 29, 1,732 people had been arrested. Seven people were tried by the US Military Commission and sentenced to hard labor for 10 to 15 years because they perpetrated "harmful acts against the safety and occupation purpose of occupation troops in Japan."

== Immediate aftermath ==
=== Temporary closure and privatization of Korean schools ===
In Hyogo Prefecture, the government closed the Korean ethnic schools and forced students to transfer to the local Japanese schools. These actions resulted in the closure of most of the 337 schools that were administered by the League of Koreans. By 1952, 157 Korean ethnic schools were still in operation in Japan. As a result of the protests, the Eighth Army General Officer Robert Eichelberger ordered Kobe police to go on a "Korean Hunt" that aimed to arrest anyone who looked Korean.

Following the end of the Korean War, the Japanese Koreans approached the issue of ethnic schools by working within the Japanese legal system. This approach was successful, as the Koreans living in Japan moved away from the Japanese Communist Party, and instead started to fund the ethnic Korean schools privately, or with the support from Chongryon and Mindan, Zainichi organizations supported by the North Korean and South Korean governments, respectively.

=== Split from the Japanese Communist Party ===
During the Hanshin protests in Osaka-Kobe, the Zainichi civil rights movement relied on support from the Japan Communist Party, but with the end of the Korean War, ethnic Korean activists moved away from an anti-Japanese stance and attempted to depoliticize their movement and sever ties with the Communist Party in Japan. Not all ethnic Koreans aligned with the communist ideology of the movement and a split within the Zainichi movement occurred when the South Korean Association in Japan (Mindan) was founded in 1948.

== Long-term effects ==
=== Discrimination ===
The Hanshin Education Incident is part of a larger struggle for civil rights, autonomy and acceptance of Koreans living in Japan. The Zainichi (Koreans residing in Japan) had been discriminated against based on their ethnicity during Japanese Imperial Rule. Following the defeat and Allied occupation of Japan, ethnic Koreans were deemed to be aliens in Japan by the 1947 Alien Registration Law. This law required all those living in Japan who were ethnically Korean to register for alien status. In 1950, the Nationality Law made it so that Koreans were only allowed to gain citizenship if their father was Japanese. Those born to Japanese mothers and Korean fathers were stripped of their Japanese citizenship. Successive anti-Korean laws impeded ethnic Koreans' ability to seek employment in professions that were deemed to be “Japanese professions," which included the majority of public and private sector work. As a result, a large number of Koreans began to work in alcohol production and scrap recycling, or engage in criminal activity. Many Japanese Koreans graduates were not able to find work due to their Korean heritage. A 1955 law forced all Koreans to be fingerprinted, as they were considered to be foreigners living in Japan. Up to the early 1980s, Koreans living in Japan faced unequal treatment in regards to public services, as many Japanese Korean seniors were denied pensions on the basis of their Korean ethnicity. These policies led to a growth in Korean resentment towards the Allied occupation and the post-war Japanese government.

=== Establishment of Chongryon and Mindan ===
In 1955, the General Association of Korean Residents in Japan (Chongryon) was founded, and became the primary organization for Koreans aligned with North Korea. This Association had close ties to the newly established Communist government of North Korea which financially and ideologically supported the preservation of Korean ethnic schools. Mindan is the other major organization for Koreans living in Japan, but is primarily aligned with South Korea. Both organisations currently maintain multiple educational institutions in Japan such as Chongryon's Chōsen gakkō. Both Mindan and Chongryon engage and promote Korean nationalism in Japan. North Korea supports Chongryon in return for the US$100 million that Chongryon sends annually to North Korea.

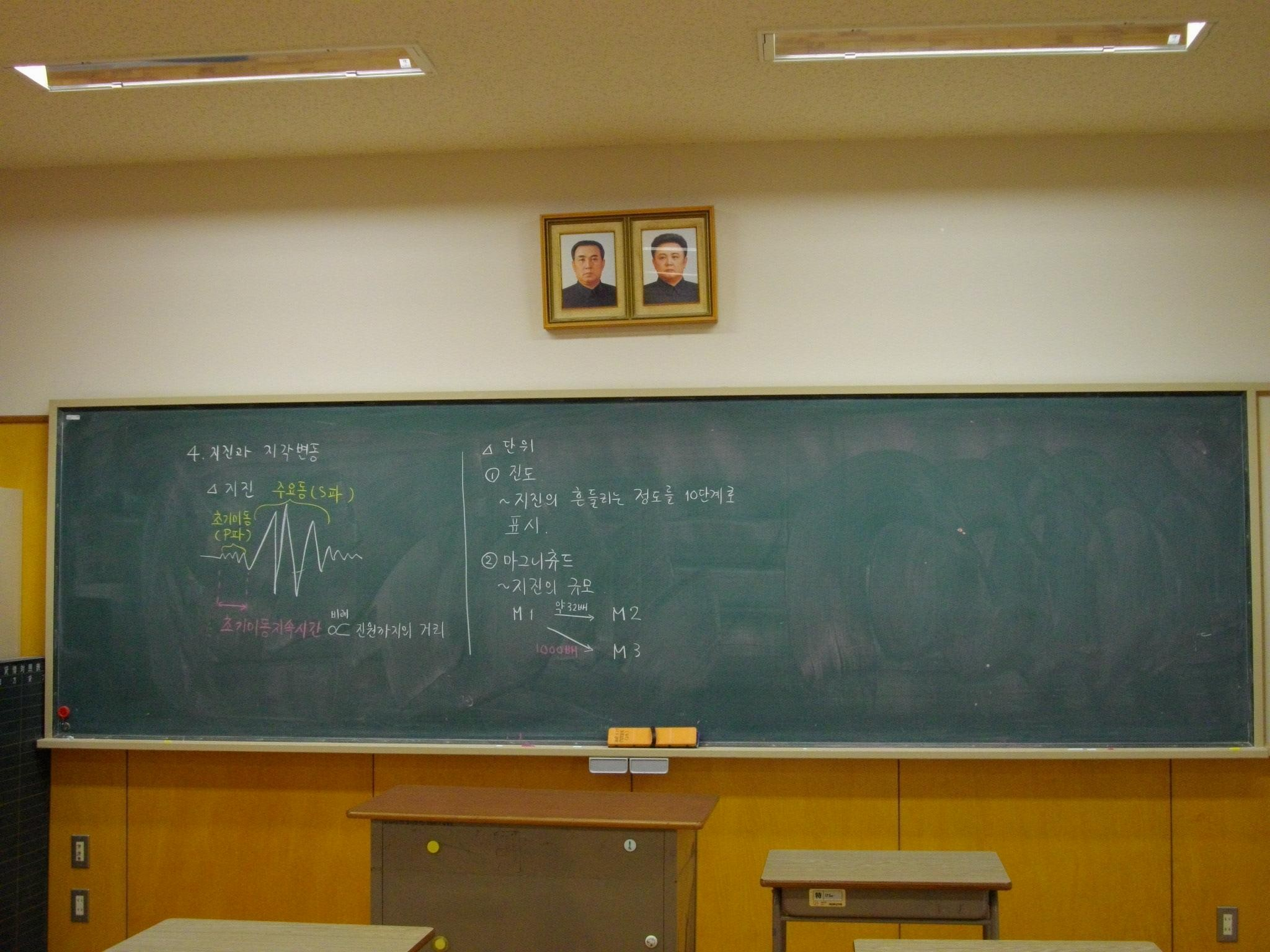
Chongryon school classroom displaying portraits of Kim Il Sung and Kim Jong Il

=== Reforms ===
In the 1980s the situation began to improve for ethnic Koreans in Japan. There were educational reforms in Japan which allowed Korean schools to maintain their status as private educational institutions, with some in operation up to this day. By 1987, naturalized Koreans living in Japan became able to use their Korean name, rather than a Japanese name. When Japan signed the United Nations Refugee Convention, Chongryon Koreans received permanent residency status too and were granted the right to visit their families in North Korea. Nearly the entire population of ethnic Koreans living in Japan had been granted permanent residency by 1991. The law that required the fingerprinting of permanent residents was terminated in 1993.

== Recent history ==
=== 1990s ===
North Korea's engagement with Chongryon continued on into the 1990s. At the time, Japan was going through a recession and there was a revival in Japanese nationalism that perceived Chongryon as a national security threat. The rise of Japanese neo-nationalism caused a renewed deterioration of relations with the Koreans living in Japan. The Japanese government started to monitor the Chongryon affiliated schools more closely, including their educational curriculum and their financial ties, as they had been sending monetary aid to North Korea. By 1999, 90% of Korean children in Japan received their education in a Japanese school.

=== Present ===
After Shinzo Abe was elected Prime Minister in 2012, his government decided that Chongryon schools’ freedom of operation had to be curtailed by cancelling subsidies that improved affordability for the pro-Chongryon ethnic Koreans. In 2017, the District Court of Osaka ruled that the attempted cuts to school subsidies by the Abe government should be retracted. One year later, the Japanese High Court upheld the government's decision to restrict educational subsidies for students attending Chongryon schools.
