= Principle of ubiquity =

Place of crime

In German criminal code, principle of ubiquity, (Ubiquitätsprinzip, Section 9 §1 Alt. 3 and 4 of the Strafgesetzbuch) states that the crime is considered to have occurred in the place of the action of the perpetrator or in the place where the harm occurred.

Its parallel in the United States law is the combination of the objective territoriality principle (the effects doctrine) and subjective territoriality principle.

For example, if a person sends a poison cookie from Germany to a United States resident and the latter one suffers, then both Germany and the United States have a jurisdiction over the case.
