= Competition (German penal code) =

Relationship between different paragraph of German criminal law

Competition in German Penal Code is the assessment of multiple crimes committed by the same person in the context of a legal process.

A distinction is made between joint offenses (§ 52 StGB) and distinct offenses (§ 53 StGB). Joint offenses are cases in which the same person commits multiple different or identical crimes through the same act, while distinct offenses are cases where different or identical crimes are committed over multiple distinct acts.

== Joint and distinct offenses ==
The purpose of the competition provisions is to ensure that, where several violations of the criminal law occur at the same time, a penalty is imposed that is appropriate to the severity of each violation and not simply to add up the penalties for the individual offenses.

The Criminal Code provides two procedures for developing a punishment from the sentencing range for each individual criminal offense: joint offense under § 52 StGB and distinct offenses under § 53 StGB (Differenzierungsprinzip). Each joint offense is based on a single action and each distinct offense is based on multiple actions.

In the case of a joint offense, which is not superseded by specialty, subsidiarity, or consumption, an Einheitsstrafe is imposed that is based on the most serious offense committed (Einschluss- oder Absorptionsprinzip). In the case of distinct offenses, in which several acts violate several laws and these are not superseded by a concurrent or prior offense, a Gesamtstrafe is formed from the individual penalties provided for in the law. The most serious sanction (Einsatzstrafe) is used as a base and increased by the fewer penalties, whereby the total penalty must be less than the sum of the possible individual penalties (Strafrabatt).

The distinction between a joint offense and a distinct offense is based on the consideration that the offender is more culpable if multiple offenses are committed (Verschärfungs- oder Asperationsprinzip). A subsequent formation of a total sentence between two offenses is still possible if the offender committed the later offense before being convicted of the earlier offense because the (non-existent) conviction did not serve as a warning to the offender. Therefore, the granting of a lower sentence is justified. The subsequent formation of a total sentence is only possible if the sentence from the judgment for the earlier offense has not yet been carried out. In juvenile criminal law, an Einheitsstrafe is always imposed (§ 31 I JGG).

== Single and distinct actions ==
A single action is present when there is either an “action in the natural sense”, a “natural unity of action”, or a “legal unity of action”. Otherwise, there is a plurality of actions.

=== Action in the natural sense ===
The same act of the offender that violates several criminal offenses or one criminal offense several times is described as an act in the natural sense if the offender makes a natural decision to commit the act and exercises the underlying will. There must be a single act of will. Such an instance would be battery and the damage to the clothes of a murder victim.

=== Natural unity of action ===
A natural unity of action can exist through combining several non-overlapping acts against different legal interests, if the behaviors are driven by a unified will and there is a close spatial and temporal proximity between them so that they appear as a unified event and do not affect the body, the life or the freedom of the victim. This is justified through the joint and coherent nature of the entire event from the perspective of an objective third party. An example would be a perpetrator breaking into several luxury vehicles in quick succession in order to steal navigation devices from the respective interiors. While these thefts are in themselves independent, they are carried out due to a unified intent on the part of the perpetrator and in close spatial and temporal proximity, therefore creating a natural unity of action between them. As such, there is only an increase in the quantity of offenses committed, but not in the intensity of the crime.

=== Legal unity of action ===
In a legal unit of action, several natural actions are linked to form a unit due to factors of the law.

A legal unit of action in the narrow sense exists in the case of multi-act offenses, continuing offenses, and linked offenses. Multi-act offenses are characterized by the fact that the acts carried out are partially identical to two or more criminal offenses. If someone wants to rob someone else, the violence used is relevant to the robbery offense on the one hand; but also to the battery inflicted on the other (partial identity). In the next act, the desired item is then taken away (theft component within the robbery offense). Continuing offenses link together to form a legal unit of action insofar as they provide the "unlawful framework" for another criminal offense. Classic offenses are deprivation of liberty (§ 239 StGB) and trespassing (§ 123 StGB). These offenses are unified offenses with varying degrees of mutual reference to another criminal offense. Example: A enters B's house without permission (trespassing) to attack and injure him when he returns home (bodily harm). In the same way, A could attack and injure B in front of his front door and then enter his house without permission.

In 1994, the Federal Court of Justice broke with the theory of the "Fortsetzungszusammenhangs" that was being discussed at the time in the context of the legal unity of action. On May 3, 1994, the Grand Senate for Criminal Matters of the Federal Court of Justice decided to abolish this legal concept. Until then, the continuation context had been constructed in such a way that several similar acts, each of which met all the requirements of a criminal offense and was directed against the same legal interest, were legally combined into a single assessment unit if the acts were based on an overall intent in their essential features (according to time, place and type of commission). In the case of threats against a person, it was also required that the act was directed against the same person. Parts of scholarship and some courts required that the overall intent had to have been formed at the latest when the first partial act was completed, which led to considerable problems regarding evidence as well as the legal evaluation, which led to judicial inconsistencies.

== Competition between laws ==
=== Competition within distinct actions ===
==== Speciality ====
The more specific law takes precedence. This is the case if crime contains all characteristics of another and, in addition, at least one further characteristic that captures the facts more precisely. This is particularly the case in the case of qualification, privilege, and special offenses. These are more specific than the basic offense, while compound offenses are more specific than the elements of which they are composed (e.g. § 244 I No. 3 StGB (burglary) is more specific than § 242 (simple theft); § 249 StGB (robbery) is more specific than § 240 StGB (coercion) and§ 242 (theft).

==== Subsidiarity ====
Subsidiary is only applied (as a backup) if no other offense applies. If the offense that is to be applied with priority applies, the subsidiary offense takes precedence. A distinction is made between formal subsidiarity: e.g. § 246 I, § 248b I StGB, where the alternative application is prescribed by law, and material subsidiarity, where the priority arises from the systematic nature of the offense. Therefore, attempt takes precedence over completion, participation takes precedence over perpetration, incitement over accessory, Injury over endangerment, and concrete over abstract endangerment.

==== Consumption ====
Such an offense is typically committed when another is committed and is also punished by the punishment for the primary offense. For example, the unauthorized use of a vehicle (§ 248b StGB) consumes the theft or embezzlement (§ 242, § 246 StGB)of the petrol and oil consumed. Burglary under § 244 I No. 3 StGB consumes trespassing under § 123 of the Criminal Code.

=== Competition between distinct acts ===
In the case of distinct actions, individual offenses may be subtracted from the total sentence as a prior or subsequent offense: The criminal liability of a previous act is subtracted if its unlawful content is also included in the later act (e.g. key theft is included as a co-punished predicate offense in the case of vehicle theft; § 30 II StGB is subtracted in cases of attempted or completed serious offenses) A subsequent offense is subtracted if there is no distinct wrongdoing after accounting for the main offense.

== Literature ==
- Claus Roxin: Strafrecht. Allgemeiner Teil. Band II: Besondere Erscheinungsformen der Straftat. Beck, München 2003. ISBN 3-406-43868-7, S. 795–882.
- Johannes Wessels, Werner Beulke: Strafrecht. Allgemeiner Teil: Die Straftat und ihr Aufbau. 37. Auflage. Müller, Heidelberg 2007. ISBN 978-3-8114-9221-9.
