= First trial of Geert Wilders =

Prosecution of a Dutch politician in 2010–2011

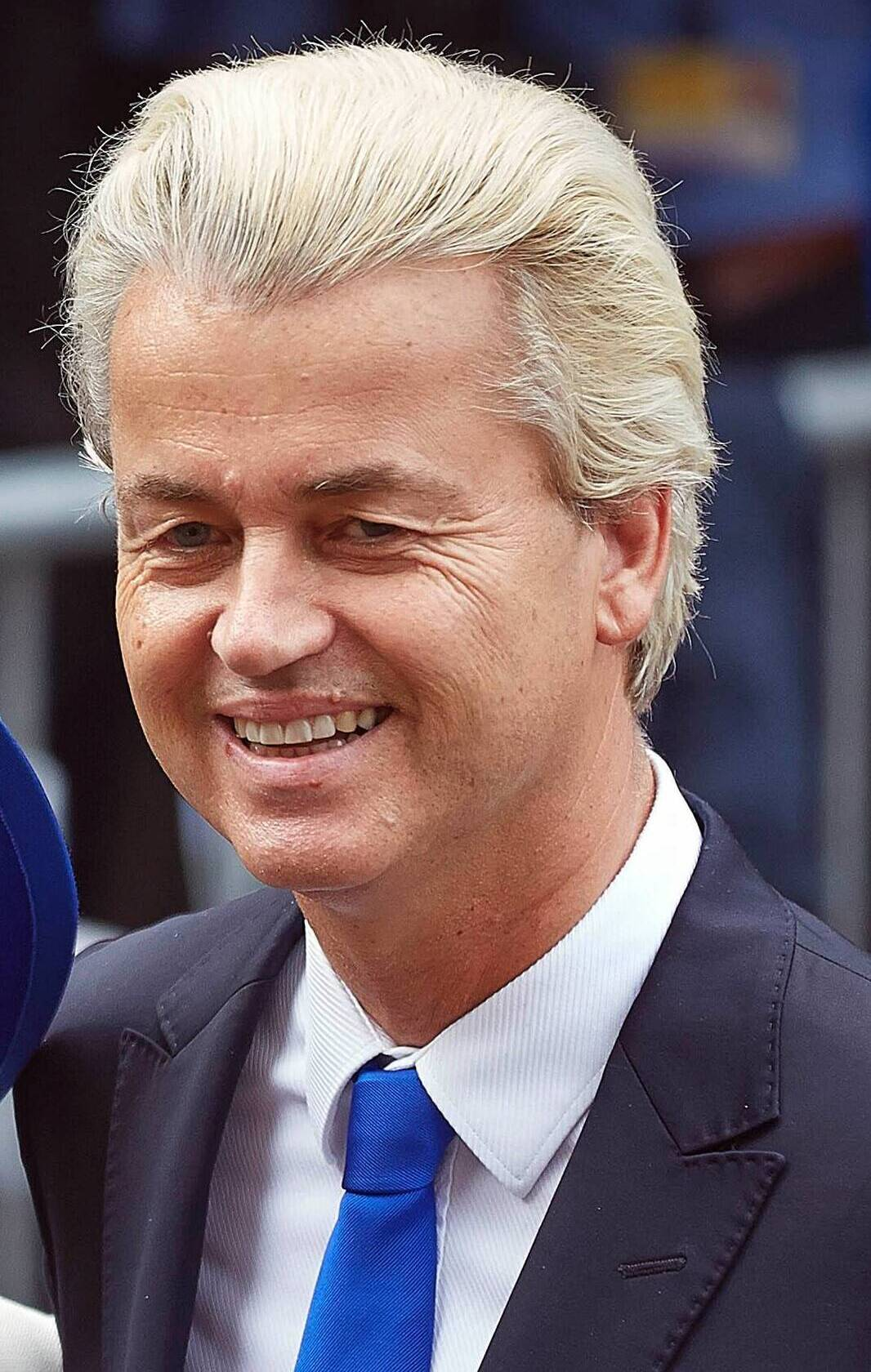

The trial of Geert Wilders, a member of the House of Representatives of the Netherlands, took place in the Netherlands in 2010 and 2011. Wilders was accused of criminally insulting religious and ethnic groups and inciting hatred and discrimination. He was found not guilty in June 2011.

The leader of the Party for Freedom, Wilders has been the source of great controversy in the Netherlands and abroad for his criticism of Islam and what he describes as the Islamization of the Netherlands. At his trial, he faced five counts of criminal offenses. The first charge was of criminally insulting Muslims because of their religion. The remaining four charges pertained to incitement of hatred and discrimination of Muslims, Moroccans, and other non-Western immigrants because of their race or ethnicity. These charges stemmed from articles Wilders had written between 2006 and 2008, as well as his short film Fitna. These statements included a call for a ban on the Quran, warnings against an "Islamic invasion," and a "tsunami of Islamization." He also labeled Islam a fascist religion, described Dutch-Moroccan youths as violent, and compared the Quran with Hitler's Mein Kampf. He has also referred to Mohammed as "the devil."

The judges in the first trial were removed due to perceived bias against Wilders, so a retrial began in February 2011. The Dutch Public Prosecution Service, after initially refusing to prosecute Wilders because it did not consider his statements illegal, was ordered by a court of appeal to prosecute him nonetheless. During the process, they argued that Wilders should be acquitted on all counts.

On 23 June 2011, Wilders was acquitted of all charges, with Judge Marcel van Oosten noting that his statements, although "gross and denigrating," had not given rise to hatred against Muslims, and as such were "acceptable within the context of public debate." Van Oosten also said, however, that Wilders's statements were on the edge of legal acceptability.

== Background ==
According to Article 71 of the Dutch Constitution, as an MP, Wilders has immunity with regard to anything he says in or writes to parliament. However, this protection does not extend to opinions expressed outside of parliament, allowing for prosecution based on his criticism of Islam. The possibility that Wilders could be prosecuted became clear between 2007 and 2010, when protests against alleged insults and incitement to hatred resulted in his criminal prosecution by the district attorney in Amsterdam. On 3 February 2010, the Amsterdam court ruled itself to be competent on the charges against Wilders.

Some of his public comments, as well as some of the content of Wilders' film Fitna, have been protested by agencies such as the Dutch anti-discrimination group The Netherlands Shows True Colours (Dutch: Nederland Bekent Kleur). On 15 August 2007, a representative of the public prosecution service in Amsterdam declared that dozens of reports filed against Wilders were being considered.

Attempts to prosecute Wilders under Dutch anti-hate speech laws in June 2008 were dropped, with the public prosecution stating that Wilders' comments contributed to the debate on Islam in Dutch society and had been made outside parliament. The office released a statement reading: "That comments are hurtful and offensive for a large number of Muslims does not mean that they are punishable. Freedom of expression fulfils an essential role in public debate in a democratic society. That means that offensive comments can be made in a political debate."

== Prosecution ==
=== Decision to try ===
The plaintiffs (Nederland Bekent Kleur, organisations of Turkish, Moroccan and Antillean people in the Netherlands, and an organization of mosques) appealed against the prosecution's decision to not pursue the case and on 21 January 2009, a three-judge court of appeal ordered the public prosecutor to try Wilders. Their statement said that "[i]n a democratic system, hate speech is considered so serious that it is in the general interest to... draw a clear line" and that "the court also considers appropriate criminal prosecution for insulting Muslim worshippers because of comparisons between Islam and Nazism made by Wilders". If convicted, he could have been sentenced for up to 16 months of jail time or a fine of €9866.67. His lawyer Bram Moszkowicz tried to have the appeal overturned at the Supreme Court of the Netherlands, but the Supreme Court's Procurator General decided he would not hear the case.

On 4 December 2009, Wilders was ordered to appear before the court on 20 January 2010 to defend himself against the charges of group insult of Muslims, fomenting hate and discrimination against Muslims because of their religion, and fomenting hate and discrimination against non-Western foreigners or Moroccans because of their race. On 11 January 2010, the Dutch public prosecution service brought additional charges against him, charging him with hatred against Moroccans and non-Western immigrants.

On 13 January 2010, the Amsterdam court rejected, after a closed pretrial hearing, submissions by Wilders that one of the charges against him should be dropped or reduced. He argued that he had only criticized Islam and not its adherents, and that the charge of insulting Muslims as a group should not stand. His lawyer Moszkowicz petitioned judges to drop the charge of insulting Muslims as a group, which he said would have little chance of winning a conviction. He cited a 2009 Dutch Supreme Court ruling that found insulting a religion is not the same as insulting followers of that religion, and not punishable under the current hate speech laws. The judge said that the indictment only put into practice an earlier court ruling that he should stand trial and that the defense had not put forward any new evidence to overturn the ruling.

==== Charges ====
In total, Wilders was charged with the following five counts:

1. Group insult
2. Inciting hatred against Muslims because of their religion
3. Inciting discrimination against Muslims because of their religion
4. Inciting hatred against non-western immigrants and Moroccans because of their race
5. Inciting discrimination against non-western immigrants and Moroccans because of their race

The first charge is based on article 137c of the Dutch criminal code, and the rest are based on article 137d, both concerning hate speech.

=== First trial ===
Court proceedings began on 20 January 2010, with Wilders accused of discrimination on the basis of religion and spreading hate. On the eve of his trial, Wilders told journalists he expected to be acquitted, saying, "I have done nothing wrong." After receiving the summons, he commented that he considered the prosecution as "a political trial." He also announced his intention to call various experts to act as witnesses.

When the trial resumed on 3 February, the judges decided who would be allowed to testify as witnesses. Wilders's desired witness list consisted of various experts on both the law and Islam, including university professors, radical imams, and Mohammed Bouyeri, the man who murdered filmmaker Theo van Gogh. Other individuals on the list included Afshin Ellian, a Dutch-Iranian professor at Leiden University; Hans Jansen, a Dutch scholar of Islam; Wafa Sultan, a Syrian American physician; Raphael Israeli, a Moroccan-Israeli professor at the Hebrew University of Jerusalem; Andrew G. Bostom, an American professor at Alpert Medical School of Brown University; Robert Spencer, an American author and blogger; and Ayatollahs Ahmad Jannati and Mohammad Yazdii, members of the Iranian Guardian Council.

The court rejected 15 of Wilders's 18 desired witnesses, ruling that Bouyeri and other Muslim extremists would not be allowed to testify in the case. The court accepted only the three Islam experts whom Wilders had called, rejecting the lawyers and Islamic extremists. The court also rejected the plea by Wilders's lawyer to transfer the case to the Supreme Court due to Wilders status as an MP. The court overruled this objection against its jurisdiction. "Parliamentary immunity does not extend to what a public representative says or writes outside of parliamentary gatherings." said Jan Moors, one of the judges at the Amsterdam court.

During the trial it became clear that the prosecutors were arguing for Wilders to be acquitted on all five counts.

On 22 October 2010, when the trial was nearing its conclusion, Wilders's attorney Moszkowicz asked for the judges to be substituted because of a perceived bias against his client. Moszkowicz had unsuccessfully asked for substitution before. The second request was made because Tom Schalken, one of the judges in the court of appeal case that ordered the prosecution of Wilders on 21 January 2009 had allegedly tried to convince a witness in the main trial, Hans Jansen, that the trial was justified. Moszkowicz wanted to hear this witness immediately regarding the alleged conflict of interest, but the court decided it would not hear the witness. The substitution chamber decided that this decision had an appearance of bias and awarded the substitution, thereby ordering a retrial.

In the meantime, the alleged victims argued to the court of appeal that the prosecutors, by arguing for acquittal, had not fulfilled the court's order that Wilders had to be prosecuted, and that they should be replaced in the retrial. On 4 February 2011, the court of appeal decided against this complaint.

=== Retrial ===
On 7 February 2011, the retrial started. In the period between the trials, police investigated the claims that appellate judge Tom Schalken had tried to influence witness Hans Jansen. The new trial began with hearing the witnesses Schalken, Jansen, and Bertus Hendriks; the latter had hosted the dinner party at which Schalken spoke to Jansen. Moszkowicz argued that the trial against Geert Wilders could not continue because the witness had been influenced. During the hearing of Hendriks, Moszkowicz claimed that Hendriks had committed perjury; when the judges did not agree, Moszkowicz tried unsuccessfully to have them substituted as well.

On 23 May 2011, the judges decided that although Schalken should not have talked to Jansen, the witness had not been influenced, and the case could continue. As in the first trial, the public prosecution argued that Wilders should be acquitted on all counts. On 1 June the hearings concluded, with Geert Wilders asking the judges to find him not guilty. On 23 June 2011, Wilders was acquitted by the court of all charges, because his statements were, as presiding judge Marcel van Oosten put it, "acceptable within the context of public debate." Because both the public prosecutor and the defense requested complete acquittal, the verdict will most likely not be appealed, although some thought the plaintiffs might try to take the case before the European Court of Human Rights.

== Reactions ==
Described by Haaretz as "a high-profile affair," the trial attracted international attention. The prosecution was condemned by editorials in The Wall Street Journal, Investor's Business Daily, The Washington Times, The American Spectator, Forbes, The Dallas Morning News, City Journal, Montreal Gazette, The Jerusalem Post, Canada.com, and The Australian. New York City Mayor Michael Bloomberg criticized it in front of the Mayor of Amsterdam and the Dutch Ambassador to the United States. The People's Party for Freedom and Democracy called the case "alarming."

The Dutch center-left Labour party welcomed the court's 2009 decision to prosecute Wilders, as did the Socialist Party. The Muslims and Government Consultative Body said that "We are positive that this will contribute to a more respectful tone to the public debate." Abdelmajid Khairoun, Dutch Muslim Council chairman, expressed support, stating that "Muslim youngsters who make anti-Semitic remarks are prosecuted but Wilders' anti-Islamic remarks go unpunished".

The American Middle East Forum set up a legal defense fund for Wilders.

The Dutch writer and historian Ian Buruma, writing in an op-ed published in the New York Times, argued that "for a man who calls for a ban on the Koran to act as the champion of free speech is a bit rich."

A February 2009 survey by Angus Reid Global Monitor found that Dutch public opinion was deeply split on the prosecution, with 50% supporting Wilders and 43% opposed. However, public support for the Party for Freedom vastly increased since Wilders's legal troubles began, virtually tying with the People's Party for Freedom and Democracy as the third most popular national party. According to Radio Netherlands, "Dutch politicians themselves seem to be keeping quiet on the issue; they are probably worried that media attention will only serve to make the controversial politician more popular."

Robert Spencer, creator of Jihad Watch and author of articles and books relating to Islam and Islamic terrorism, wrote on National Review Online that "The Geert Wilders trial ought to be an international media event; seldom has any court case anywhere had such enormous implications for the future of the free world."

=== Free speech ===
Wilders believed that his freedom of speech and traditional European freedoms were the primary subject of the trial. In February 2010, in an interview with Israel National Radio, Wilders said he was "fighting for one thing: the preservation of our culture, which is based on Christianity, Judaism and humanism – and not on Islam... While Islamization of our society grows, the political elite looks in the other direction and ignores the real problem, namely, the impending loss of our freedom. I am fighting not against Moslems, but against the influx of a totalitarian ideology called Islam." He has cited Gregorius Nekschot, a similar case of Islam related free-speech restrictions, on his website.

After being cleared of all charges, Wilders commented that the victory was not only an acquittal for himself, but a victory for freedom of expression in the Netherlands. Commentators believed that the plaintiffs may attempt to bring their case before the European Court of Human Rights. Gerard Spong, a lawyer instrumental in getting the case heard, expressed his disappointment with the verdict, seeing the judge's ruling based on "public context" as vague. Theo de Roos, professor of law at the Tilburg University, saw the case as a precedent for ethnic incitement in Dutch law, prohibiting only actual threats.

== See also ==
- Criticism of Islam
- Freedom of speech
- Islamophobia
