= Incitement to ethnic or racial hatred =

Criminal offence in several countries

Incitement to ethnic or racial hatred is a crime under the laws of several countries.

== Australia ==
In Australia, the Racial Hatred Act 1995 amends the Racial Discrimination Act 1975, inserting Part IIA – Offensive Behaviour Because of Race, Colour, National or Ethnic Origin. It does not, however, address the issue of incitement to racial hatred. The Australian state of Victoria has addressed the question, however, with its enactment of the Racial and Religious Tolerance Act 2001.

== Finland ==
In Finland, agitation against a population group (Finnish: kiihottaminen kansanryhmää vastaan) is a crime according to the Criminal Code of Finland's (1889/39 and 2011/511) chapter 11, section 10:

Section 10 – Agitation against a population group (511/2011)

"A person who makes available to the public or otherwise spreads among the public or keeps available for the public information, an expression of opinion or another message where a certain group is threatened, defamed or insulted on the basis of its race, skin colour, birth status, national or ethnic origin, religion or belief, sexual orientation or disability or a comparable basis shall be sentenced for agitation against a population group to a fine or to imprisonment for at most two years."

Section 10(a) – Aggravated agitation against a population group (511/2011)

"If agitation against a population group involves exhortation or enticement (1) to genocide or the preparation of genocide, a crime against humanity, an aggravated crime against humanity, a war crime, an aggravated war crime, murder, or manslaughter committed for terrorist intent, or (2) to serious violence other than that referred to in paragraph 1 so that the act clearly endangers public order and safety, and the agitation against a population group is also aggravated when assessed as a whole, the perpetrator shall be sentenced for aggravated agitation against a population group to imprisonment for at least four months and at most four years."

== France ==
Section 24 of the Press Law of 1881 criminalizes incitement to racial discrimination, hatred, or violence on the basis of one's origin or membership in an ethnic, national, racial, or religious group. A criminal code provision deems it an offense to engage in similar conduct via private communication.

In 2002, four Muslim organizations filed a complaint against Michel Houellebecq for stating that Islam was "stupid" and "dangerous" in an interview. The court found that Houellebecq was not immune from the charge on the grounds of literary immunity or freedom of speech but acquitted him on the grounds that he criticized Islam rather than individual Muslims. In 2005, politician Jean Marie Le Pen was convicted of inciting racial hatred for comments made to Le Monde in 2003 about the consequences of Muslim immigration in France. Similar complaints were brought in 2015 after he compared Muslim street prayers to the Nazi occupation of France in 2010, but he was acquitted. In 2008, actress and animal-rights campaigner Brigitte Bardot was convicted on charges of inciting racial hatred for her criticism concerning the ritual slaughter of sheep during the feast of Eid al-Adha in a letter to then-Interior Minister Nicolas Sarkozy. Bardot had been convicted of inciting racial hatred on four other occasions over the previous 11 years for criticizing Muslim immigration.

== Germany ==
Volksverhetzung (German: [ˈfɔlksfɐˌhɛtsʊŋ]), in English "incitement of the masses" (used also in the official English translation of the German Criminal Code), "incitement of popular hatred", "incitement to hatred", or "instigation of the people", is a concept in German criminal law that refers to incitement to hatred against segments of the population and refers to calls for violent or arbitrary measures against them, including assaults against the human dignity of others by insulting, maliciously maligning, or defaming segments of the population.

It is often applied to, though not limited to, trials relating to Holocaust denial in Germany. The criminal code (Strafgesetzbuch) Chapter 7 (Offences against public order), Paragraph 130 (incitement of the masses) of the Federal Republic of Germany defines when a person is guilty of Volksverhetzung.

== Sweden ==
The current Swedish legislation on incitement of hatred against a population group (Swedish: 'hets mot folkgrupp') dates back to 1948 and originally only criminalised incitement to hatred based on 'origin' and religion. The actions of the notorious Swedish anti-Semite Einar Åberg were cited as one of the reasons for the laws' introduction. In 1970 the law was amended to specifically name race and skin colour as well as national and ethnic origin. The law was widened to include hatred based on sexuality in 2002 and gender identity and expression in 2018.

== Norway ==
Under the Norwegian law about hate speech (§ 185), all hatred towards people based on skin colour, nationality or ethnic origin is punishable by fine or up to 3 years' imprisonment. The current law has been in effect since 20 May 2005.

== United Kingdom ==
Under the law of the United Kingdom, "incitement to racial hatred" was established as an offence by the provisions of ss. 17–29 of the Public Order Act 1986, punishable by two years' imprisonment (now seven years). It was first established as a criminal offence in the Race Relations Act 1976.

This offence refers to:

- deliberately provoking hatred of a racial group
- distributing racist material to the public
- making inflammatory public speeches
- creating racist websites on the Internet
- spreading inflammatory rumours about an individual or an ethnic group, for the purpose of spreading racial discontent.

In England and Wales, laws against incitement to hatred against people on religious grounds were later established under the Racial and Religious Hatred Act 2006.

In October 2026, under the UK's legal framework prohibiting incitement to racial hatred, the Metropolitan Police made a series of arrests during Palestinian demonstrations in London. According to police reports, protesters had chanted slogans referencing the Hamas-led attacks of 7 October 2023, calling for an "intifada" and the destruction of Israel. The arrests fell within the UK's legal framework for addressing suspected incitement to racial hatred in the context of political demonstrations.

== See also ==
- Dehumanization
- Genocide prevention
- Hate speech
- Incitement
- Incitement to genocide
- Incitement to terrorism
- International Covenant on Civil and Political Rights, (Article 20, 2)
- International Convention on the Elimination of All Forms of Racial Discrimination (Article 4)
- Psychology of genocide
- Public Order Act 1986
- Crime and Disorder Act 1998
- Religious intolerance
