= Attempt (German penal code) =

An attempt (German: Versuch) according to § 22-24 German Penal Code (StGB) refers to the commission of a crime that the perpetrator began to commit and intended to complete, but that remains incomplete. Attempted serious crimes (those for which the completed crime carries a minimum punishment of more than one year) are by law always punishable; an attempt of a lesser crime is not punishable unless there is a specific provision in the law regarding it. The specific justification for the prohibition of attempts, particularly attempts that pose no danger, is disputed among legal scholars. An attempt is not punished if the perpetrator abandons the attempt.

== History and criminological background ==
=== Criminological background ===
The criminological background for the punishment of attempts is disputed, with a plethora of theories supported by scholarship. The objective theories, which argue that punishment for attempts is based on the danger emanating from unsuccessful attempts, are considered to be inaccurate interpretations of the code, because § 23 III StGB specifically provides for the punishment of failed attempts even when they objectively did not endanger any persons or goods. Subjective theories, which are the type that have usually been applied by courts, instead refer to the perpetrator's decision to act against the legal code as the cause of the punishability; this provides a rationale for punishing failed attempts, but not for the requirements of an act. he majority of scholarship supports mixtures of subjective and objective theories, and refers to acting against the law as punishable because it erodes trust for the legal order; a similar but distinct theory instead focuses specifically on the violation as an expression against the legal order

=== History ===
The current version of the law has been in effect since 1975. It was preceded by § 43 Reichsstrafgesetzbuch, which had replaced § 31 Preußisches Strafgesetzbuch in 1871; that version of the Preußisches Strafgesetzbuch originated in 1851. Historically, the earliest version of this law is derived from Art. 178 of the Constitutio Criminalis Carolina from 1532, which contains what is considered to be one of the earliest significant definitions of what is now considered a punishable attempt.

== Requirements of a punishable attempt ==
As an attempt is by definition not completed, punishing attempted crimes diverges from the general standards of the German penal code, under which a crime has not occurred until the perpetrator's actions have met the full definition of the crime; therefore, the usual Tatbestandsmäßigkeit (which requires completion) is not required. Instead, in addition to the preconditions for a charge of attempt—the prohibition of an attempt and the crime not being completed—it is necessary to show that the perpetrator decided to act, and made a "direct and immediate step towards the realization of the offense." The general standard regarding justification and guilt is applicable. According to § 24 StGB, an attempt is not punishable if the perpetrator voluntarily stops the attempt. The same applies if he makes an earnest effort to prevent its success, if the criminal act would fail without his contribution.

=== Preconditions ===
The primary precondition for a punishable attempt is the existence of a legal prohibition against attempting that crime. For all serious crimes (with a minimum punishment of at least one year), attempts are automatically prohibited. For less serious crimes, a specific clause must clearly disclose that an attempt is punishable. In addition, there is a general requirement that a criminalized attempt is only possible if the original crime was not completed—it is questionable whether this is a special requirement for attempts, or merely a case of the so-called vorgezogene Konkurrenzprüfung, where the attempt would be consumed by the completed crime. . "Completion" of a crime is to be interpreted in the legal and not in the actual sense: for example, in cases of a lack of intent towards a completed crime, or cases of self-defense with the intent to commit an unjustified crime.

=== Subjective component (planning) ===
To constitute criminal attempt, the perpetrator must have intent toward all parts of the crime during the action. Despite some arguments to the contrary, dolus eventualis (knowing of the possibility and consciously accepting it) is sufficient to be convicted of attempt. In such cases, dolus eventualis replaces the requirement that the perpetrator know all the required components of a completed crime. Specifically, the perpetrator must have intent towards the completion of the crime, and not simply desire its failure during the attempt.

=== Objective component (direct and immediate action) ===
To constitute an attempt, the perpetrator must begin the direct and immediate commission of the crime according to their plan, thereby deliberately crossing the boundary between the generally legal acts of preparation and the illegal attempt. There is no general requirement for the perpetrator's plan to be objectively plausible: the evaluation is made according to what the perpetrator believed at the time. There are significant disputes about the practical application of those requirements, with particular disputed areas affecting non-standard cases. In particular, this affects cases where the crime is perpetrated by multiple people or the perpetrator is either incited or aided by another person. There is broad consensus that the law is intended to closely link the commission of the crime with the beginning of the attempt, intentionally excluding from "attempt" such actions as the acquisition of necessary tools and instruments.

=== Unfit attempts ===
Attempts that cannot actually lead to the completion of the crime are classified as unfit. Unfit attempts are punishable; the intent and actions are evaluated according to the subjective perception of the perpetrator. Unfit attempts may include an insufficient object (e.g. attempting to kill a corpse), an insufficient tool (e.g. shooting someone with an unloaded gun), an insufficient modality of the act (e.g. a surprise attack on someone who is already aware of the perpetrator) or an unfit subject (e.g. one who wrongly believes he is acting as a member of a gang that no longer exists or never existed). In cases of attempts that no reasonable person would consider likely to succeed, a lesser or no punishment may be applied. Unfit attempts are distinct from "Wahndelikte", in which a person's actions are legal but he wrongly imagines them to be a crime.

== See also ==
- Inchoate offence
