= Volksverhetzung =

German crime

Volksverhetzung (German: [ˈfɔlksfɐˌhɛtsʊŋ]), in English "incitement of the masses" (used also in the official English translation of the German Criminal Code), "incitement of popular hatred", "incitement to hatred", or "instigation of the people", is a concept in German criminal law that refers to incitement to hatred against segments of the population and refers to calls for violent or arbitrary measures against them, including assaults against the human dignity of others by insulting, maliciously maligning, or defaming segments of the population.

It is often applied to, though not limited to, trials relating to Holocaust denial in Germany. The criminal code (Strafgesetzbuch) Chapter 7 (Offences against public order), Paragraph 130 (incitement of the masses) of the Federal Republic of Germany defines when a person is guilty of Volksverhetzung.

== Constituent elements ==
Incitement of the People (Volksverhetzung) is defined by § 130 (incitement of the masses) Section 1 of the Criminal Code:

=== Section 1 ===
Whoever, in a manner suited to causing a disturbance of the public peace,

1. incites hatred against a national, racial, religious group or a group defined by their ethnic origin, against sections of the population or individuals on account of their belonging to one of the aforementioned groups or sections of the population, or calls for violent or arbitrary measures against them or
2. violates the human dignity of others by insulting, maliciously maligning or defaming one of the aforementioned groups, sections of the population or individuals on account of their belonging to one of the aforementioned groups or sections of the population

incurs a penalty of imprisonment for a term of between three months and five years.

== Substantiation ==
Although freedom of speech is mentioned by Article 5 of the Basic Law (Germany's constitution), said article basically protects any non-outlawed speech. Restrictions exist, e.g. against personal insults, use of symbols of unconstitutional organizations, or Volksverhetzung. For any hate speech to be punishable as Volksverhetzung, the law requires that said speech be "qualified for disturbing public peace" either by inciting "hatred against parts of the populace" or calling for "acts of violence or despotism against them", or by attacking "the human dignity of others by reviling, maliciously making contemptible or slandering parts of the populace". "Germany places strict limits on speech and expression when it comes to right-wing extremism" or anything reminiscent of Nazism. Hate speech on the basis of sexual orientation and gender identity also is banned in Germany.

== Application to offences committed abroad ==
Offences contrary to § 130 of the Criminal Code committed abroad, whether by German nationals or foreigners, can be pursued as a domestic crime when they so act as if they had been committed within the country, affecting the public peace in Germany and violating the human dignity of German citizens. It is sufficient, for example, that criminal content on the Internet, for example in the form of a HTML page, can be accessed from Germany. Hence, for example, the jurisdiction of German courts can be applied for offences of sedition (Volksverhetzungsdelikte) committed abroad. Such an example was the conviction of the Holocaust denier Ernst Zündel by the District Court of Mannheim in February 2007, who was convicted of inciting propaganda he had published from the US and Canada on the Internet.

== Similar laws in other countries ==
Similar laws exist around the world, some examples of which are mentioned below.

- In Austria, Verhetzung is a criminal offense with similar legal elements under section 283 of the Penal Code.
- In the UK, incitement to ethnic or racial hatred is a criminal offense under Sections 17–29 of the Public Order Act 1986.
- In Ireland, the corresponding law is the Prohibition of Incitement to Hatred Act.
- A similar law exists in Sweden as hets mot folkgrupp ("agitation against a population group"), second section 16th chapter 8§ of the criminal code.
- The Criminal Code of Finland, in the sections 3 ("Crime against humanity") and 4 ("Aggravated crime against humanity") of chapter 11 ("War crimes and crimes against humanity"), includes a similar law, which calls the crime kiihottaminen kansanryhmää vastaan in the Finnish version and hets mot folkgrupp in the Swedish version, both meaning "incitement against ethnic groups".
- The Russian Criminal Code, in its 282nd article (titled "Incitement of Hatred or Enmity, as Well as Abasement of Human Dignity"), refers to actions aimed at inciting ethnic or racial hatred. Moreover, §2 of Article 29 of the Russian Constitution disallows and bans "propaganda or agitation" that instigates "hatred and strife" of a "social, racial, national or religious" nature, or promotes the supremacy of a social class, race, nationality, religion, or language variety.
- In Uruguay, the Penal Code, in article 149-BIS (i.e., a complement to article 149, which is on lawbreaking incitement), titled "Incitement to hatred, contempt or violence towards certain persons", condemns incitement or acts of violence and/or contempt against one or more persons on the grounds of race, skin color, religion, national or ethnic origin, sexual orientation or gender identity.
- In the U.S., there is no direct legal equivalent due to the strong protections of free speech under the First Amendment of the U.S. Constitution. However, some U.S. laws address aspects of speech that incite violence or pose a direct threat, including:

- 18 U.S.C. § 2101 (The Federal Riot Act)

This law criminalizes interstate travel or the use of interstate commerce (e.g., mail, telephone, internet) with intent to incite, organize, promote, or encourage a riot.

- 18 U.S.C. § 373 (Solicitation to Commit a Crime of Violence)

This statute makes it illegal to intentionally solicit, command, induce, or otherwise persuade another person to commit a violent federal crime.

- Brandenburg v. Ohio (The Incitement Standard)

The U.S. Supreme Court ruled that speech advocating illegal activity is protected unless it is "directed to inciting or producing imminent lawless action and is likely to incite or produce such action."

- 42 U.S.C. § 1985(3) (Civil Rights Conspiracy)

This law allows individuals to sue for damages if they are targeted by conspiracies to deprive them of equal protection under the law, particularly in cases of racial or ethnic violence.

- 18 U.S.C. § 249 (The Matthew Shepard and James Byrd Jr. Hate Crimes Prevention Act)

While these laws enhance penalties for crimes motivated by bias (e.g., race, religion, sexual orientation), they do not criminalize speech alone unless it is tied to a criminal act.

- 18 U.S.C. § 1038 (False information and hoaxes)

This law makes it a federal crime to knowingly convey false or misleading information about certain serious crimes or attacks, including biological attacks, under circumstances where the information could reasonably be believed.

== See also ==
- Hate speech laws by country
- Incitement to ethnic or racial hatred
- Stochastic terrorism
- Verbotsgesetz 1947
