= League of Koreans in Japan =

1945–1949 group for Zainichi Koreans

- 在日本朝鮮人連盟
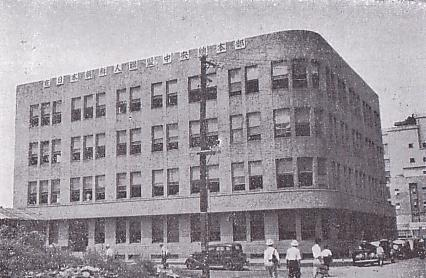
- Chōren headquarters (1946)
- Nickname: Chōren
- Formation: October 15, 1945
- Dissolved: September 8, 1949
- Headquarters: Tokyo, Japan

The League of Koreans in Japan (Japanese: 在日本朝鮮人連盟; Korean: 재일조선인련맹/재일조선인연맹), abbreviated as Chōren (朝連), was an organization for Zainichi Koreans that operated between October 1945 and 1949.

Before Chōren, there had been no legal Korean-run organizations for residents since the 1920s.

== Background ==
From 1910 to 1945, Korea was a colony of the Empire of Japan. During this time, Japan placed Korea into a process of assimilation into Japanese culture. It banned aspects of traditional Korean culture, mandated education be in Japanese only, and encouraged Koreans to adopt Japanese names. Prior to World War II, immigration from Korea to Japan was largely voluntary. However, when wartime labor shortages began, Japan began forcefully mobillizing Koreans to support their war effort. Between 1939 and 1945, around 700,000–800,000 Koreans were moved to Japan. By 1945, the number of Koreans in Japan peaked at around two million. Around 30,000 ethnic Koreans even died in the atomic bombing of Hiroshima.

Following the surrender of Japan in 1945, the U.S. placed Japan under occupation and began disassembling its colonial empire. The majority (1 to 1.2 million) of Koreans began to prepare to move back to the peninsula. The remaining Koreans decided to stay for a variety of reasons. Some could not afford the trip back to the peninsula, some feared the instability and poverty in the peninsula, which had just been divided, and some had made their lives in the peninsula and had Japanese-speaking families.

Within days of Japan's surrender, Koreans in Japan became the target of vented frustrations. A police report from Yamaguchi Prefecture recorded statements such as "Japan lost the war because of you Koreans; [now] go back to Korea immediately" and "all Koreans must be killed". Two days after the war ended, Japanese policemen shot to death three Koreans who went to welcome the arrival of U.S. military forces in Chōshi. These incidents frightened Koreans, and caused them to form support organizations and self-segregate for their own protection.

Although Koreans in Japan had experienced discrimination prior to World War II, they had still been Japanese citizens. However, after the war, the Japanese government gradually stripped them of significant rights and benefits. In December 1945, they lost their right to vote. In 1947, the Alien Registration Ordinance formally stripped them of their citizenship, rendering them stateless. What's more, employment policies were put in place that excluded Koreans from "Japanese jobs". This drove many Koreans to pursue jobs in informal, marginalized, or illegal sectors.

The Americans were surprised by the miserable conditions that Koreans had been held in, as well as the retaliation that was being directed towards them. They determined that Koreans "may be in urgent need of liberation, protection, or segregation from the Japanese". For example, on October 10, the 5th Marine Division's 28th Marine Regiment observed that Koreans waiting to return home in Hakata-ku, Fukuoka were being housed in horse stables, despite the fact that more comfortable warehouses were nearby. When the Americans suggested to the Fukuoka Prefecture's Social Welfare Department that the Koreans be put there instead, the chief of the department, Shiroto Teizō, strongly disagreed. According to historian Matthew R. Augustine, "Shiroto argued, ironically, that the warehouses were not designed to house people". The U.S. pushed back and ordered Shiroto to prepare the warehouses for use within two days.

== History ==
=== Foundation ===
On September 10, 1945, a meeting between representatives from various Korean residents associations throughout the country was held in Tokyo. The result of this meeting was the formation of a preparatory committee for establishing the League of Koreans. By design, the committee had both left- and right-leaning members. Part of their declaration read:

In close consultation with the appropriate authorities, we will maintain our friendship with the Japanese and provide stability for our fellow Korean residents, while also facilitating [safe passage for] fellow countrymen returning to Korea.

The committee chose as their chairman Cho Duseong, a Korean Christian minister born in the United States and a fluent speaker of English, in order to appeal to the U.S. They began organizing regional offices throughout the country. On September 15, the committee established its central headquarters in Tokyo, and made nine regional headquarters in prefectures with significant Korean populations. On October 2, three representatives from the preparatory committee met with Prime Minister Higashikuni to request government assistance for Koreans remaining in Japan. Several days later, they had a meeting with U.S. occupation authorities of the Supreme Commander for the Allied Powers (SCAP). They requested the right to possess and operate their own ships to coordinate return trips to the peninsula.

=== Foundation ===
From October 15 to October 16, 1945, the inauguration ceremony for Chōren was held in Tokyo. Around 5,000 representatives from around the country attended. On October 17, they selected Yun Geun, head of the Korean YMCA in Tokyo, as their chairman. By the end of the year, they had 35 prefectural headquarters and 223 branch offices. The organization rapidly gained the broad support of the Korean community in Japan.

However, the organization quickly moved towards the political left. It expelled "pro-Japanese" conservatives. These people formed two organizations, one in November 1945 and another in January 1946. Both organizations played only a minor role in the Korean community, but openly feuded with Chōren. The Americans also released Korean communists who had been imprisoned at Fuchū Prison. One of these communists, Kim Duyong, became an influential communist voice in the organization, and managed the publication of an increasingly left-leaning newspaper: The People's Newspaper (민중신문; Minjung sinmun). These communists were also affiliated with the Japanese Communist Party (JCP), which Chōren became increasingly aligned with.

Chōren also advocated for Korean workers still in Japan. When 3,500 to 4,000 Korean conscripted laborers began rioting at the Jōban coal mines, the company asked Chōren for advice on how to proceed. On October 19, Kim Duyong and a member of the JCP journeyed to the mines and participated in negotiations. However, negotiations fell through, and unrest led to American intervention and the repatriation of Korean workers without compensation. Chōren also confronted companies that had treated their Korean workers poorly. These represented the earliest attempts to seek compensation for forced labor in postwar Japan. Such attempts have continued into the twenty-first century.

SCAP, which had taken note of the communist presence in the organization, saw these aggressive negotiations as communist activism. They also disliked the impact that the conflict had on the crucial coal supply. This caused SCAP to side with the coal companies against Chōren. However, SCAP did encourage repatriation efforts, although the Japanese government handled most of the logistics for them. Beginning around mid-November, Chōren began directly negotiating with the Japanese Transportation and Welfare Ministries to coordinate the return of Koreans. The Japanese government readily cooperated, as it found Chōren's extensive network useful.

Beginning in 1946, they made one of their top priorities the creation of ethnic Korean schools. Koreans had been eager to recover their cultural heritage, and saw language education as key to doing so. These efforts resulted in schools even in remote parts of Japan. By October 1946, they had 525 elementary schools, 4 middle schools, over 1,000 teachers, and more than 43,000 students. By April 1948, they managed to establish 566 primary schools with 48,930 students, as well as seven secondary schools with 2,416 students.

The quick successes of Chōren inspired the formation of similar groups for other ethnic minorities in Japan, including the Taiwanese, Chinese, and Okinawans. The League of Okinawans also became associated with the JCP, and through the JCP, Chōren.

=== Hanshin Education Incident ===
The organization's left-leaning tendencies and alignment with the Japanese Communist Party and North Korea drew the ire of both the U.S. and Japan, which began moving to shut down most Korean schools in the country. This led to significant protests in a number of cities by Koreans. The protests were violently suppressed, which resulted in hundreds of casualties and thousands of arrests.
