= Hate Speech Act of 2016 (Japan) =

Controversial law

Hate Speech Elimination Act
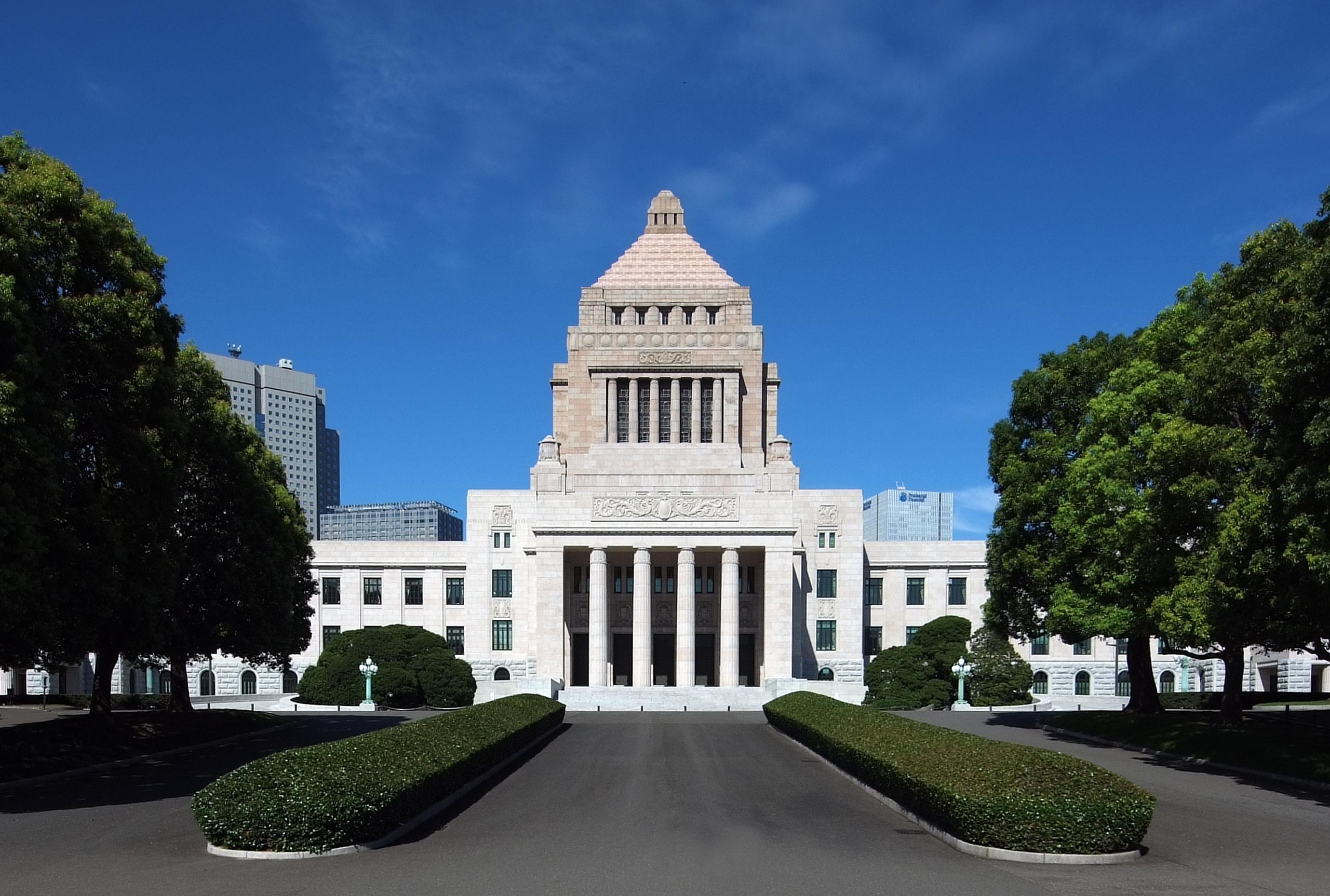

National Diet
- Long title: Act on the Promotion of Efforts to Eliminate Unfair Discriminatory Speech and Behavior against Persons Originating from Outside Japan (本邦外出身者に対する不当な差別的言動の解消に向けた取組の推進に関する法律)
- Administered by: Ministry of Justice
- Status: In force

The Hate Speech Act of 2016 is a Japanese law that regulates hate speech. It was enacted on 25 May 2016 by the National Diet. However, it does not ban hate speech and sets no penalty for committing it.

The act was passed in order to comply with United Nations' International Convention on the Elimination of All Forms of Racial Discrimination, which stands for eliminating hate speech from the world. Japan Innovation Party argues that the bill should expand to include insults. The Liberal Democratic Party, on the other hand, argues that criminalizing hate speech would lead to loss of freedom. Members of the Constitutional Democratic Party of Japan and the Japanese Communist Party have called for the enactment of new legislation in order to further advance the cause. Moving forward, it is unclear whether or not Japan will more strictly enforce the Hate Speech Act of 2016.
