= Strafgesetzbuch =

German penal code

Strafgesetzbuch (German pronunciation: [ˈʃtʁaːfɡəˌzɛtsbuːx], lit. 'penal law book'), abbreviated to StGB, is the German penal code.

== History ==
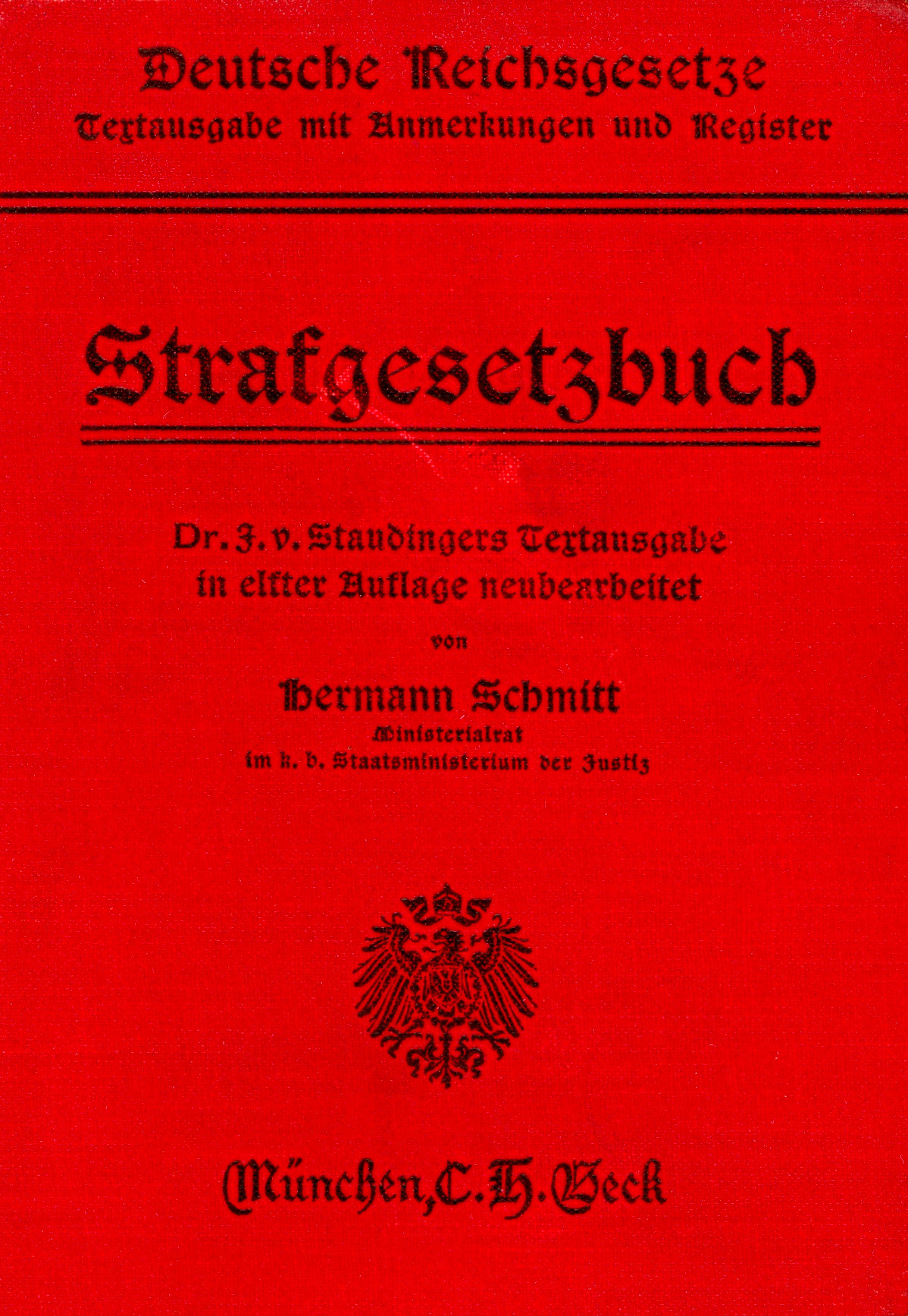
Strafgesetzbuch (1914)

In Germany the Strafgesetzbuch goes back to the Penal Code of the German Empire passed in the year 1871 on May 15 in Reichstag which was largely identical to the Penal Code of the North German Confederation from 1870. It came into effect on January 1, 1872.

This Reichsstrafgesetzbuch (Imperial Penal Code) was changed many times in the following decades in response not only to changing moral concepts and constitutional provision granted by the Grundgesetz, but also to scientific and technical reforms. Examples of such new crimes are money laundering or computer sabotage.

The Penal Code is a codification of criminal law and the pivotal legal text, while supplementary laws contain provisions affecting criminal law, such as definitions of new types of crime and law enforcement action. The StGB constitutes the legal basis of criminal law in Germany.

After the defeat of Nazi Germany, a number of prohibiting provisions were included in the Strafgesetzbuch:

- Friedensverrat ("treason to peace"): preparation of a war of aggression (§ 80; since 2017 § 13 Völkerstrafgesetzbuch) and incitement to a war of aggression (§ 80a)
- dissemination of means of propaganda of unconstitutional organizations (§ 86)
- use of symbols of unconstitutional organizations (§ 86a)
- incitement to hatred against segments of the population (Volksverhetzung) (§ 130)

In 2002 German public prosecutors were empowered to prosecute crimes against humanity, war crimes and genocide internationally under the Völkerstrafgesetzbuch ("Code of Crimes against international Law"). Another special penal code is the Wehrstrafgesetz to prosecute special crimes within military service such as insubordination (§20 WStG) and desertion (§16 WStG).

== Structure ==
The German Penal Code is divided into two main parts:

General Part (Allgemeiner Teil): in which general issues are arranged, for example:

- Area of the law's validity
- Law-related definitions
- Capacity to be adjudged guilty
- Perpetration and incitement or accessoryship
- Necessary defence
- General provisions for punishments (fines and imprisonment)
- Statutes of limitations
- Attempts
- Competition

Special Part (Besonderer Teil): in which the different criminal offences and their definitions and punishments are listed, for example:

- Crimes against the democratic rule of law
- Crimes against public order
- Crimes against the person of a sexual nature
- Crimes against life
- Crimes against another person's wealth (for example robbery and theft)

== Notable sections ==
These sections differ significantly from the criminal codes in other countries, and/or are relevant for topics discussed in other articles.

=== § 86a: Use of symbols of unconstitutional organisations ===
Outlaws the distribution or public use of symbols of unconstitutional groups, in particular, flags, insignia, uniforms, slogans and forms of greeting. The laws ban most Nazi insignia from any usage for propagating the ideology outside artistic, scientific, research, or opposition uses (swastikas, SS sig runes, Totenkopf, Odal SS-rune, the neo-Nazi version of the Celtic Cross, the swastikas versions of the Iron Cross and Reichsadler, Wolfsangel, the party and Reichkriegsflagge Nazi flags, the Sturmabteilung emblem, the Nazi salute and the greetings "Heil Hitler" or "Sieg Heil", are outlawed under the law) it also extends to bans on symbols of the Communist Party of Germany (Hammer and sickle, red star and red flag are under it), ISIS Black Standard, and Kurdish People's Protection Units (YPG) pennant.

This section has been the basis for the confiscation of video games like Wolfenstein 3D or Mortyr and the censorship of Nazi symbolism in World War II-related media until August 2018.

=== § 103: Insulting of organs and representatives of foreign states (repealed) ===
Turkish president Recep Tayyip Erdoğan himself made a complaint in 2016 against German satirist Jan Böhmermann as a private person because of an alleged insult. The Deputy Prime Minister of Turkey, Numan Kurtulmuş, called the poem a "serious crime against humanity".

On 1 June 2017 the German Bundestag decided by a unanimous vote to repeal this section. This decision went into effect on 1 January 2018.

=== § 130: Incitement to hatred (Volksverhetzung) ===
Section 130 makes it a crime to:

- incite hatred against segments of the population or call for violent or arbitrary measures against them in a manner capable of disturbing the peace
- to insult, maliciously malign, or defame segments of the population in a manner capable of disturbing the peace
- disseminate, publicly make accessible, produce, obtain, supply, stock, offer, announce, commend, undertake to import or export, or facilitate such use by another of written materials that assaults the human dignity of others by insulting, maliciously maligning or defaming segments of the population or a previously indicated group
- approve of, deny or downplay an act committed under the rule of National Socialism in a manner capable of disturbing the peace

This section is often applied to trials related to Holocaust denial.

=== § 131: Representation of violence (Gewaltdarstellung) ===
Outlaws the dissemination or public display of media "which describe cruel or otherwise inhuman acts of violence against human or humanoid beings in a manner which expresses a glorification or rendering harmless of such acts of violence or which represents the cruel or inhuman aspects of the event in a manner which injures human dignity".

This section was used as the legal basis for confiscating some horror movies and a few video games such as Mortal Kombat, Manhunt, and Condemned.

=== § 140: Rewarding and approving crimes ===
Outlaws rewarding or approving of crimes "publicly, in a meeting or through dissemination of writings […], and in a manner that is capable of disturbing the public peace". This only applies to crimes where failure to report is an offense (§ 138), among them preparation of a war of aggression (§ 80), murder, robbery, treason, and counterfeiting money.

This section formed the grounds for the lawsuit against Holger Voss.

=== § 175: Homosexual acts between men (repealed) ===
In 1871, the German Empire made homosexual acts between men illegal as "unnatural fornication" (widernatürliche Unzucht), with a sentence of imprisonment for six months if convicted. In Nazi Germany the law was severely escalated: the sentence was increased to 10 years and one could be convicted upon mere suspicion by the authorities.

After World War 2 and the partition of Germany, the law was diluted over time. In West Germany homosexual acts between men above the age of 21 were decriminalized; in the German Democratic Republic (East Germany) the ban was deleted in 1968. After reunification, the ban was fully repealed in 1994.

=== § 202c: Preparation of data espionage or data interception ===
Highly controversial, it outlaws the preparation of an act of data espionage (§ 202a) or data interception (§ 202b) by making, obtaining, selling, distributing (or otherwise committing or making accessible to others).

1. passwords or security codes to access data, or
2. computer programs whose purpose is to commit such an act.

In 2007 Cornelia Winter gave criticism to this regulation. She wrote a press with title "Draft version of Section 202c of the German Criminal Code threatens to criminalize computer scientists." (Entwurfsfassung des § 202c StGB droht Informatiker/innen zu krimina~~i~~lisieren) which stated that "However, a distinction between applications used for committing crimes and those produced exclusively for legal purposes is not possible."

=== § 211: Murder (under aggravating circumstances) ===
The intentional, successful killing of another person, with at least one of the aggravating circumstances mentioned in § 211 sec.2 fulfilled. Those circumstances concern base motives, criminal aims or cruel ways of committing the crime. An intentional killing that does not qualify for Mord is called Totschlag (§ 212). § 211 is the only crime within the Strafgesetzbuch that carries a mandatory sentence of life imprisonment (a sentence of life without parole is not expressly provided for in German law, but it is possible certain convicts of murder can spend the rest of their lives in prison).

=== § 218: Abortion ===
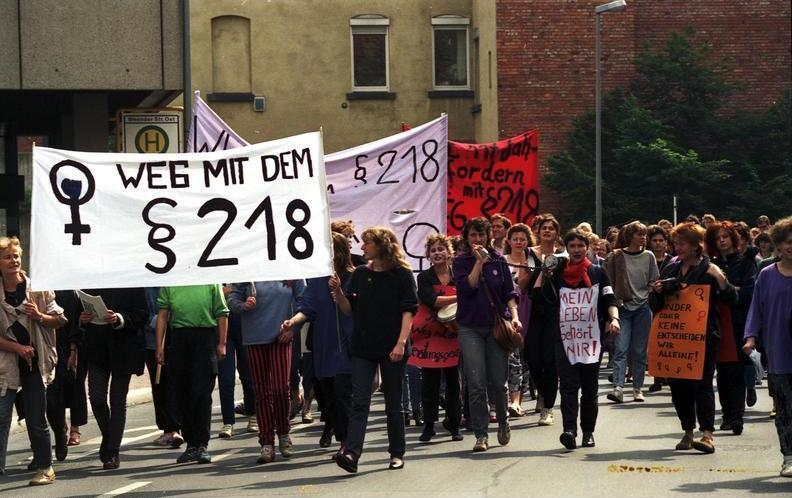
Demonstration against an earlier version of § 218 in Göttingen, 1988

Abortion (Schwangerschaftsabbruch) is illegal in Germany. It will cause 3 years of imprisonment in (1). In (2) if a person causes a pregnant woman to let it be in danger of death or hardly harmed; violating the will of the woman can be sentenced for 5 years.

Nevertheless, in 218b, abortion can be not punishable in some conditions, e.g. the operation is held by a doctor; the pregnancy is not over 12 weeks.

=== § 219a: Ban on advertising for abortions (repealed) ===
Paragraph 219a forbade medical professionals from providing information about any abortion services they offered. The law was enacted in 1933, months after the Nazi party had come to power. It was repealed in 2022.

=== § 323c: Duty to Rescue ===
This is a Good Samaritan law. Chiefly, if a person is in an accident or any kind of danger, people nearby are obligated to help in whatever way they reasonably can.

In July 2015, a driver accidentally drove a car into a coffee shop resulting in 2 deaths and 9 injuries. After emergency services arrived, a firefighter forbade a bystander from taking photographs while the police were recovering bodies. The bystander then insulted the firefighter, refused to comply and yelled "come here, everyone!". A scuffle then ensued involving his two brothers, during which two police officers sustained minor injuries. Thereafter, the bystander was charged with assault and resisting arrest; his two brothers were also charged as co-defendants. The bystander was eventually convicted by the district court in Stade and sentenced to 4 months in prison. This "gawking incident" is one of the backgrounds for § 323c being enacted.
