= Sværtegade 1 =

Building in Copenhagen, Denmark

Sværtegade 1 /Pilestræde 40
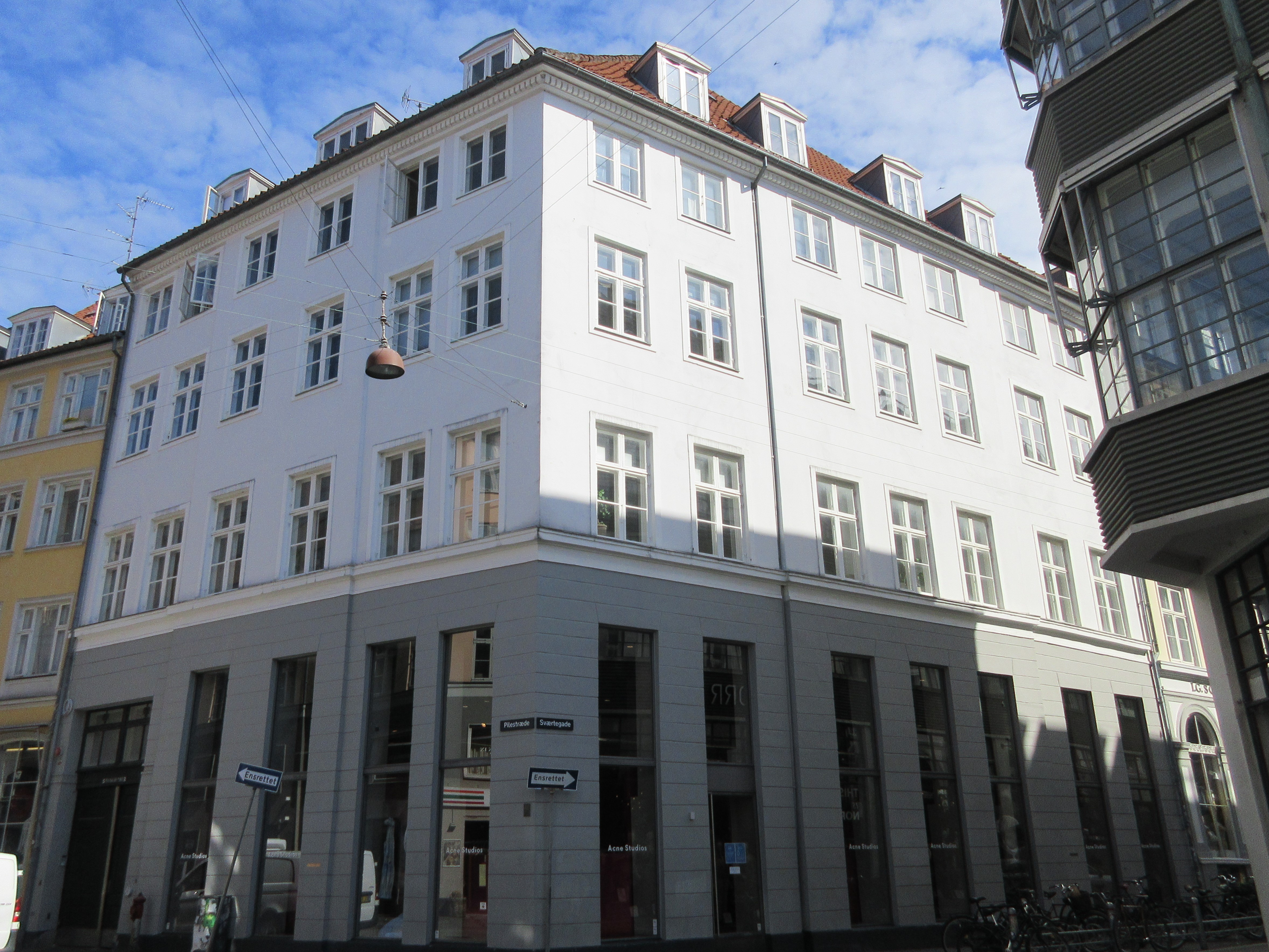
- Interactive map of the Sværtegade 1 /Pilestræde 40 area

General information
- Location: Copenhagen, Denmark
- Coordinates: 55°40′51.6″N 12°34′48.72″E
- Completed: 1739s
- Renovated: 1812, 1850

Sværtegade 1 / Pilestræde 40 is a heritage listed building situated at the corner of Pilestræde and Sværtegade in the Old Town of Copenhagen, Denmark. Originally a two-storey building from the 1730s, constructed on the foundations of Christian IV's Canon Foundry, it was later heightened twice, first with one storey in 1812 and then with another one in 1850. Christian Steen opened a bookshop in the building in the 1810s. Other notable former residents include the architect Wilhelm Klein. In the middle of the 20th century, Pilestræde 40 became known as Glargården (Old Danish: The Glass House) after having been acquired by Copenhagen's Glaziers Guild. The building was listed in the Danish registry of protected buildings and places in 1986. It is now owned by Odense-based Barfoed Group.

== History ==
=== Site history, 1510–1728 ===
Christian IV constructed a canon foundry on the site in 1610. It was later moved to a new building on Kongens Nytorv. On 31 May 1671, the property in Pilestræde was sold to stamped paper-manager Albert Heintz for 2,000 rigsdaler. His widow Magdalene Klingenberg kept the property after his death. Her property was listed in Copenhagen's first cadastre of 1689 as No. 95 in Købmager Quarter. The next owner was wine merchant Henrik Würner. In 1691, he sold the property to wine merchant Jochum Würger. After the death of his widow, the large property was divided into four properties: A large corner property (now Pilestræde 40/Sværtegade 1 and Sværtegade 3) and three smaller properties in Pilestræde (now Pilestræde 42, Pilestræde 44 and Pilestræde 46). The buildings on the site were all destroyed in the Copenhagen Fire of 1728.

=== 18th century ===
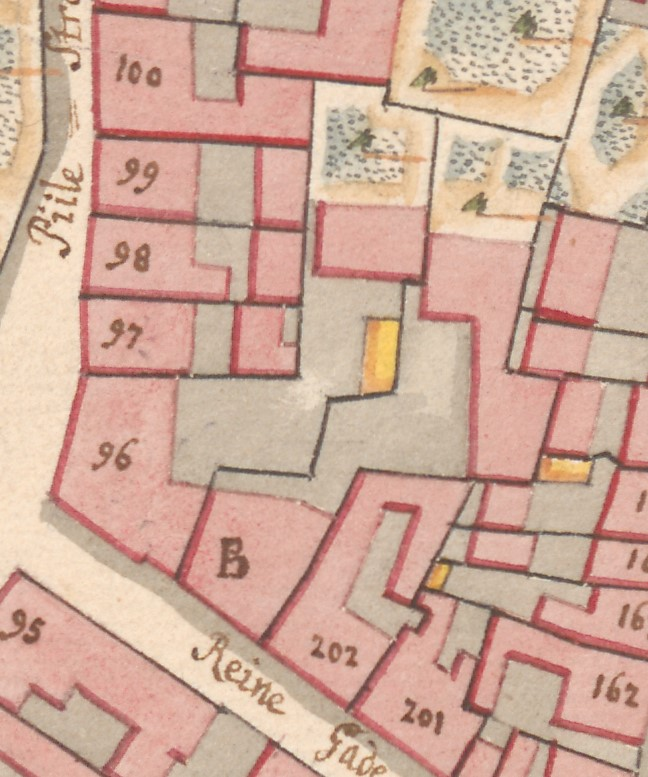
No. 96 seen on a detail from Christian Gedde's map of Jøbmager Quarter, 1757.

The present building on the site was constructed with two storeys in 1734-37 by master mason Gotfrid Schuster. The property was listed in the new cadastre of 1756 as No. 96 in Købmager Quarter. The property was shortly thereafter divided into two separate properties, referred to as No. 96A (Pilestræde 40/Sværtegade 1) and No. 96 B (Sværtegade 3). On Christian Gedde's map of Klædebo Quarter from 1868, No. 96A was simply marked as No. 96 while No. 96B was marked with a large B. No. 06 A belonged to post manager Jens Lange.

No. 96 was home to five households at the 1787 census. Corfitz Fisker, a post inspector with title of justitsråd, resided in the building with his wife Catharine Erikstine Sønderborg, his sister-in-law Catharina Sønderborg, a junior clerk (skriverdreng) and two maids. Johan Friederich Alexander Shifman, a lagationsråd, resided in the building with his wife Charlotte Amalie Zeligem their seven-year-old dayugther, one male servant and two maids. Marie Lykke Holbech. a widow, resided in the building with her four children (aged six to 10). Claus Poulsen, a teacher of navigation, resided in the building with his wife Karen Marie. Jens Rasmussen Bay, a junk dealer, resided in the buildings withhis wife Inger Marie NN, their two sons (aged two and three) and one maid. Johan Kølpel, a school teacher, resided in the building with his wife Dorthea Rantrum, two of their children /aged 23 and 27) and one maid.

=== 18th century ===
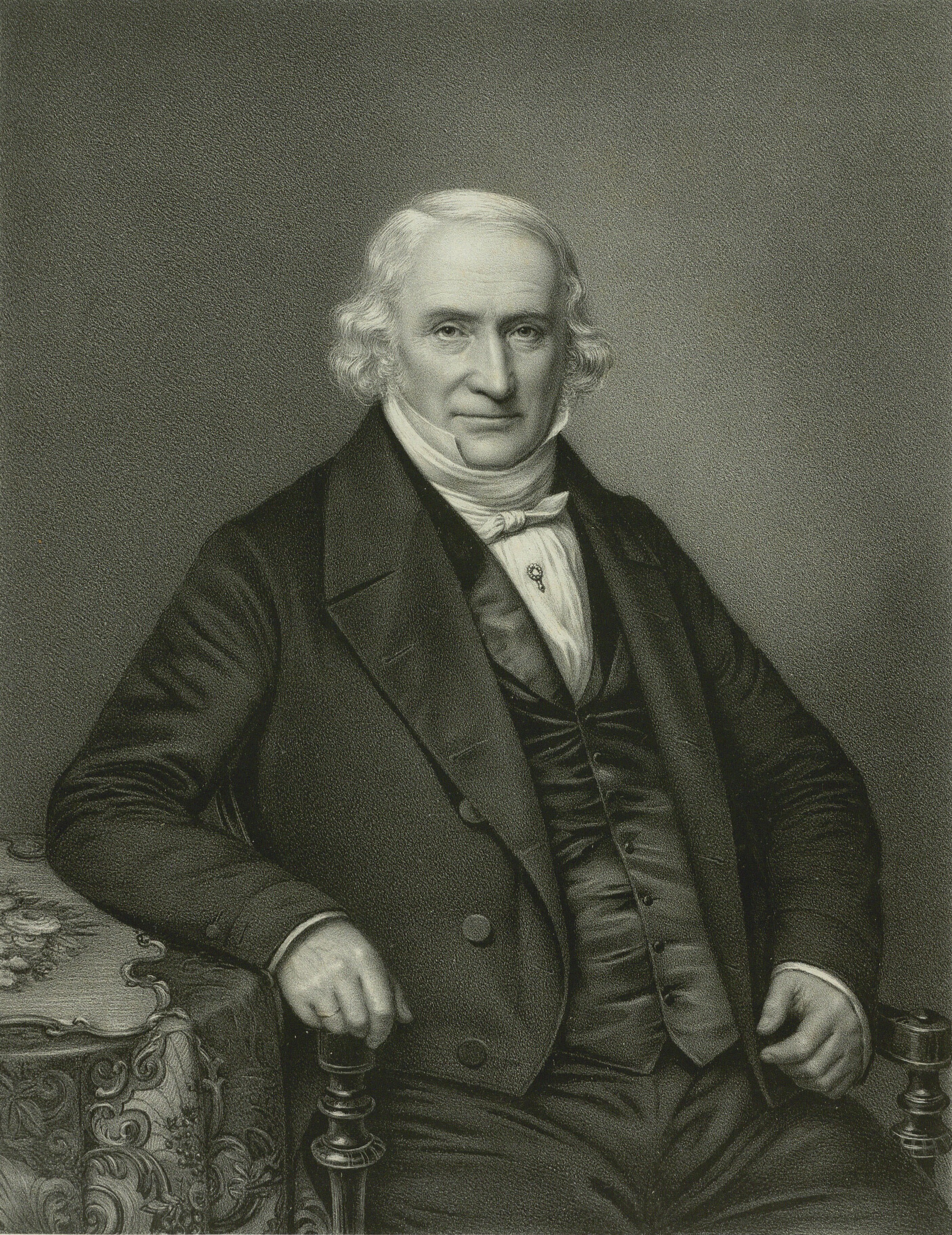
Christian Steen.

Christian Buck, a billiard holder, resided in the building at the 1801 census. He lived there with his wife Carl August Buck, their three children (aged bibe to 12(, two maids and three lodgers.

The property was listed in the new cadastre of 1806 as No. 121 in Kæbmager Quarter. It belonged to one J. C. Boch at that time. Scguster's two-storey building was heightened with one storey in 1812.

In the 1810s, Christian Steen moved his bookshop to the ground floor of the building. Ot had until then been located in Helliggejststræde. In 1820, he moved it to his new building at Kronprinsensgade 39.

Christian Steen kept the shop at the corner of Pilestræde and Sværtegade until at least 1845 The property was home to 24 residents at the 1845 census. Steen's son Frederiks, who would later become a partner in the company, resided on the ground floor with another bookseller and an apprentice. Marie Elisabeth Bay, Rebecca Sophie Ir. Bay and Louise Caroline Bay—three women tailors /sisters)—resided on the first floor with two other women (named Müller), one maid and one lodger (lieutenant). Ditlev Vilhelm Klein (1793-1868), a master mason, resided on the second floor with his wife Marie Kirstine (née Skousboe, 1806–1891), their four children (aged one to nine), three maids and the clerk Carl Lauritz Bruun. Their eldest son was the later architect Vilhelm Klein. Søren Sørensen and Marinius Norlander—two employees in a wine shop—resided in the basement with one male servant.

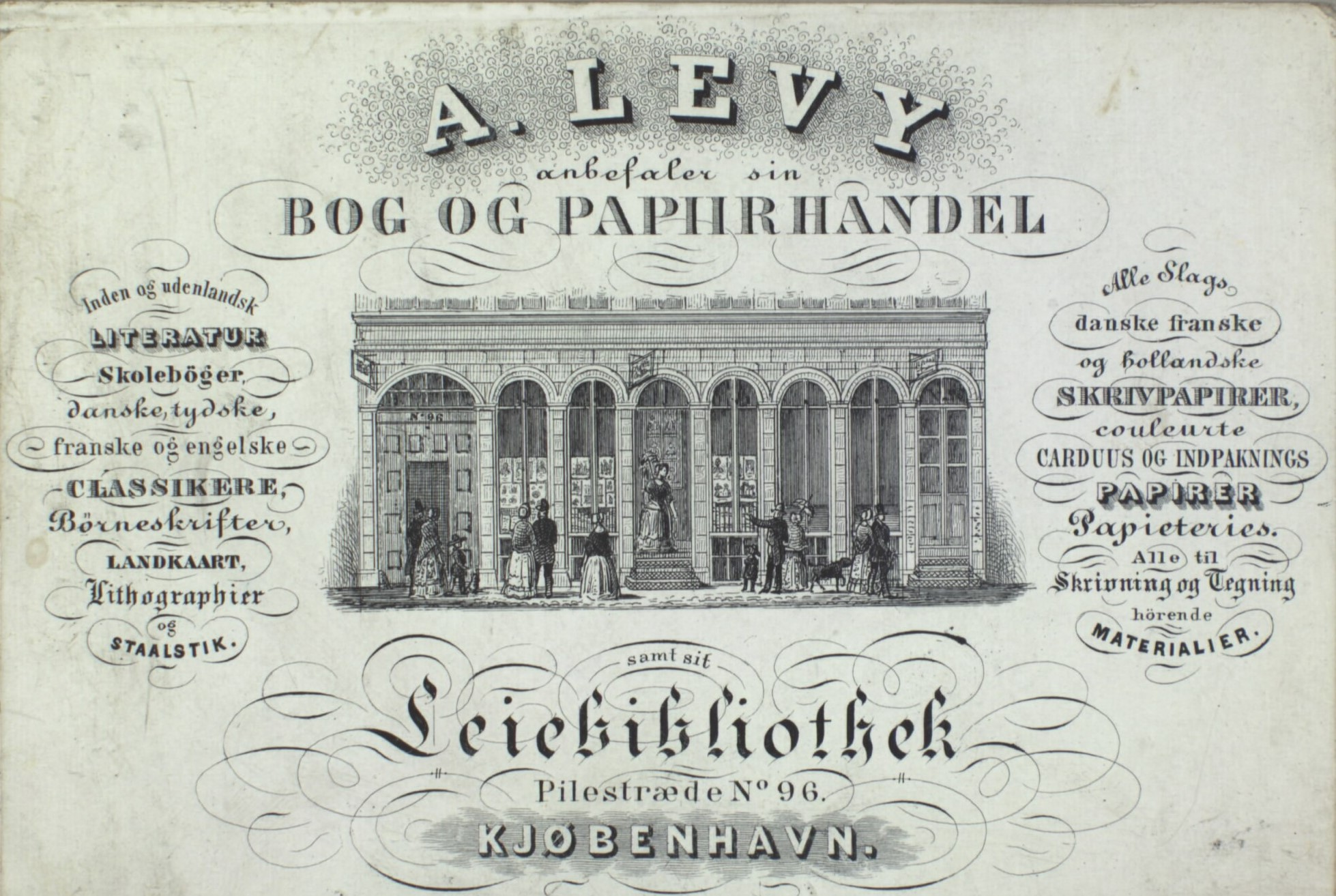
Advert for A. Leby's bookshop.

The property was again heightened with one storey in 1840. The property was listed as Pilestræde 40/Sværtegade 1 when house numbering by street was introduced as a supplement to the old cadastral numbers by quarter in 1859.

On 30 December 1852, Adolf Levy (1823-1873) opened a bookshop in the building. His shop sold both new and used books as well as paper and a selection of gift items. He also published some of Dumas' writings in his father-in-law Edvard Meyer's translations. In 1866–68, he published the newspaper General-Program". At some point after 197+, Leby moved his business to Pilestræde 15. Levy died on 23 January 1873. His widow Frederikke Levy (1834-) continued the firm.It closed in around 1886.

=== 2+th century ===
Valdemar Jørgensen's perfumery was located on the ground floor of the building in the 1810s. The affiliated soap company Bruun & Andresen was also based in the building.

A banana shop occupied the ground floor of the building in 1923.

Glarmestrenes Glasforsikring A/S, a glass insurance company, was based in the building in 1950. The firm was founded om 6. October 1885 by glaziers in Copenhagen with glazier M. S. Jørgensen (1834-1901) as chairman. Chr. Andersen (1880-) was CEO of the company in 1950. The building was given the name Glargården (!The Glass House") after it was acquired by the Flaziers Guild. The first part of the name Glar- is an old Danish word for glass (glas in modern Danish) which has survived in the word flarmester (Dabusg fir glazier). The suffic gård(en) means building(house.

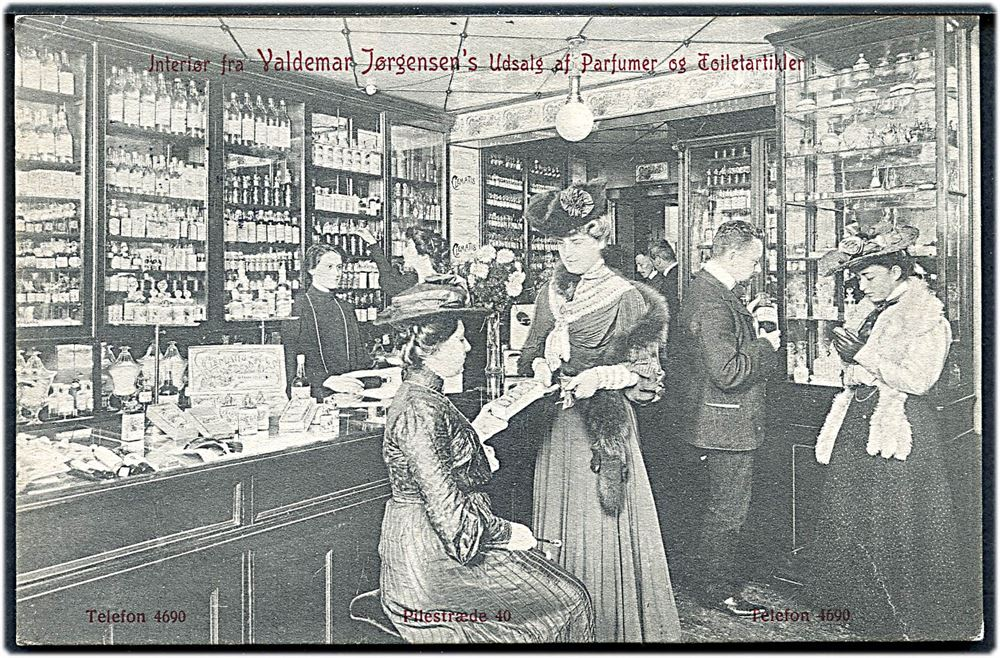
Valdemar Jørgensen's perfumerie

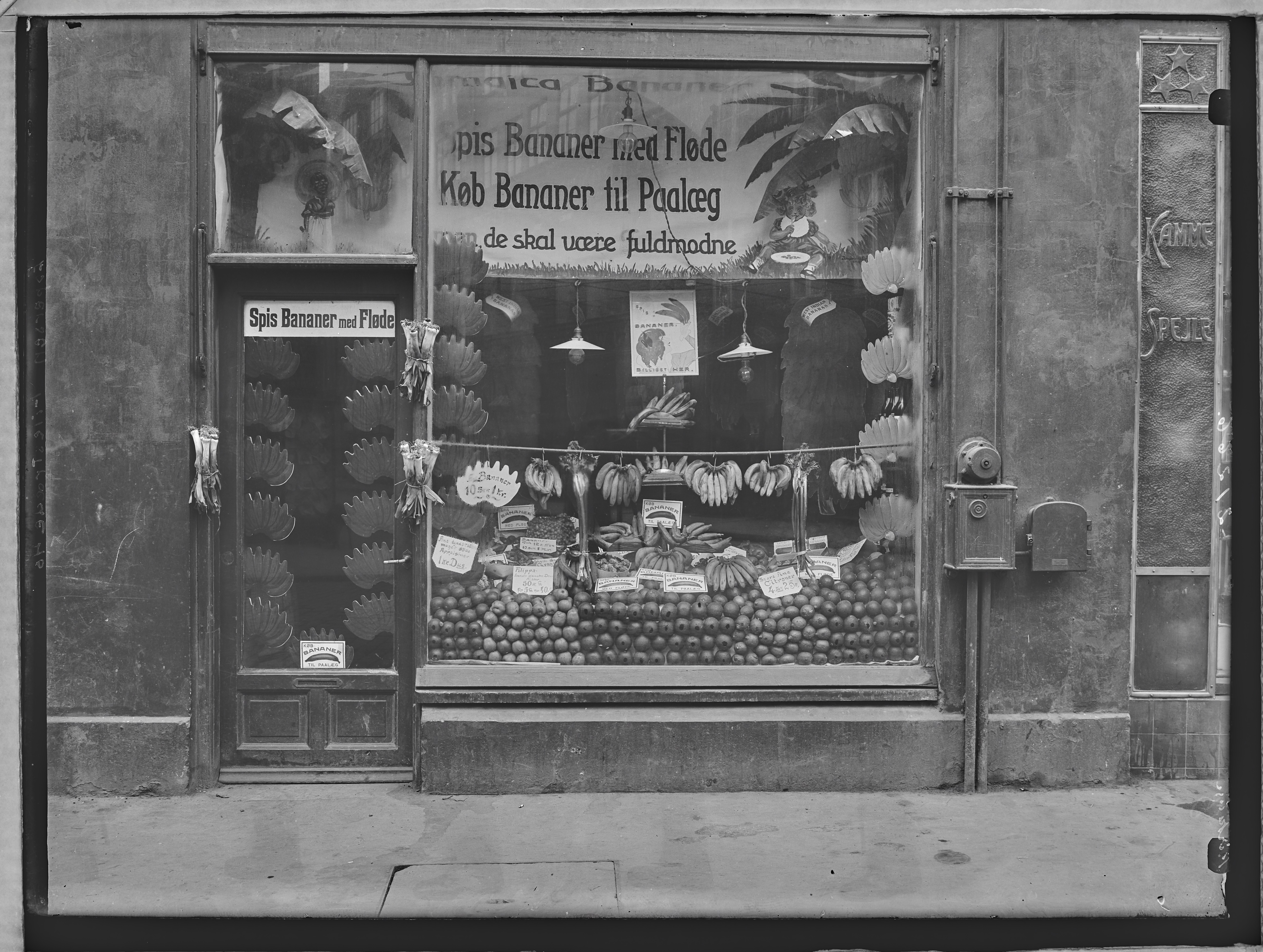
Banana shop at Pilestræde 40, 1923.

== Architecture ==
Sværtegade 1/Pilestræde 40 is a four-storey corner building with a seven-bay-long facade towards Sværtegade and a six-bay-long facade towards Pilestræde. Schuster's two-storey building from the 1730s incorporated elements from Christian IV's canon foundry. The building featured a three-bay gabled wall dormer towards Sværtegade and a two-bay gabled wall dormer towards Pilestræde. This building was heightened with one storey in 1812 and another storey in 1850. The three central bays towards Sværtegade and the two central bays towards Pilestræde form slightly projecting median risalits. The ground floor of the plastered facade is finished with shadow joints and painted in a dark-grey colour above a low black-painted plinth. A gate in Pilestræde affords access to a large central courtyard shared with Sværtegade 3 and Pilestræde 4246. Access to the principal staircase of the building is via a door in the gateway. The pitched roof is clad in red tiles. It features four dormer windows towards Sværtegade and another three towards Pilestræde.

== Today ==
As of 2008, Pilestræde 40&Sværtegade 1 belonged to C.W. Obel Ejendomme A/S in 2008. ==Today== Sværtegade 3 and the adjacent building at No. 1 were both acquired by Odense-based Barfoed Group in 2010.
