= Sværtegade 3 =

Property in Copenhagen, Denmark

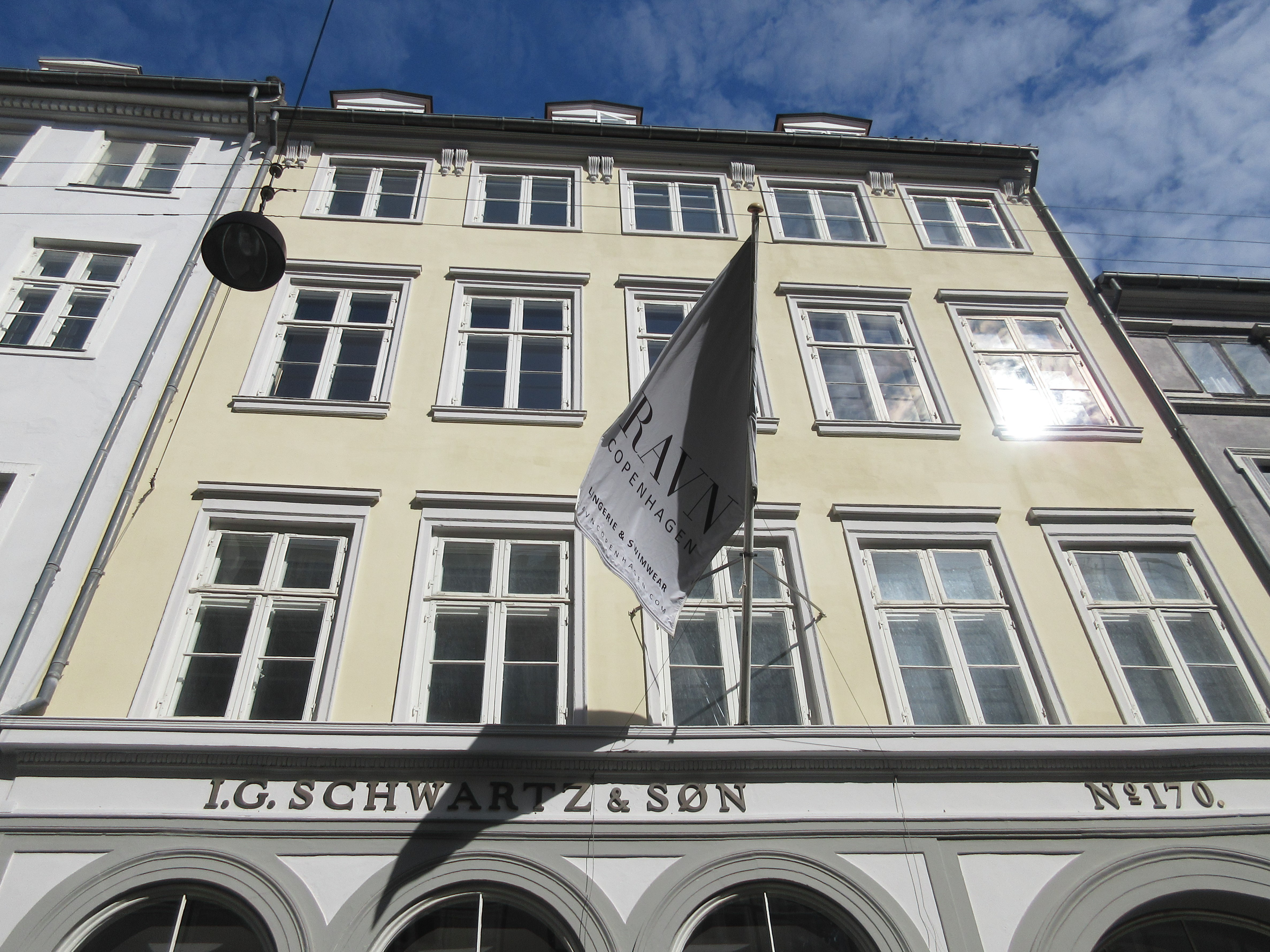
- Interactive map of the Sværtegade 3 area

General information
- Location: Copenhagen, Denmark
- Coordinates: 55°40′51.85″N 12°34′49.51″E
- Completed: 1791 (No. 3)
- Renovated: 1847
- Client: Hinrich Ladiges

Sværtegade 3 is a listed property in the Old Town of Copenhagen, Denmark, consisting of a four-storey building from the 18th century fronting the street and a large, three-winged building from 1829 in the courtyard. J. G Schwart & Søn was from 1806 to 1983 based at the site. The entire complex was listed on the Danish registry of protected buildings and places in 1918. Harald Conrad Stilling's shop facade and interior from 1847 is part of the heritage listing.

== History ==
=== 18th century ===
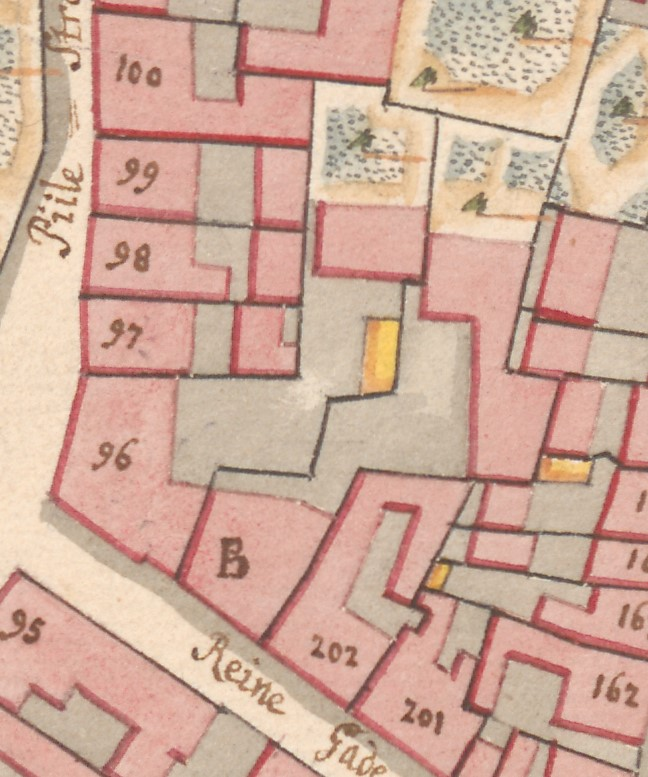
No. 96B seen on a detail from Christian Gedde's map of Jøbmager Quarter, 1757.

The site was formerly part of a large corner property, comprising what is now Sværtegade 1–3 and Pilestræde 42–44. This property was listed in Copenhagen's first cadastre of 1689 as No. 05 in Købmager Quarter and belonged to one Albert Hein's widow at that time.

The buildings on the site were destroyed in the Copenhagen Fire of 1728. The fire site was subsequently divided into three smaller properties. In c. 1750, by master builder Gotfrid Schuster constructed two two-storey houses with three-bay gabled wall dormers, one at present-day No. 3 and the other one at No. 1, were subsequently constructed at the site by master builder Gotfrid Schuster in c. 1730. The corner property was listed in the new cadastre of 1756 as No. 96 and was owned by mail official (pstforvalter) Jens Lange at that time. The property now known as Sværtegade 3 was marked as No. 96B on Christian Gedde's map of Købmager Quarter from 1757. The house at No. 3 was heightened by two storeys in 1791.

=== Hans Christian Ondrup ===
The property was later acquired by master mason Hans Christian Ondrup (1751–1814). His property was home to three households at the 1801 census.Hans Ondrup resided in the building with his wife Bolette Sophie Ondrup, two maids, a caretaker and the lodger Andreas Pind. Cathrine Rotbøll, a widow, resided in the building with her three children (aged seven to 20), one male servant and one maid. Adam Severin, a lawyer, resided in the building with his wife Ane Oppen, their two sons (aged nine and 18) and one maid. Johannes Wagner, a baskermaker, resided in the building with his wife Lene Olsdatter and their two children (aged six and ten).

Peder Bang, a wheelwright, resided in the rear wing at the 1801 census. He lived there with his wife Karen Johansdatterm their four children (aged three to eight), one maid, three wheelwrights (employees) and five apprentices. Lorentz Reistrup, a bookdealer, resided in the building with his wife Sophie Lassen, their three children (aged one to six) and two maids. Johan Prom, a grocer, (urtekræmmer), resided in the building with his wife Margrethe Allerup, an apprentice and a maid. Jochum Dosse, a baker, resided in the building with his wife Christiane Smidt and two children from her first marriage (aged four and 15).

The property was listed in the new cadastre of 1806 as No. 170 in Klædebo Quarter. It was still owned by Ondrup at that time.

=== 1806-1983: The Schwartz family ===
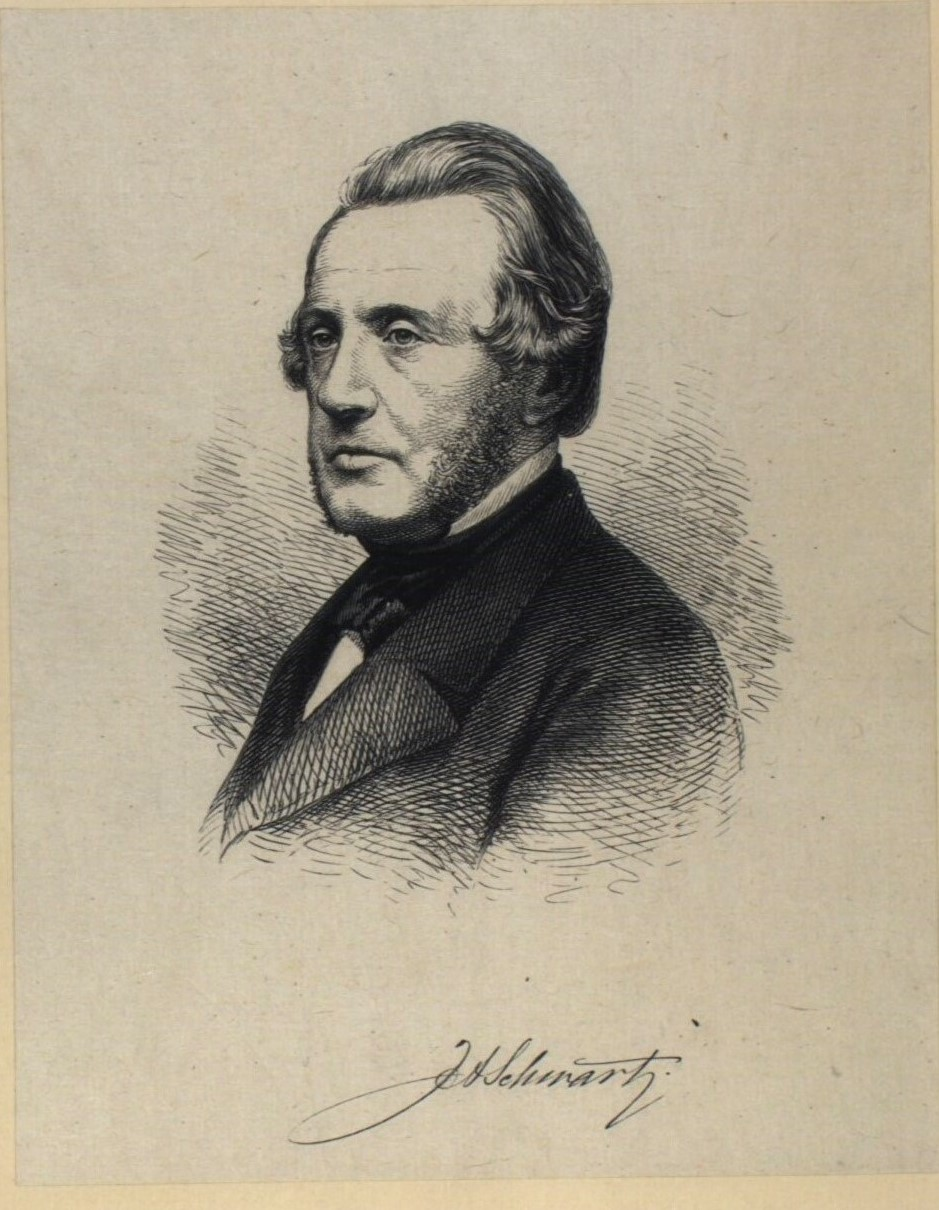
Johan Adam Schwartz

Sværtegade 3 was in 1806 acquired by turner Johan Adam Schwartz (1751–1835). He had become a partner in his old master S. I. Graumann's business back in 1801 and had after Graumann's death in 1704 married his widow and continued the workshop alone.

The workshop was after Schwartz's death in 1835 handed down to his nephew Johan Georg Schwartz (1789–1864). The name J. G. Schwartz & Søn was adopted in 1847 when his son Johan Adam Schwartz (1820–1874) was made a partner. The architect Hans Conrad Stilling was that same year charged with installing a modern shop in the ground floor of the building in Sværtegade.

Johan Adam Schwartz's widow Thora Louise Schwartz continued the operations after her husband's death until her own death the following year. The firm was then taken over by Frans Schwartz and H. E. Kllein. After Frans Swartz's death in 1917, it was converted into a limited company (aktieselskab.

=== Later history ===
In 1983, J. G. Swartz closed after trading from the same location for 177 years. The buildings were renovated into offices. In 2010, Bertlesen & Schewing was commissioned to restore and transform the building into a restaurant, hotel and office space.

== Architecture ==
=== Sværtegade 3 ===
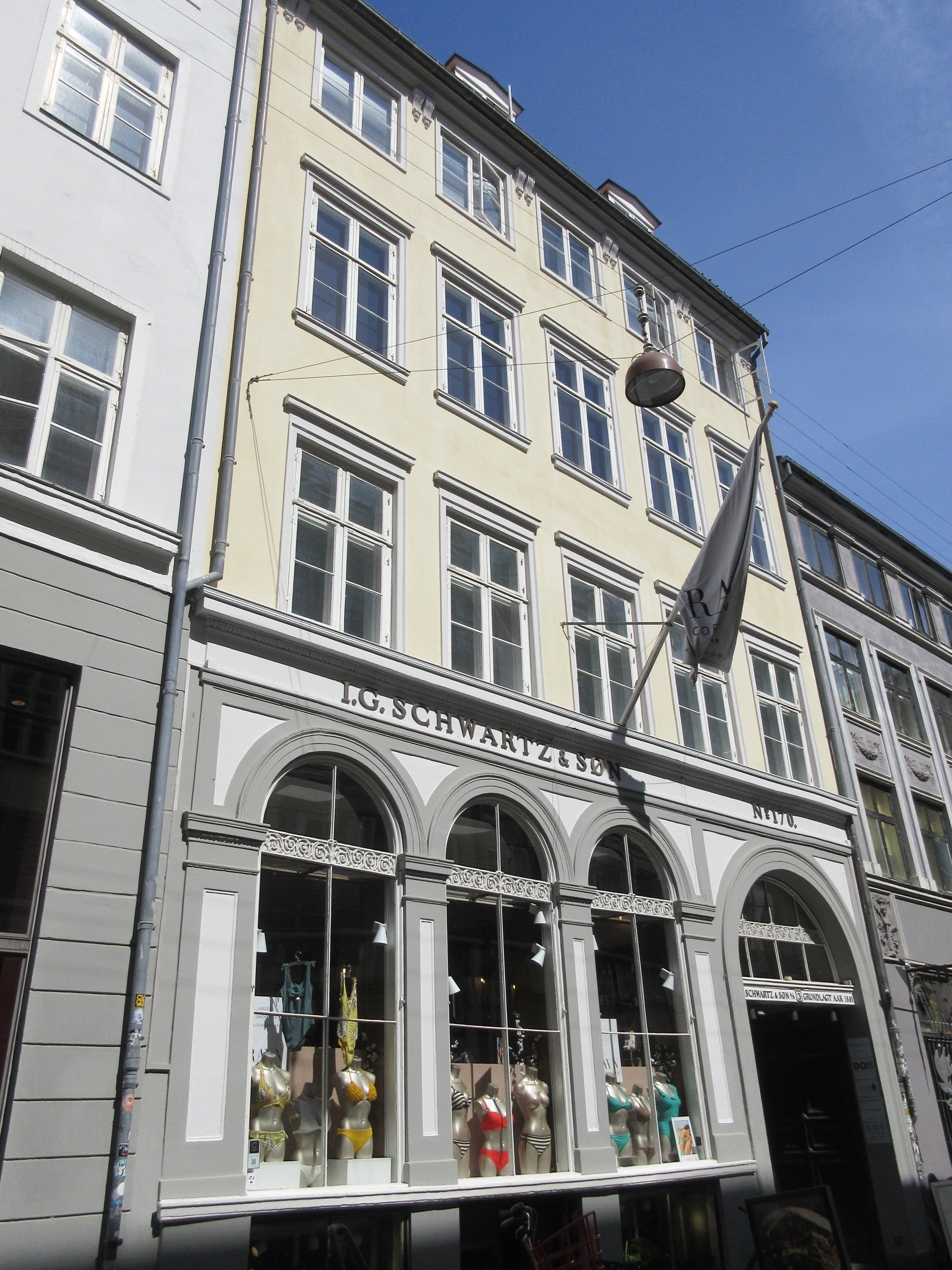
No. 3 in 2007

Being built on an irregularly shaped site, considerably deeper to the east (right) than to the west (left), Sværtegade 3 is five bays wide towards the street but six bays wide towards the yard. The facade towards the street is painted white. The name I. G. Schzartz & Søn is still seen on a band above the ground floor and the old house number (No. 170) is still seen above the gate. The facade is finished by a cornice supported by six sculpted corbels. The curved rear side of the building is painted yellow. The red tile roof features three zinc-clad dormer windows with white pediments.

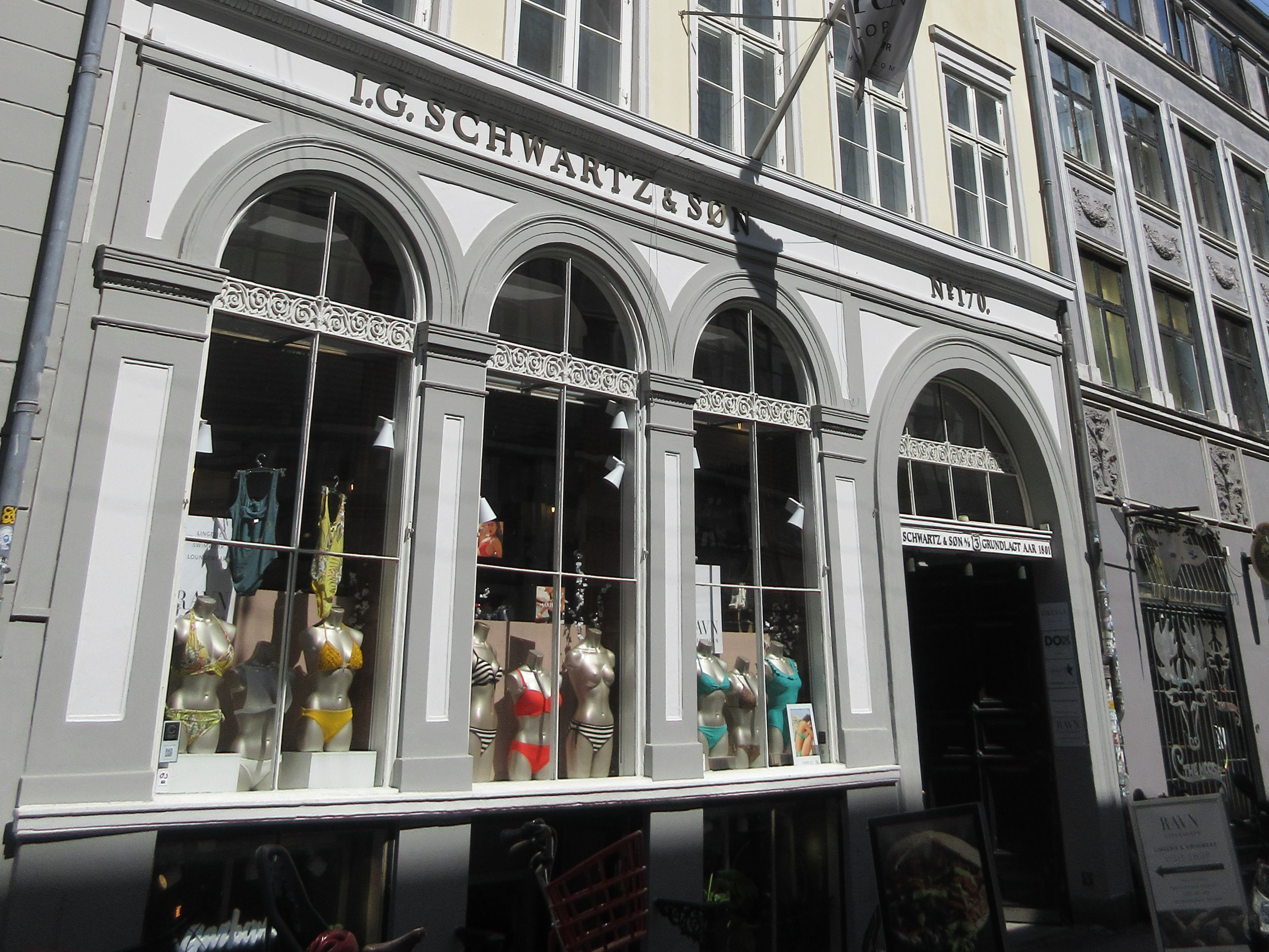
The shop front from 1847

The three large, arch-headed shop windows in the ground floor, a tell tale feature of commercial properties from the Late Neoclassical period (1830–1855), were a novelty in Denmark at the time. The tracery bars were necessary since it was still not possible to create larger window panes. Below the central shop window is a cellar entrance.

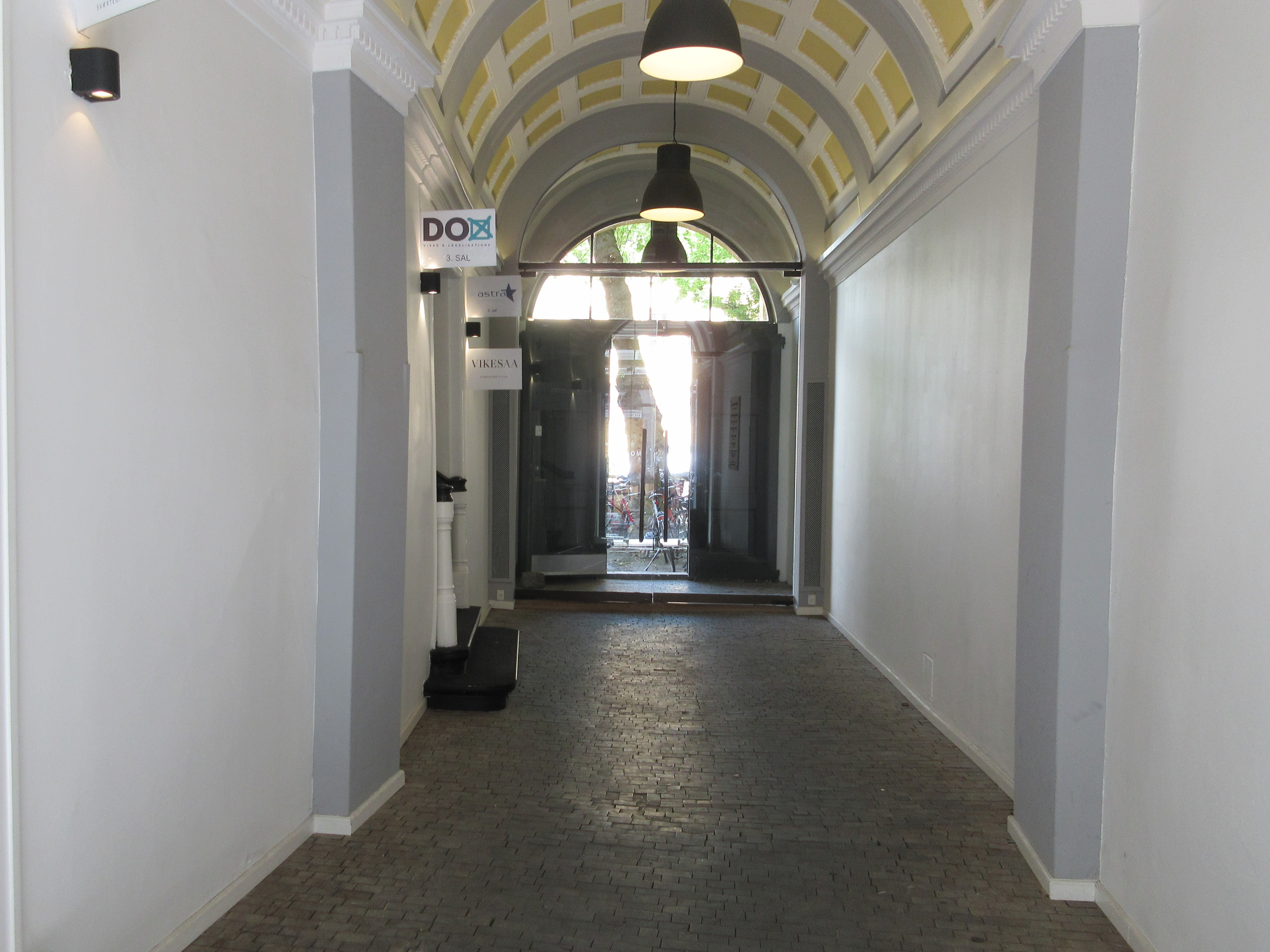
The gateway

The gate is topped by a Transom window. The transom features the name I. G. Schwartz & Søn as well followed by "Grundl. I 1801" )"Founded in 1801"). The gateway makes a suttle bend halfway through the building due to the irregular shape of the site and is towards the yard placed in a curved part of the facade. Its barrel vaulted ceiling is richly decorated and the walls are decorated with pilasters with capitels. The floor is paved with timber blocks. A door-less opening in the gateway's wall affords access to the building's main staircase.

=== Pilestræde 40C ===
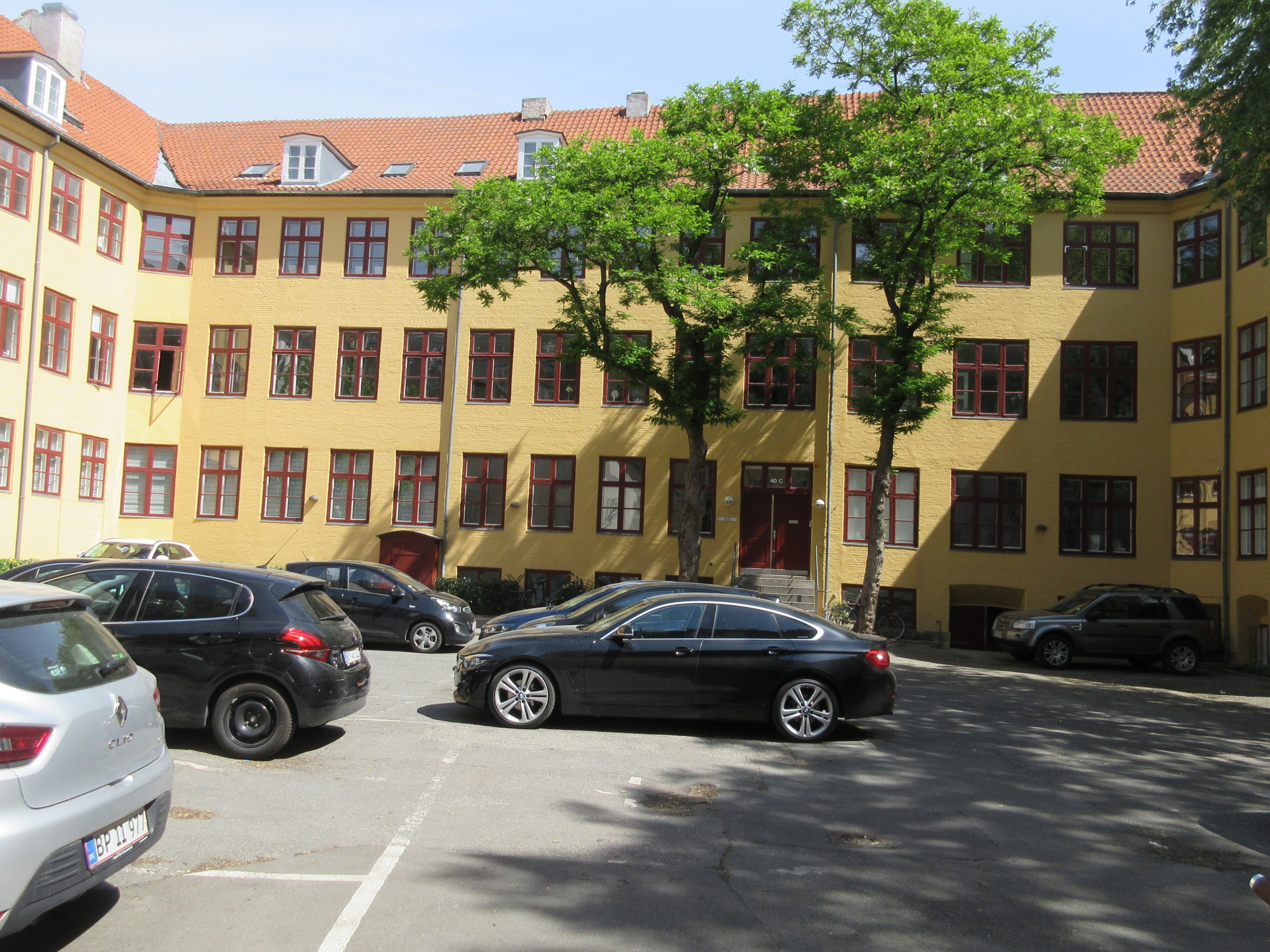
The building in the courtyard

The building in the courtyard (Pilestræde 40C), a long, three-storey building constructed on a foundation of stone ashlars, forms the northn margin of the courtyard. It consists of a 12-bay main wing flanked by two shorter side wings of which the eastern side wing is attached to the rear side of Sværtegade 5. The three easternmost bays of the main wing are wider than the others. The western side wing is four bays long and has a mono-pitched roof. The eastern side wing consists of three bays, a rounded corner bay and one bay in the gable.

== Today ==
Sværtegade 3 and the adjacent building at No. 1 were both acquired by Odense-based Barfoed Group in 2010.

== Gallery ==
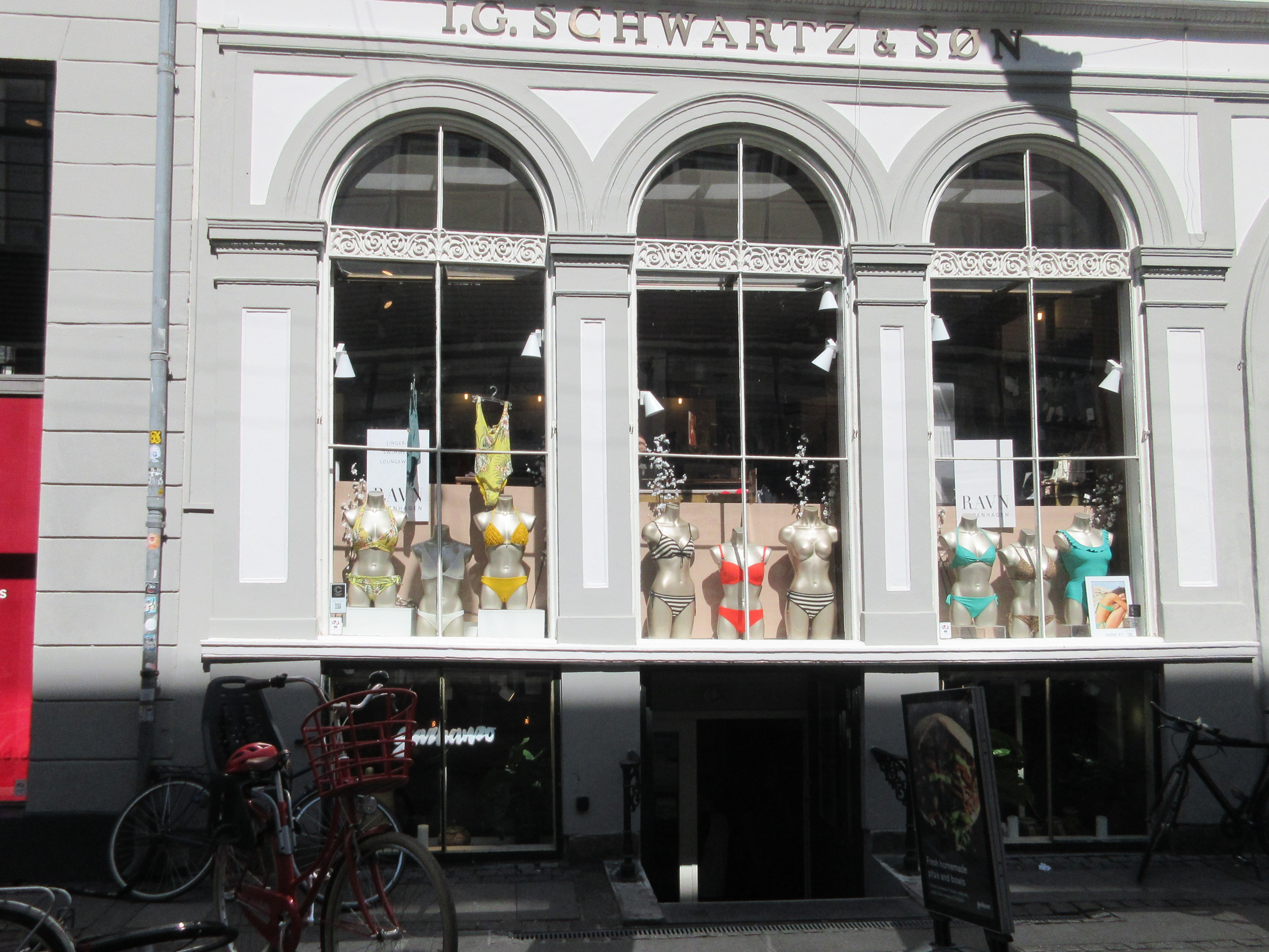
Sværtegade 3: Display windows

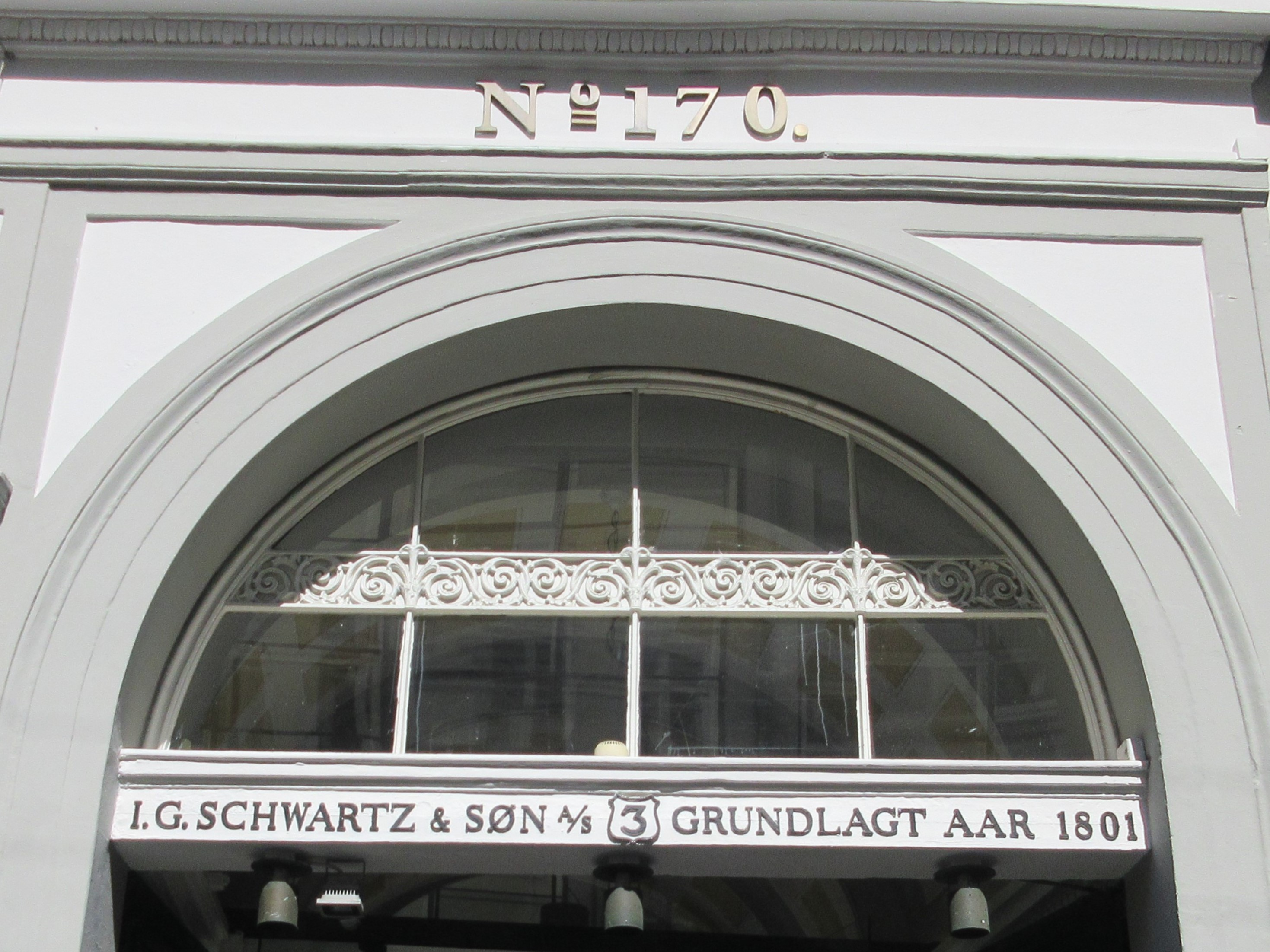
Sværtegade 3: Transom window above the gate

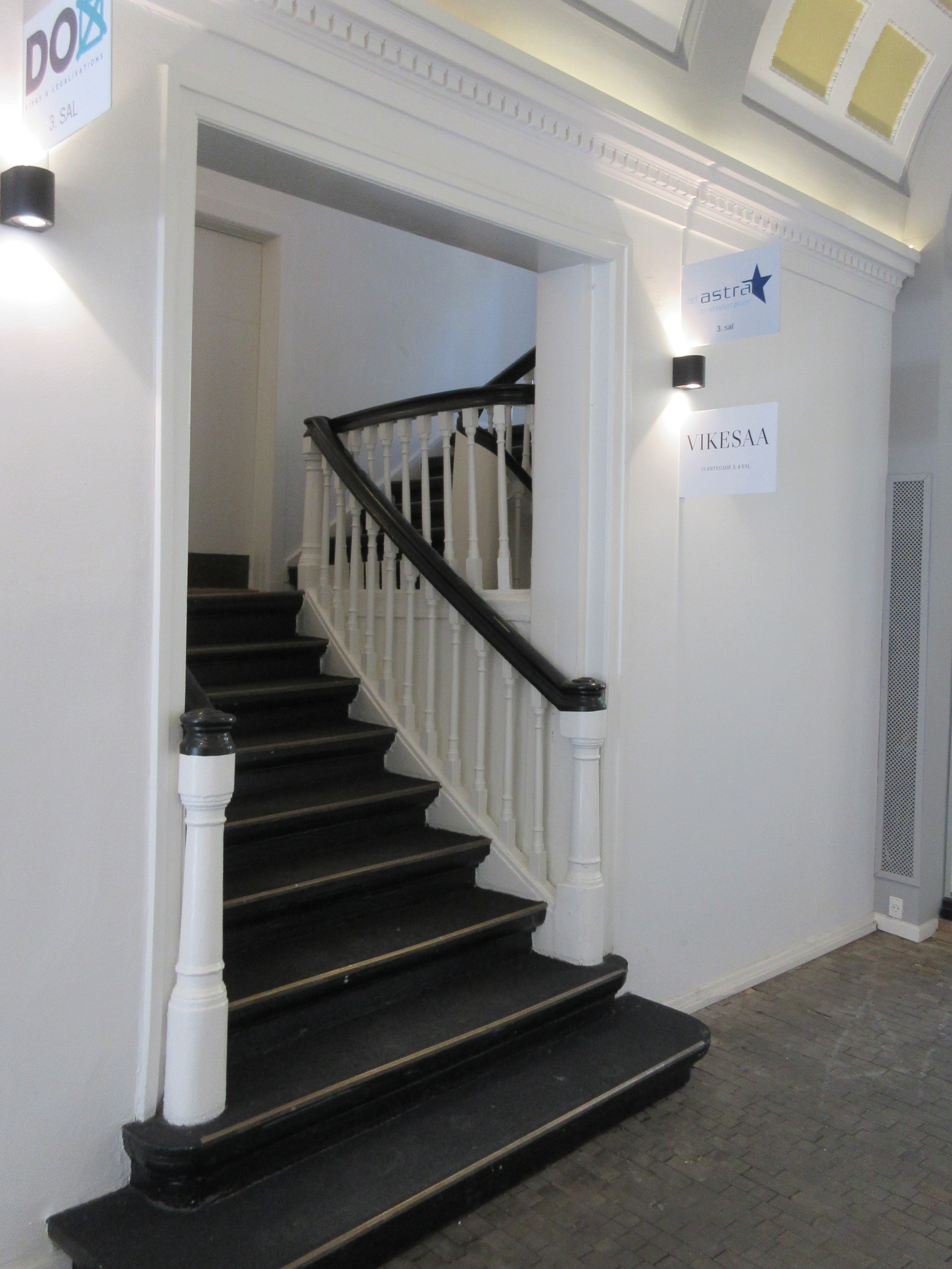
Sværtegade 3: The staircase

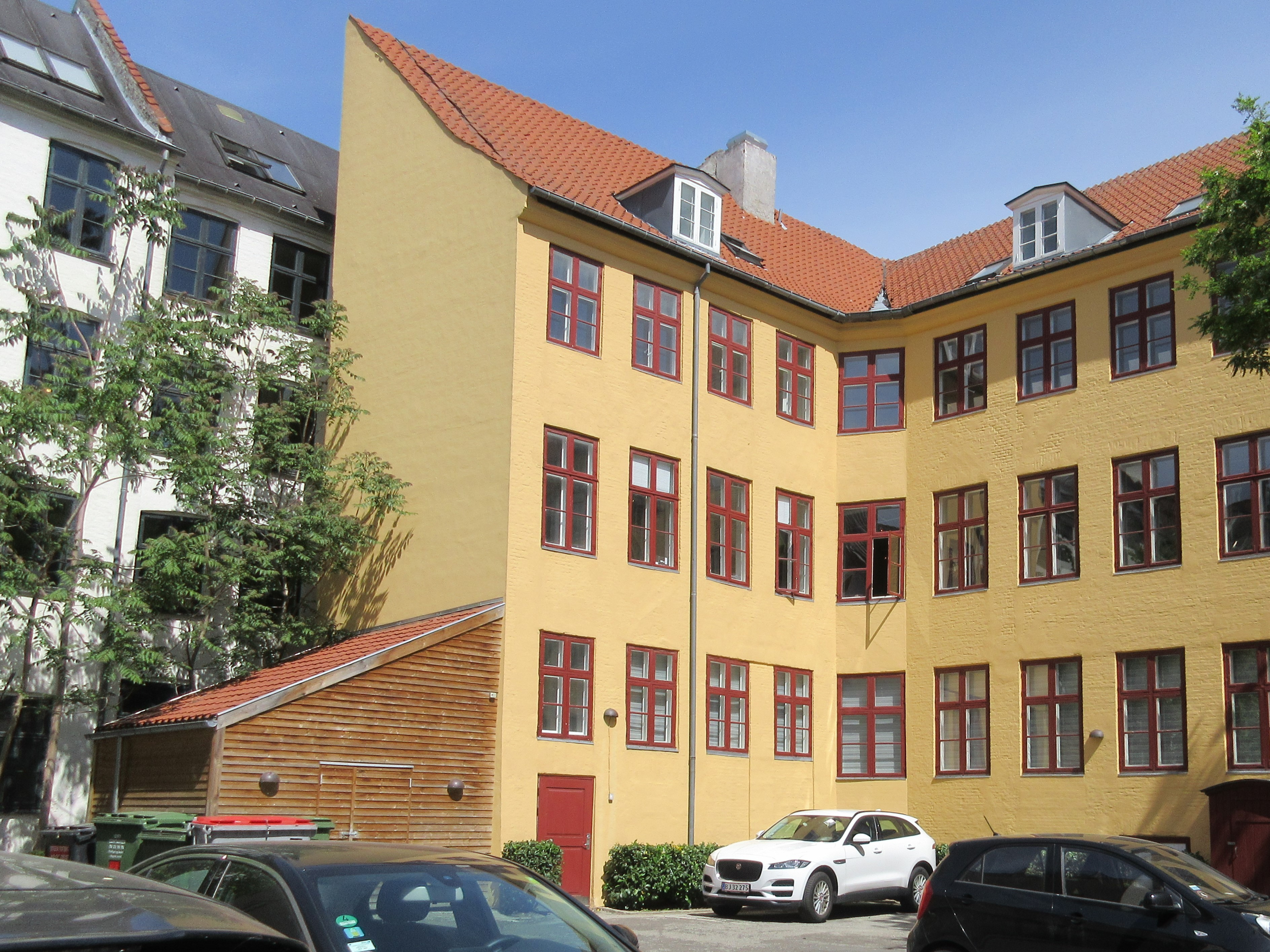
Pilestræde 40C: The western side wing

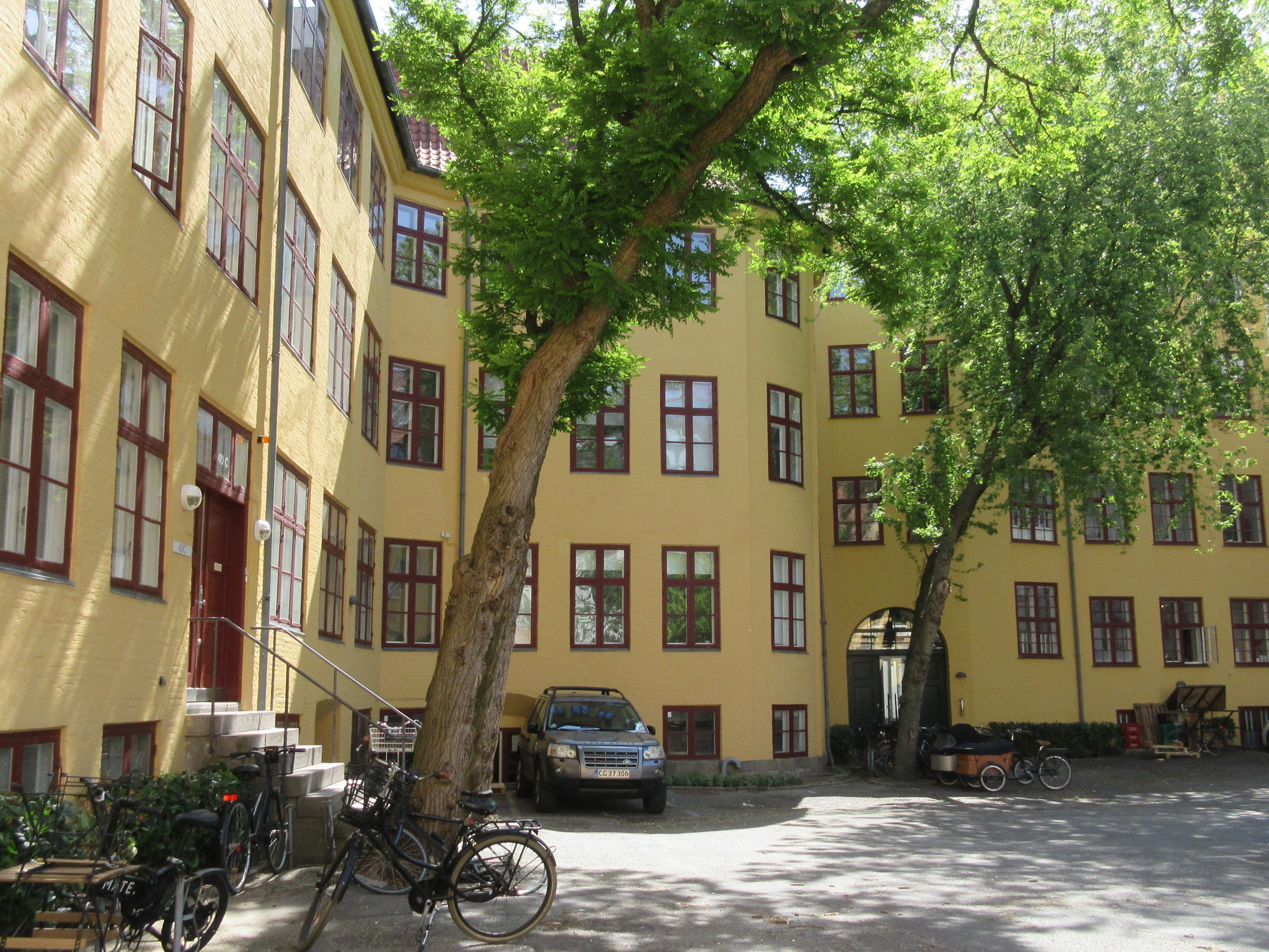
Pilestræde 40C: The eastern side wing

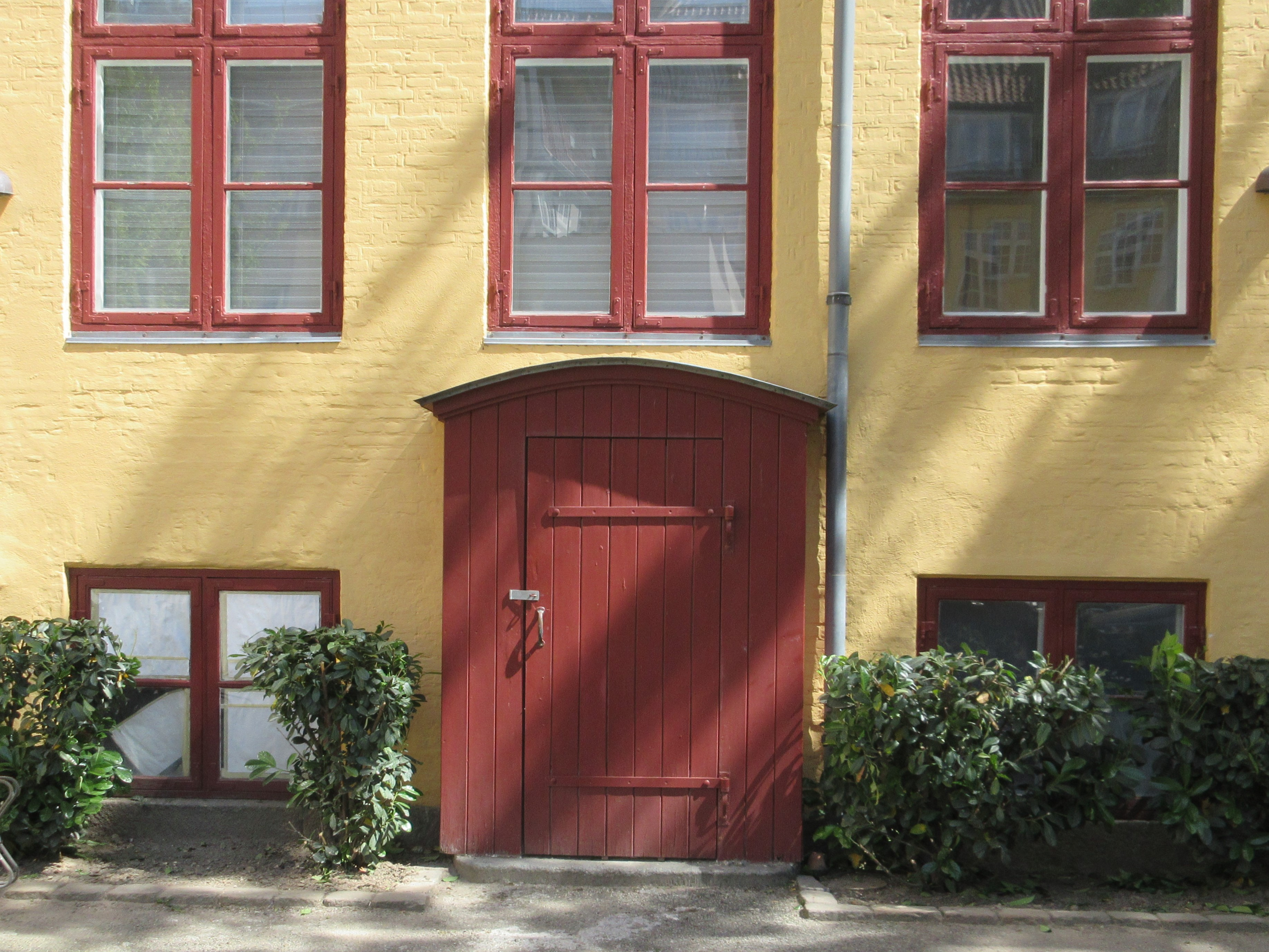
Pilestræde 40C: Cellar entrance
