= Harald Conrad Stilling =

Danish architect

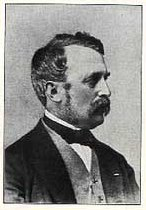
- Born: 9 February 1815; Hørsholm, Denmark
- Died: 29 November 1891 (aged 76); Frederiksberg, Denmark
- Education: Royal Danish Academy of Fine Arts
- Occupation: Architect
- Awards: C. F. Hansen Medal

Harald Conrad Stilling (9 February 1815 – 29 November 1891) was a Danish architect who was active in Copenhagen during the Late Classical period of the mid-18th century. He received the C. F. Hansen Medal in 1841.

== Early life and education ==
Stilling was born in Hørsholm. His father Conrad Frederik Stilling (1766 – 1821) was cup-bearer for Prince Christian Frederik and his mother Juliane Sofie née Hinzpeter (1777 – 1849) was the daughter of the steward at Hirschholm Palace. He spent his first childhood years in his maternal grandfather's home and was then sent to school in Copenhagen before completing a mason's apprenticeship in 1933. He spent the next few years working as a mason in the summer time and studying under Gustav Friedrich Hetsch both privately and at the Royal Danish Academy of Fine Art. He won the academy's small silver in 1839, its large silver medal in 1840, its small gold medal for the design of a country house in 1843 and its large gold medal for the design of an arsenal in 1847. He worked as an assistant for G.F. Hetsch in 1836–42.

== Career ==
Stilling's first independent works were for Georg Carstensen in Tivoli Gardens. For Carstensen he later also designed the now demolished Casino Theatre in Amaliegade. Another prominent client was I. C. Jacobsen for whom he designed several buildings at his new Carlsberg brewery.

Stilling served as building inspector in Copenhagen in 1856–71 and city architect (stadsbygmester) from 1872–87.

== Selected buildings ==
- Tivoli Gardens. Copenhagen(1843–45, mostly demolished)
- Casino Theatre, [[Amaliegade]] 10, Copenhagen (1845–47, demolished in 1960)
- Kongens Klub, Vesterbros Passage, Copenhagen (1845, demolished)
- Hippodromen (now Folketeatret), Nørregade 39 (1846)
- Carlsberg Brewery (now Gammel Carlsberg), Valby, Copenhagen (1846–47, listed)
- Maglekilde Vandkuranstalt, Roskilde (1846, demolished)
- J.G. Schwartz (facade and shop), Sværtegade 3m Copenhagen (1847)
- Copenhagen Station, Dronningens Enghave, Copenhagen (1847, demolished in 1865)
- Frederiksholms Kanal 16–18, Copenhagen (1851–52, listed)
- Tower and porch, Tyvelse Church, Denmark(1854)
- Folketeatret (conversion of Hippodromen), Nørregade 39, Copenhagen (1855–57)
- Sommerlyst (main building), Frederiksberg Allé 98, Frederiksberg (1855, later Avenue Teatret, demolished)
- Kongens Nytorv 17m Copenhagen (1856–57, altered in 1961)
- Schønbergsgade 15, Frederiksberg (1857, listed)
- Villa Tharand for Luis Bramsen (later Det Wærnske Institut, Mariaforbundet and Kastanievejs Efterskole), Kastanievej 2, Frederiksberg (1857, expanded in 1905 and later altered)
- Københavns Sygehjem (now part of UCPH's Frederiksberg Campus, Rolighedsvej, Frederiksberg (1857–59, expanded by Stilling 1877–78 and listed in 1959)
- Carolineskolen, Pilestræde 48 (1860)
- Østifternes Kreditforening (now Øjenlægernes Hus), Store Kannikestræde 16 (1860)
- Bikuben (alterations), Silkegade 8, Copenhagen (1860–61, demolished)
- Thors Hal (later Figaro/Valencia), Vesterbrogade 32, Copenhagen (1861, partly demolished in 1890)
- Tivoli Concert Hall (alterations), Tivoli Gardens, Copenhagen (1863, with J.A. Stillmann, altered)
- Bazaren, Tivoli Gardens, Copenhagen (1863, demolished in 1908)
- Ordruphøj, Ordrup (1863–64, demolished)
- Villa, Rosenvængets Hovedvej 18, Rosenvænget (1865, demolished in 1932)
- Sparekassen, Niels Hemmingsens Gade 7 (1862, altered)

´* St. Peter's Church (restoration), Copenhagen (1864–65)

- Kyø Hovedgård, Aalborg (1875)
