= Johan Schwartz =

Johan Schwartz may refer to:

- Johan Adam Schwartz (1820–1874), Danish turner
- Johan Jørgen Schwartz (1824–1898), Norwegian politician and businessperson
