= Julie Fagerholt =

Danish fashion designer

- Born: April 17, 1968 (age 57); Denmark
- Occupation: Fashion designer

Julie Fagerholt (born 17 April 1968) is a Danish fashion designer and founder of the luxury clothing brand Heartmade. She also creates haute couture. Her customers include Queen Mary of Denmark.

== Biography ==
Julie Fagerholt grew up in Skovshoved north of Copenhagen, the daughter of Ninja Tholstrup Bramsen, a child psychologist, and Nils Fagerholt, an architect and a professor at the Royal Danish Academy of Fine Arts. She completed her education at the Danish Design School in 1993. In 1998, she set up her company Heartmade in a courtyard on Pilestræde in Copenhagen.

Originally focusing on haute couture, the brand has mainly produced prét-à-porter collections since 2000. In 2000, her first collection won The Golden Button, a Danish fashion award. Her company has a flagship store at Pilestræde 45 in Copenhagen. Fagerholt ascribes some of her success to designing the kind of clothes she thinks she needs for herself, but she is also inspired by ethnic clothing, for example from India.
