= Johan Adam Schwartz =

Danish turner (1820–1874)

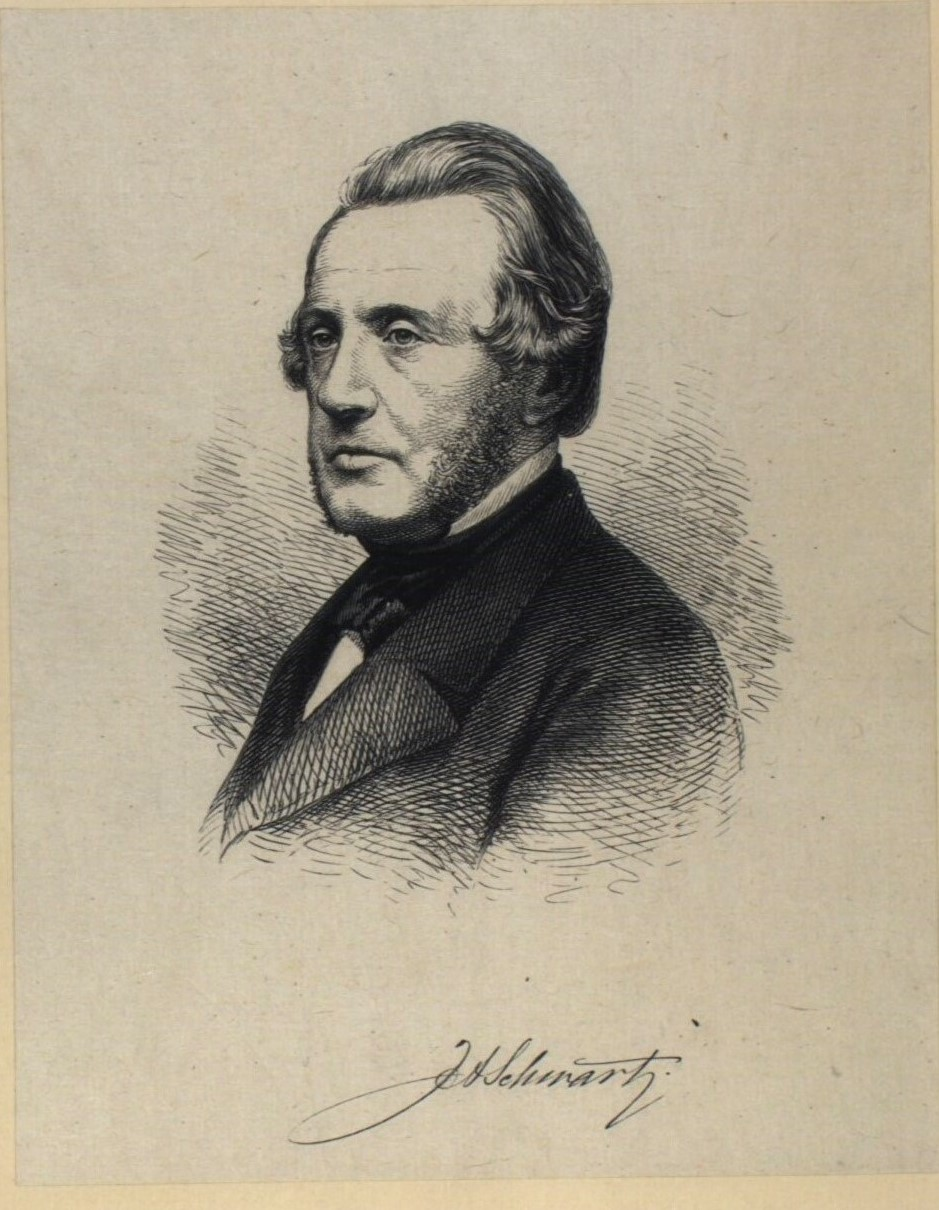
Johan Adam Schwartz

Johan Adam Schwartz (26 November 1820 – 31 December 1874) was a Danish turner. He succeeded his father as owner of the decorative arts firm I.G. Schwartz & Søn in Copenhagen and eventually handed it down to his own son Frans Schwartz. He was president of Industriforeningen from 1746 to 1751. A proponent of improved training of craftsmen in Denmark, he was involved in the establishment of both Industriskolen (The Industry School) and Håndværkerskolen (Craftsmen's School).

== Early life and background ==
Schwartz was born on 26 November 1820 in Copenhagen, the son of turner J. G. Schwartz (1789–1864) and Augusta M. Frels (1791–1885). He attended St. Petri School and Borgerdyd School. After his confirmation, he became an apprentice in his father's workshop at Sværtegade 3. Aged 17, he was sent on a study trip to Paris and London under supervision of the goldsmith Jørgen Balthasar Dalhoff, 20 years his senior, who saw to it that Schwartz diligently visited the cities' museums and manufactories, drawing what he saw.

== Career ==
On Schwartz' return to Denmark, he became an employee in his father's workshop, chiefly with responsibility for its aesthetic and artistic direction but also as the one with the knowledge of writing that his father had never acquired. He completed his masterpiece and was granted citizenship in 1846, and was the following year made a partner in his father's business which from then on traded as I. G. Schwartz & Søn.

== Other occupations ==
Already in 1839, aged 18, Schwartz published an article in the magazine Søndagen in which he argued in favour of an improved training of craftsmen. The article instigated a discussion in Industriforeningen which, chiefly at Schwartz's initiative, in 1841, resulted in the establishment of Industriskolen in Snaregade. Schwartz became a member of Industriforeningen's board of representatives (repræsentantskab) in 1842, was a member of a number of its committees, including the Committee for Sunday Meetings for Young Craftsmen 1847–1849, and was president of the association from 1857 to 1861. He worked to afford artists more influence on craftsmen's work. He was an enthusiastic supporter of G. F. Hetsch's efforts to integrate art and craftsmanship. Teaching by his own example, in his own workshop he often collaborated with artists, especially the sculptor C. Peters.

Schwartz was a member of the Copenhagen City Council from 1859 to 1865. He was also a member of Kunstflidslotteriet, a lottery established in 1860 to contribute to the rebuilding of Frederiksborg Castle. He was together with Vilhelm Klein responsible for the preparation of Håndværkerskolen in 1868. He was also elected the same year as a member of Arbejdernes Byggeforening.

== Personal life and legacy ==
Schwartz married Thora Lovise Kühl (16 February 1816 – 8 March 1875), a daughter of auditor and Livjæger captain Casper Joachim Kyhl (1790–1853) and Louise Dorothea Frels (1793–1880), on 23 February 1847.

Schwartz was created a Knight in the Order of the Dannebrog in 1752. He died on 31 December 1874 and is buried in Assistens Cemetery. I. F. Schwartz & Søn was continued by his son Frans Schwartz.

The street J.A. Schwartz Gade in Kartoffelrækkerne is named after him.
