= Sværtegade =

Street in Copenhagen

Coordinates: 55.6811°N 12.5803°E

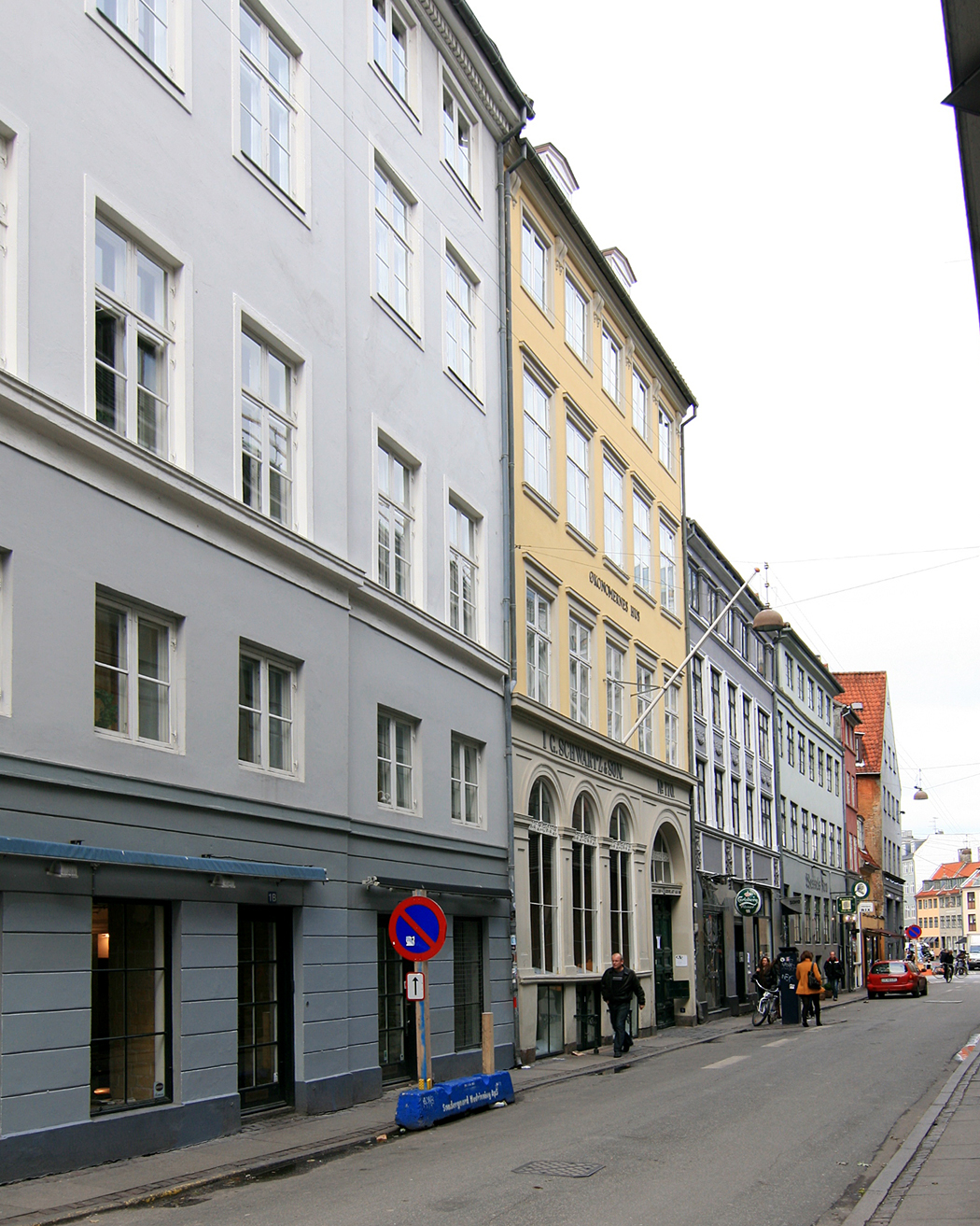
Sværtegade

Sværtegade is a street in the Old Town of Copenhagen, Denmark. It connects Pilestræde to Gammel Mønt.

== History ==
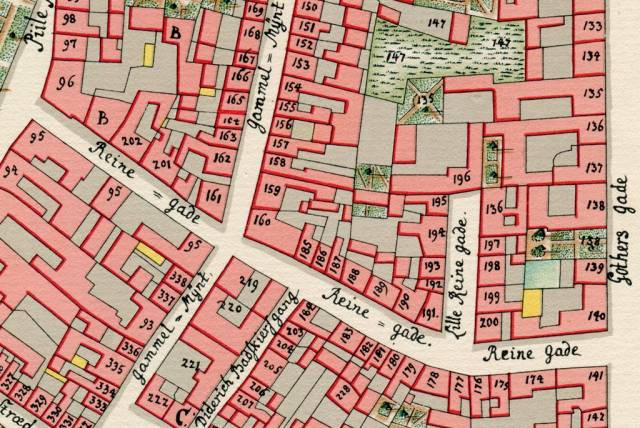
Regnegade seen on Gedde's district map of Købmager Quarter, 1757.

Until 1665, the street was called Gjethusstræde after Gjæthuset, a canon foundry located in the former St. Getrud's Abbey. The name was then Regnegade until 1773 when the street received its current name. The origins of the name, which directly translates as "Soot Street", is unclear. It may have referred to the blackened workers from the canon foundry.

== Notable buildings and residents ==
There are five listed buildings in the street. No. 5 (1732) and 7 (1729) were built for captain Ernst Brandt. No. 7 was later home to the Norwegian Society, a literary society for Norwegian students in Copenhagen which existed from 1772 until 1913. Among the members were Johan Herman Wessel. A plaque commemorating him was installed on the building by the Norwegian Society in Oslo in 1992.

No. 3 was built by Gotfrid Schuster in 1730 and extended with two floors in 1792. No. 9 is from 1736 and was extended with an extra floor in 1847. No. 11 is also from the 1730s and is supposedly the smallest house in Copenhagen's Old Town..

== Gallery ==
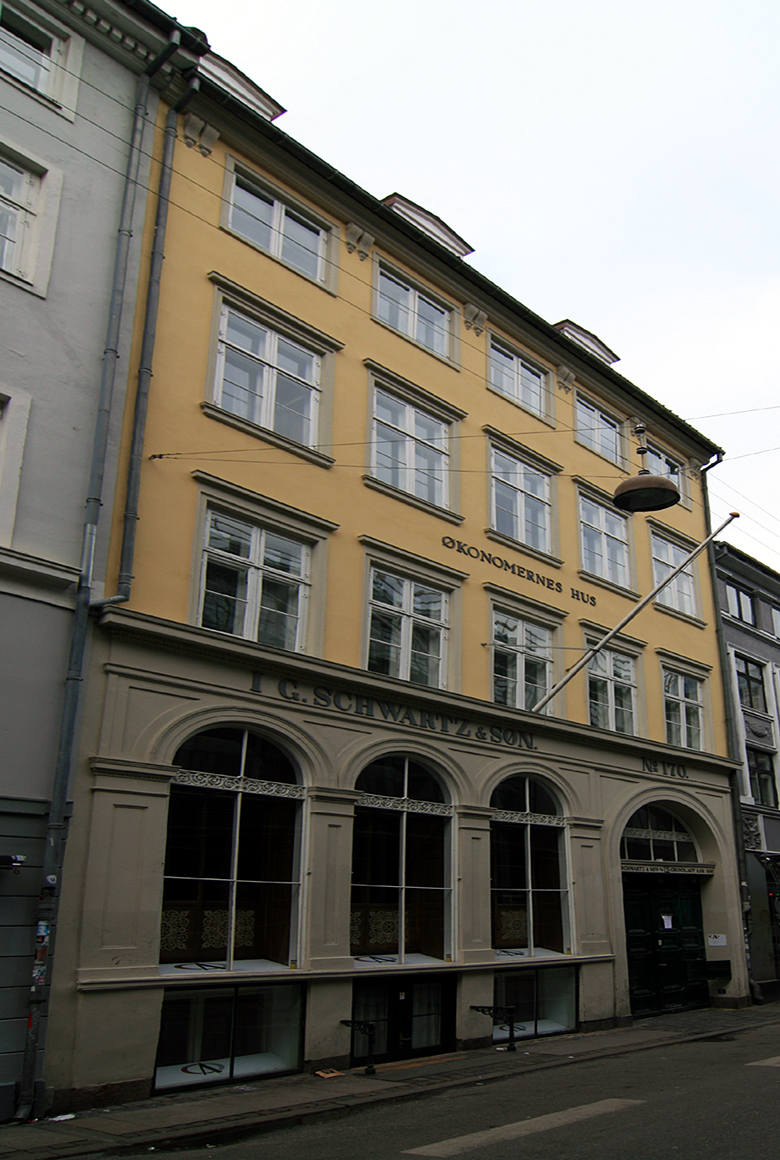
Sværtegade 3

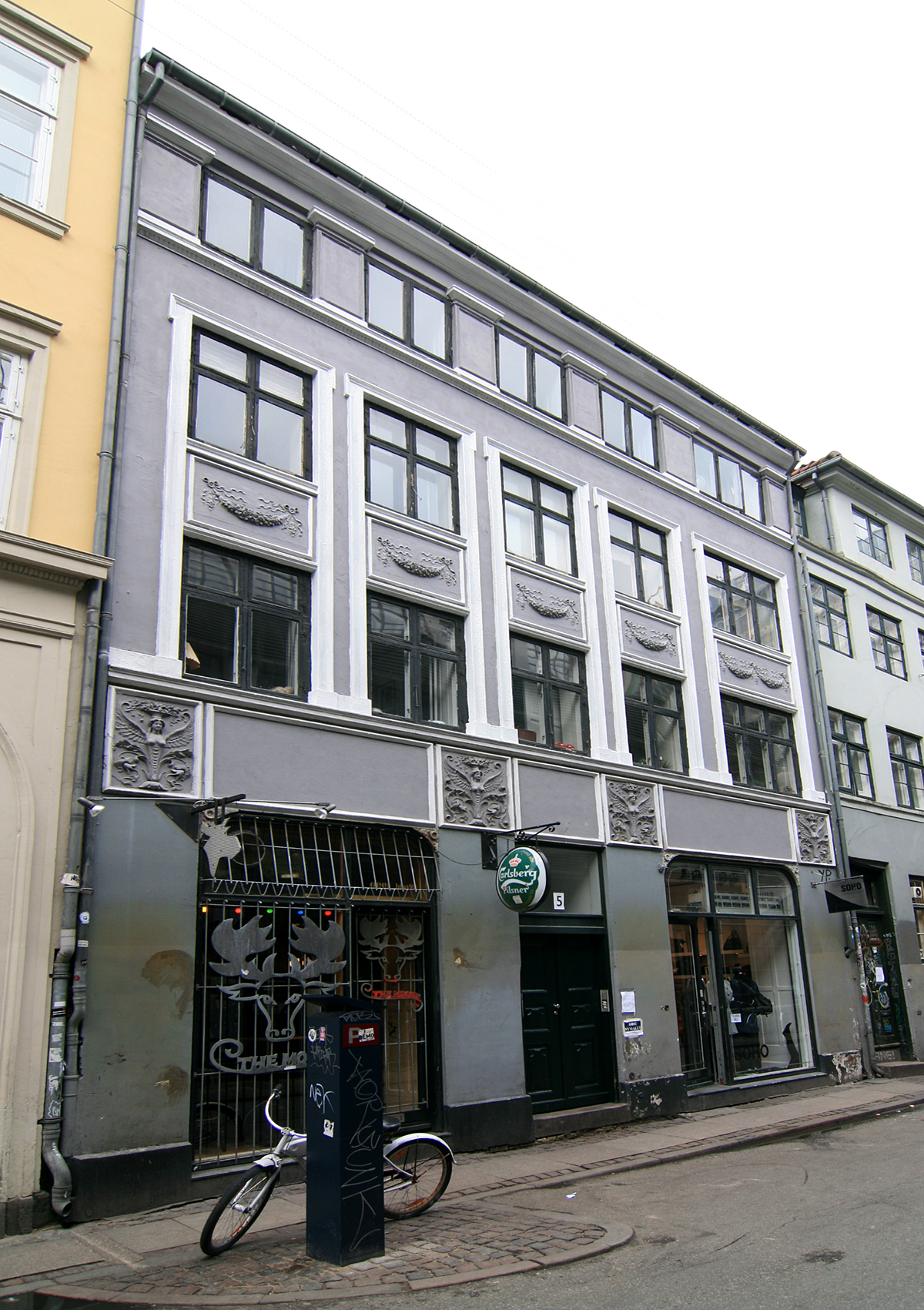
No. 5 from 1732

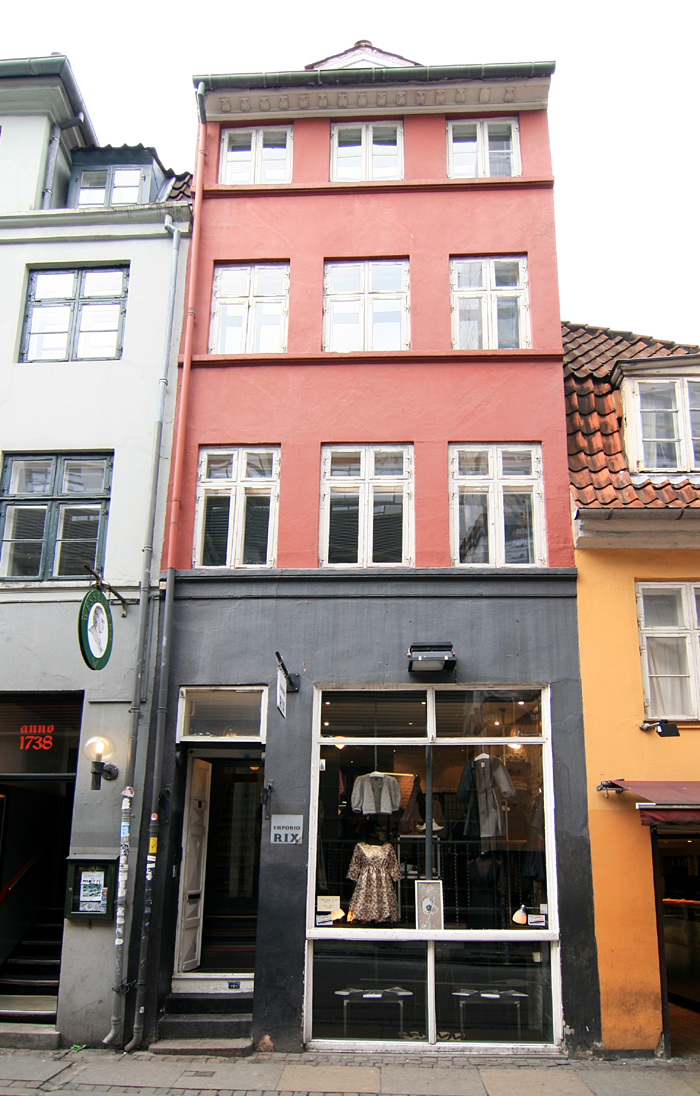
No. 9

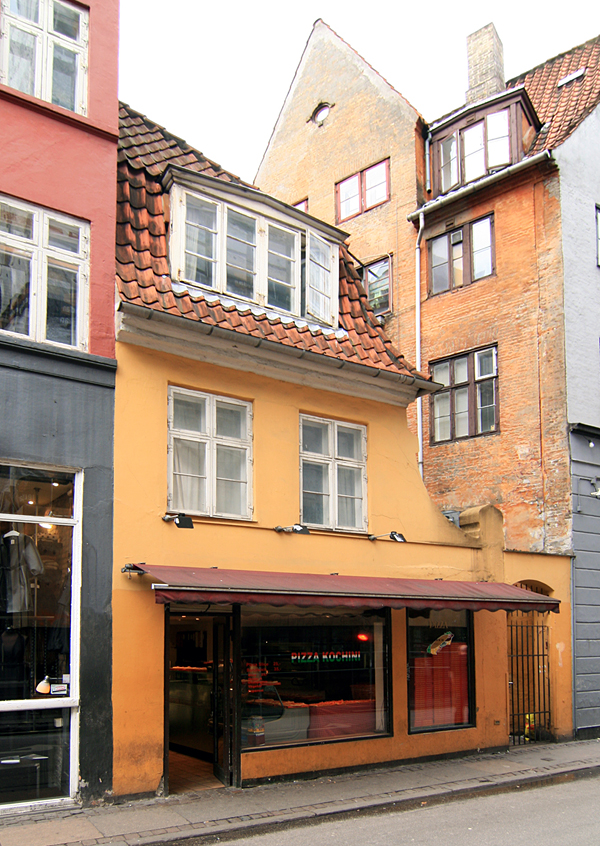
No. 11
