= Frans Schwartz =

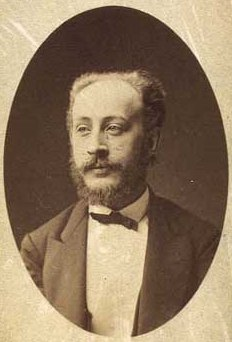

Johan Georg Frans Schwartz (19 July 1850 – 13 February 1917) was a Danish artist. He worked mainly on human figures and portraiture apart from some religious themes. He worked on murals as well as an etcher for book illustrations.

Schwartz was born in Copenhagen to art dealer Johan Adam Schwarz. He worked with his father and later decided to train in art and joined the Academy of Fine Arts in 1866 and completed in 1872. In 1878 he travelled around Europe, mainly Spain and founded a private art school. In 1883 he worked on the ceiling paintings at Frederiksborg Castle and in 1897 at the Glyptotek. He also worked on etchings and book illustrations.

Schwartz donated his wealth to support the artistic improvement of Copenhagen's public buildings. He is buried at Assistens Cemetery.

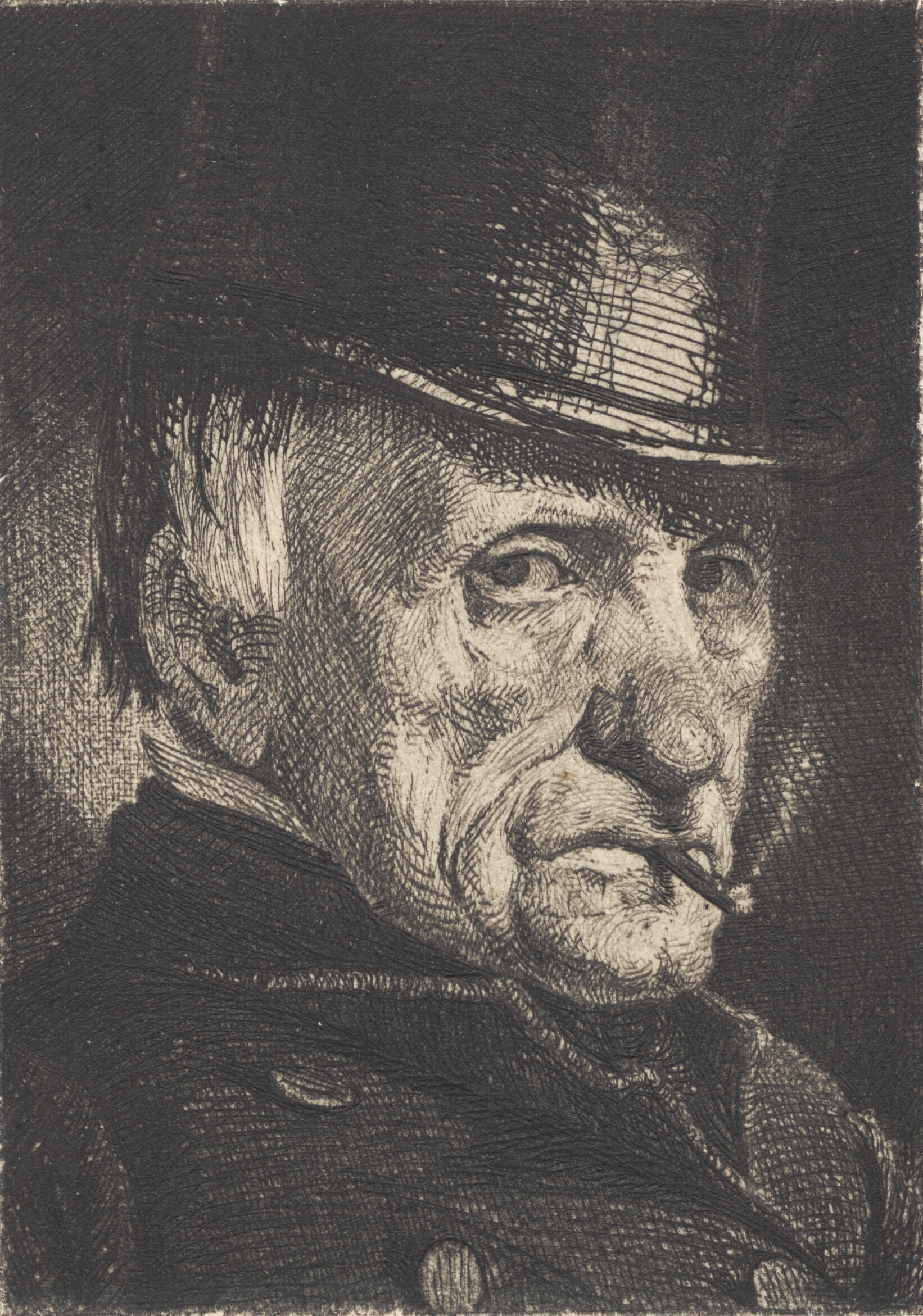

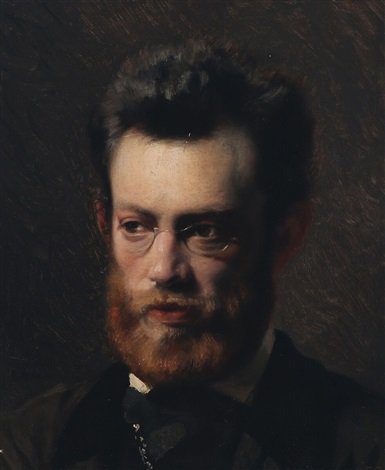
Valdemar Irminger, 1888

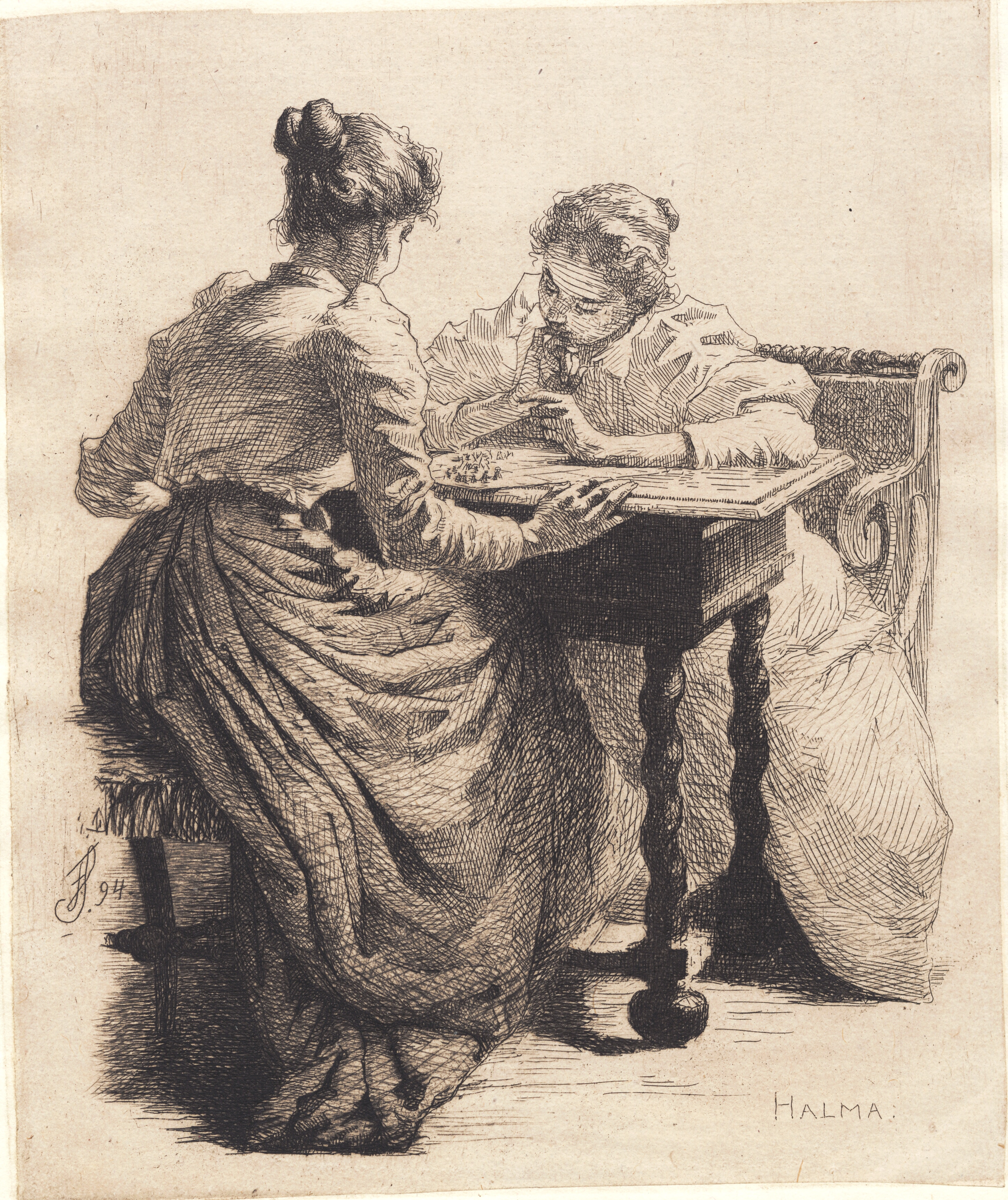
Halma, 1894

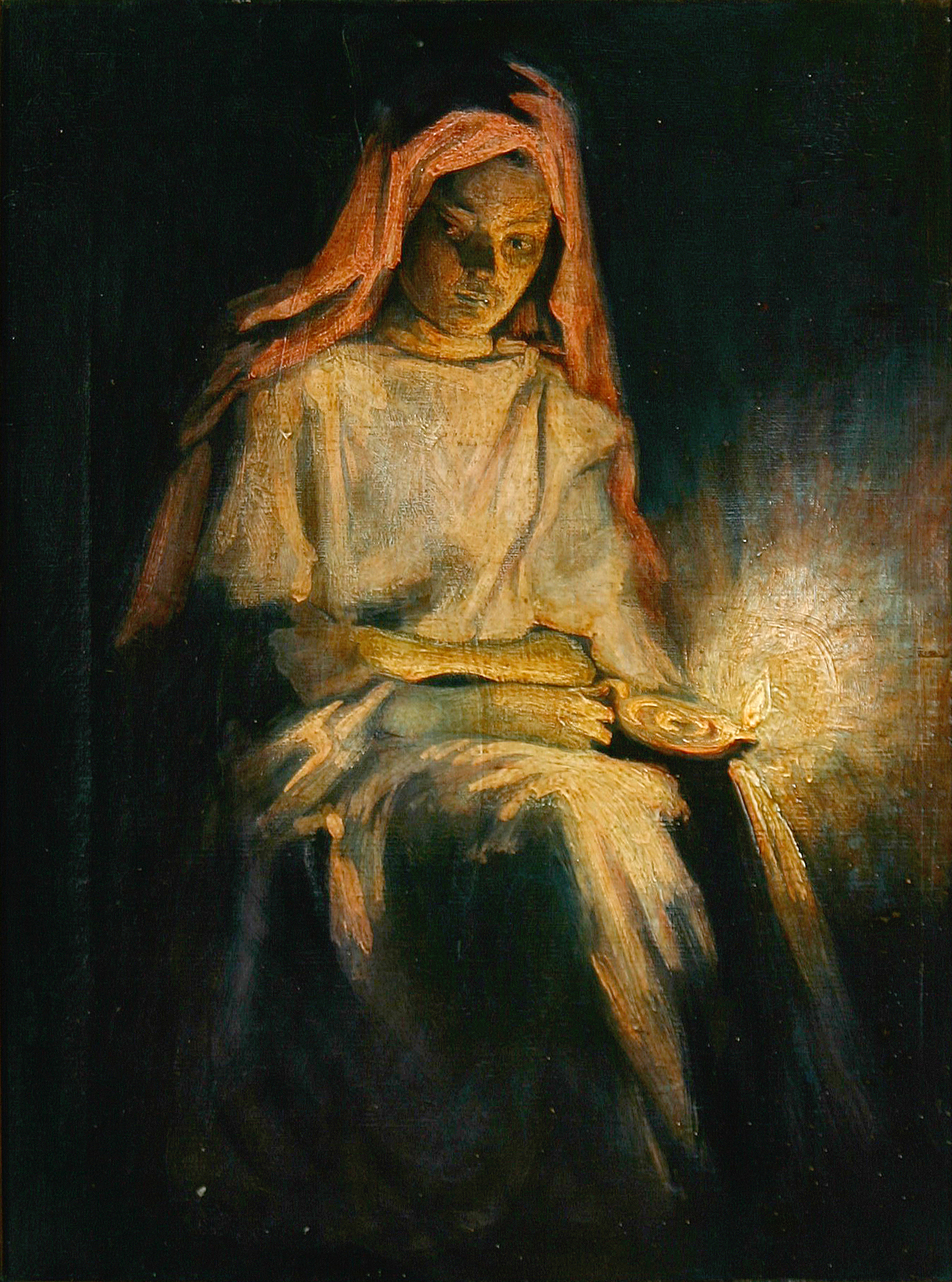
Pigen med lampen, ca. 1894

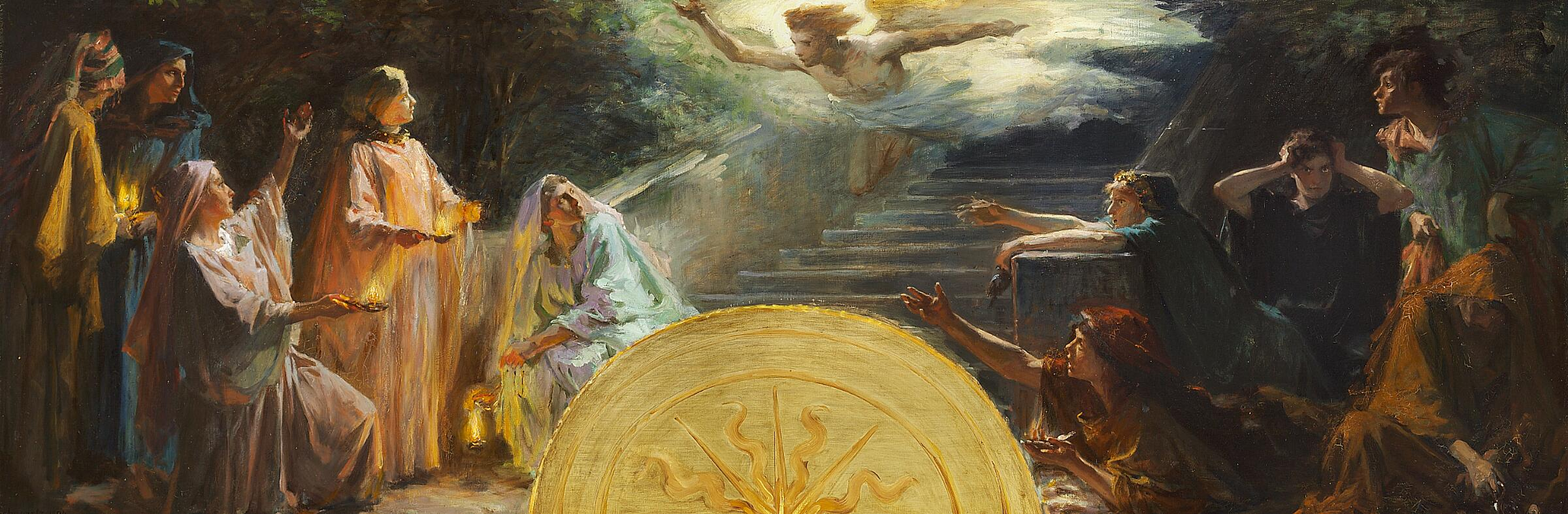
De kloge og de tåbelige brudepiger, 1894

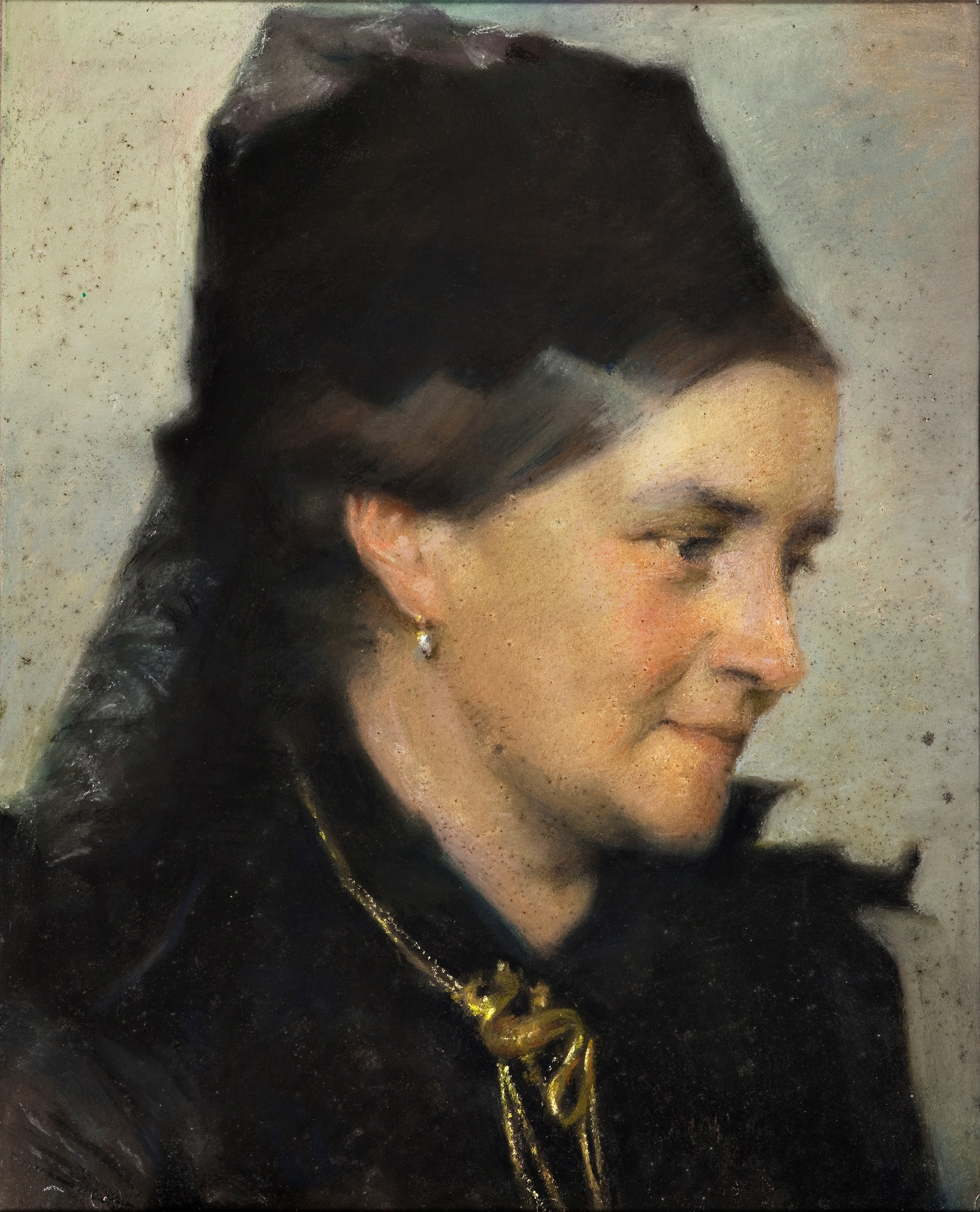
Vilhelmine (Ville) Heise, f. Hage (1838–1912)

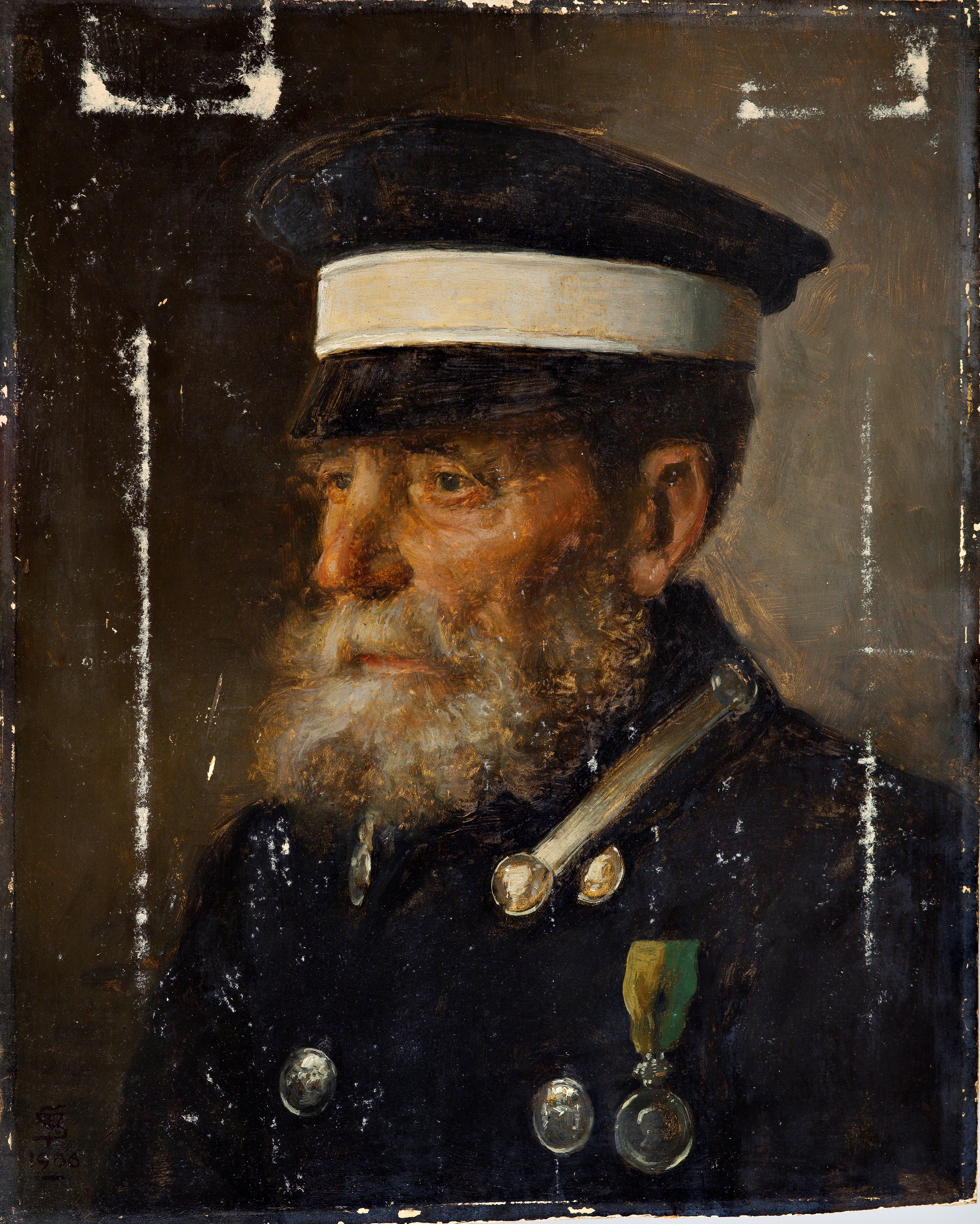
Kusken Jöns, 1906

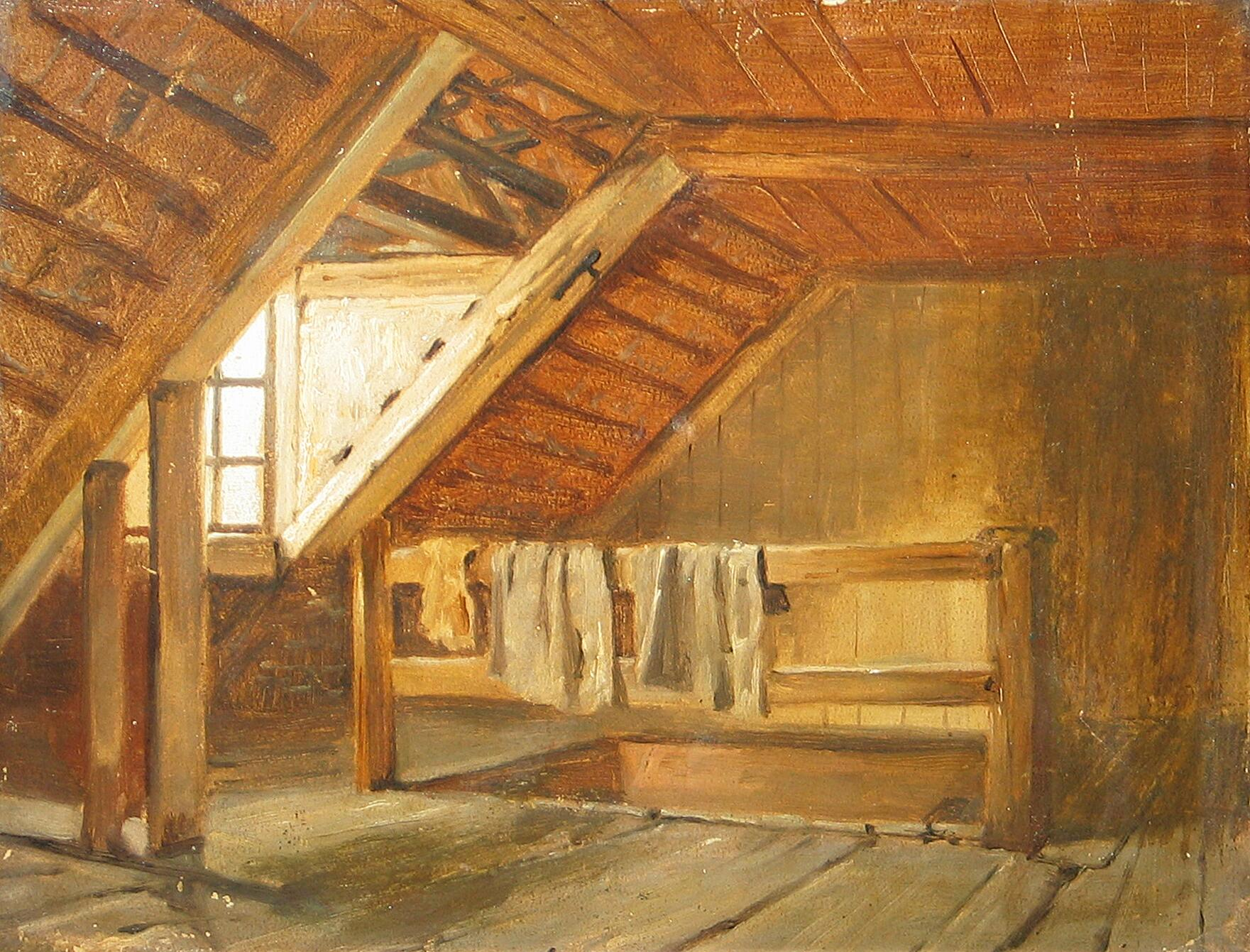
Interiør fra et tørreloft.

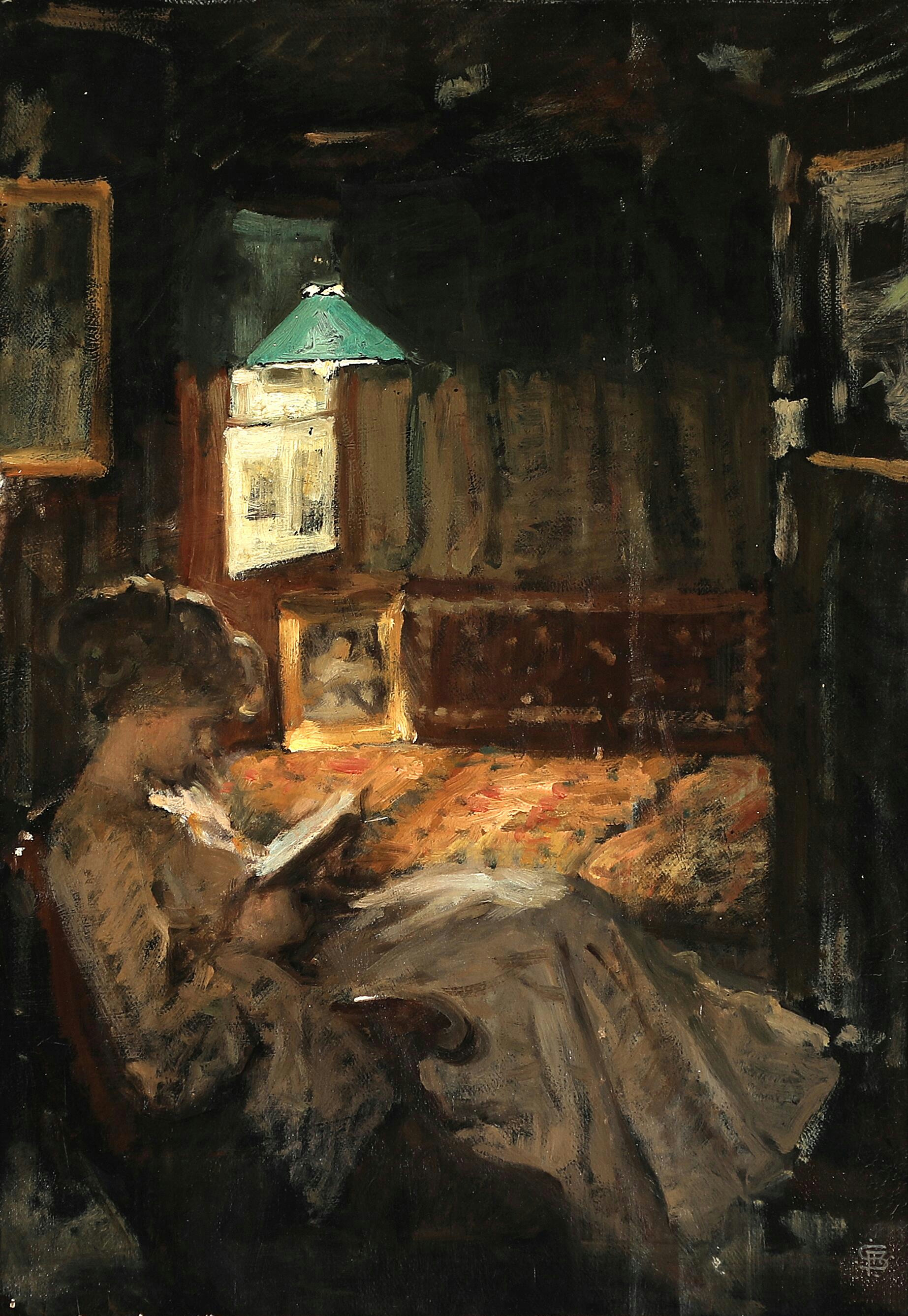
En ung kvinde læser i lampens skær

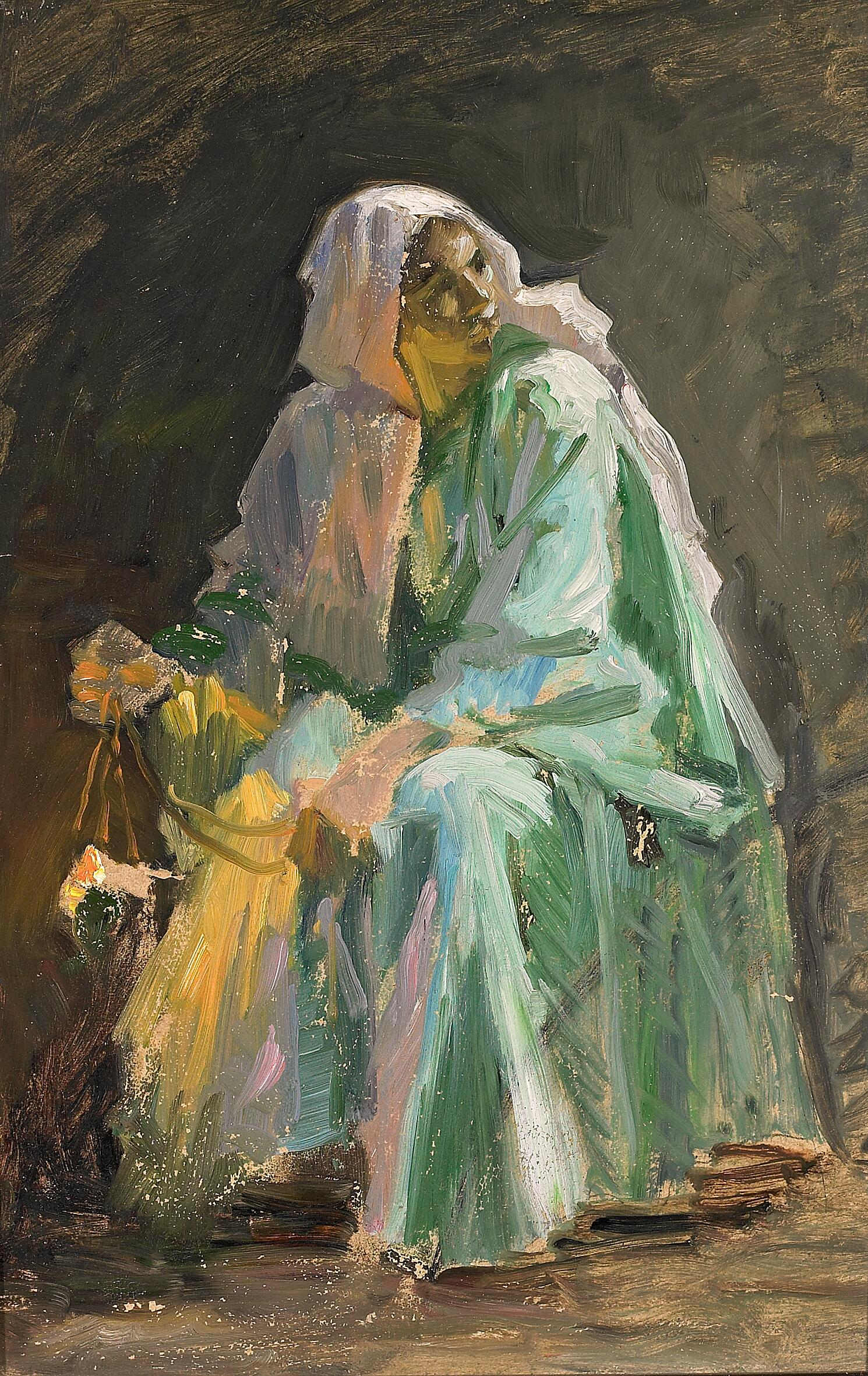
Orientaler i grøn dragt
