= Pilestræde =

Street in Copenhagen, Denmark

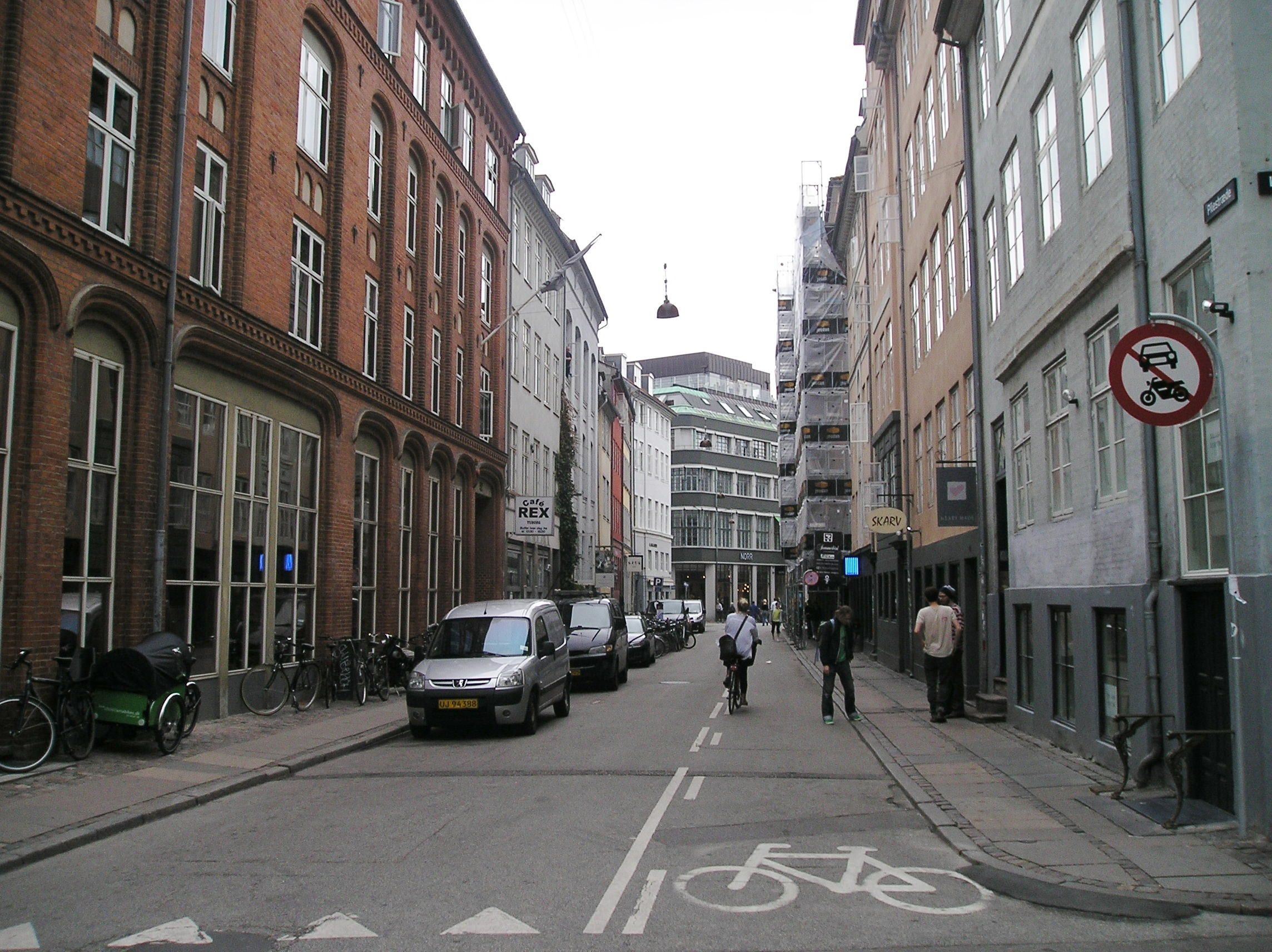
- Length: 455 m (1,493 ft)
- Location: Indre By, Copenhagen, Denmark
- Postal code: 1112
- Nearest metro station: Gammel Strand
- Coordinates: 55°40′53.04″N 12°34′43.68″E

Pilestræde (lit. English: Willow Alley) is a street in central Copenhagen, Denmark. It is a side street to the pedestrianized shopping street Strøget and commonly associated with the newspaper publishing house Berlingske Media, which has its headquarters in the street.

== History ==
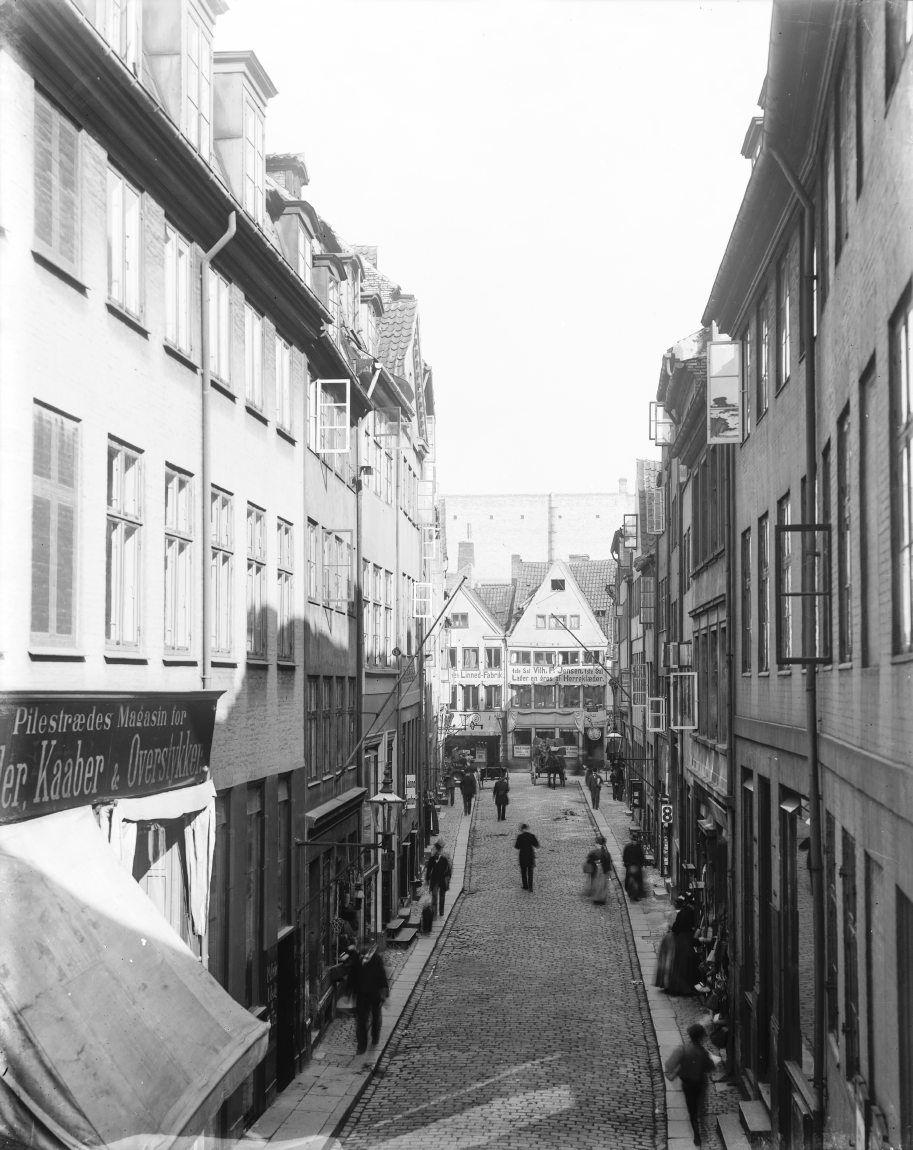
Pilestræde photographed by Frederik Riise

The street name refers to Pilegården, a farm which was located at the site in the Middle Ages. Pilegårde is first mentioned in 1419 and was divided into several smaller properties in 1579.

In the 16th century, Copenhagen's stud farm (Københavns Avlsgård), where the city's bulls were stabled, was also located along the street. The stud farm was in 1671 sold to Trinitatis Church for use as a cemetery. The northernmost part of Pilestræde was originally called Springergade with a reference to the bulls at the farm. Local residents found the name inappropriate and the street was therefore included in Pilestræde in 1881.

In 1765, Berlingske's publishinghouse established in one of the yards on the east side of the street.

== Notable buildings and residents ==
No. 32-34 was built for Berlingske Publishing House in 1930 to a design by Helweg-Møller. The building to the right of it is from 1741 and is part of the Berlingske complex. No. 26 was built in 1764 for mayor Peter Harloff Wieck.

No. 33 is from some time before 1745 and is listed. No. 37, 39, 44-45 are also listed.

The rectory of Trinity Church (No. 67) is from 1928 and was designed by Henning Hansen in collaboration with Thomas Havning.

Norse Projects have a flagship store at No. 41. The designer Julie Fagerholt has a flagship store at No. 45.

== Cultural references ==
Pilestræde is used as a location at 0:08:04 in the 1977 Olsen Gang film The Olsen Gang Outta Sight.
