= Holger (given name) =

- Pronunciation: Danish: [ˈhʌlˀkɐ] German: [ˈhɔlɡɐ]
- Gender: Male

Origin
- Region of origin: Scandinavian

Other names
- Related names: Hólmgeir, Holgar

Holger is a Scandinavian masculine given name derived from the Old Norse name Hólmgeirr, a compound of hólmr 'island', and geirr 'spear'. It is most common amongst Danish people. It is uncommon as a surname, but is found as Holkeri in Finnish. People with the name include:

- Holger Aden (born 1965), German footballer
- Holger Albrechtsen (1906–1992), Norwegian hurdler
- Holger Apfel (born 1970), German politician
- Holger Askehave (1900–1978), Danish wrestler and Olympian
- Holger Badstuber (born 1989), German association football player
- Holger Bauroth (born 1965), German cross-country skier
- Holger Becker (born 1964), German politician
- Holger Behrendt (born 1964), German gymnast and Olympic champion
- Holger Blom (1905–1965), Danish fashion designer
- Holger Blume (born 1973), German sprinter
- Holger Börner (1931–2006), German politician
- Holger Braunschweig (born 1961), German chemist
- Holger Valdemar Brøndsted (1893–1977), Danish zoologist and author
- Holger Brück (1947–2026), German footballer
- Holger Cahill (1887–1960), Icelandic-American curator, writer and arts administrator
- Holger Chen (born 1979), Taiwanese internet personality and mixed martial artist
- Holger Crafoord (1908–1982), Swedish businessman
- Holger Czukay (1938–2017), German musician
- Holger Damgaard (1870–1945), Danish photographer
- Holger B. Deising (born 1956), German agricultural scientist
- Holger Drachmann (1846–1908), Danish author and painter
- Holger Engberg (1909–1993), Swedish ice hockey player
- Holger Erbén (1915–1975), Swedish sports shooter
- Holger Ernst (born 1972), German film director
- Holger Fach (born 1962), German footballer and manager
- Holger Bertrand Flöttmann (born 1946), German neurologist and psychiatrist
- Holger Forchhammer (1848–1927), Danish football executive
- Holger Freitag (born 1963), East German ski jumper
- Holger Gaißmayer (born 1970), German footballer
- Holger Geffers (born 1971), German Paralympic athlete
- Holger Gehrke (born 1960), German football player and manager
- Holger Geschwindner (born 1945), German basketball player
- Holger Gilbert-Jespersen (1890–1975), Danish musician
- Holger Glandorf (born 1983), German handball player
- Holger Glinicki (born 1952), German wheelchair basketball coach
- Holger Görg (born 1970), German economist
- Holger Granström (1917-1941), Finnish ice hockey player
- Holger Greilich (born 1971), German footballer
- Holger Grießhammer (born 1982), German politician
- Holger Guldager (1904–1986), Danish cyclist
- Holger Gustafsson (born 1946), Swedish politician
- Holger Gzella
- Holger Häffner (born 1901), German canoeist
- Holger Hammerich (1845–1915), Danish engineer and politician
- Holger Handtke (born 1968), German television actor
- Holger Hansen (1929–2015), Danish politician and academic
- Holger Juul Hansen (1924–2013), Danish actor
- Holger Hansson (1927–2014), Swedish footballer
- Holger Haxthausen (1892–1959), Danish professor of dermatology
- Holger Henke (born 1960), German political scientist
- Holger Henning (1905–1981), Swedish Navy officer
- Holger Hentschel (born 1985), German politician
- Holger Herwig (born 1941), German-born Canadian historian
- Holger Hesse (1900–1967), German engineer
- Holger Hiemann (born 1968), German footballer
- Holger Hieronymus (born 1959), German footballer
- Holger Hiller (born 1956), German musician
- Holger Hocke (born 1945), German rower
- Holger Höglund (1906–1965), Swedish actor
- Holger Höhne (born 1970), German curler
- Holger Hoiriis (1901–1942), American Danish-born pilot
- Holger-Madsen (1878–1943), Danish film director, actor and screenwriter
- Holger H. Hoos (born 1969), German-Canadian computer scientist
- Holger Hott (born 1974), Norwegian orienteer
- Holger Jacobsen (1876–1960), Danish architect
- Holger J. Jensen (1900–1966), Danish painter
- Holger H. Jerichau (1861–1900), Danish painter
- Holger Johansson (1911–1992), Swedish footballer
- Holger Kammerhoff (born 1945), German Army general
- Holger Karlsson (1935–2015), Swedish ski jumper
- Holger Kersten (born 1951), German writer
- Holger Kimmig (born 1975), German Paralympic swimmer
- Holger Kirschke (1947–2019), German swimmer
- Holger Kleinbub (born 1971), German volleyball player
- Holger Klose (born 1972), German hammer thrower
- Holger Koefoed (born 1945), Norwegian art historian
- Holger Krahmer (born 1970), German politician and former Member of the European Parliament
- Holger Larsen (1925–2014), Danish rower
- Holger Lindberg (1894–1966), Swedish wrestler
- Holger Lissner (born 1938), Danish hymnwriter
- Holger Lode (born 1967), German specialist for pediatrics
- Holger Löhr (born 1970), German handball player
- Holger Löwenadler (1904–1977), Swedish actor
- Holger Lundgren (1912–1966), Swedish Nordic combined skier
- Holger Maletz (born 1967), German figure skater
- Holger Mann (born 1979), German politician
- Holger Martin (1942–2016), German University lecturer for process engineering
- Hólger Matamoros (born 1985), Ecuatorian footballer
- Holger Meins (1941–1974), German revolutionary, RAF member
- Holger Meitinger (born 1957), German ice hockey player
- Holger Michael (born 1954), German diplomat
- Holger Militz (born 1960), German professor and wood scientist
- Holger Mitterer (born 1973), German cognitive scientist
- Holger Mühlbauer (born 1964), German jurist and writer
- Holger Münch (born 1961), German police officer
- Holger Nielsen (1866–1954), Danish sportsman
- Holger Bech Nielsen (born 1941), Danish physicist
- Holger K. Nielsen (born 1950), Danish politician
- Holger Marius Nielsen (1905–1993), Official of the Danish Ministry of Education
- Holger Nikelis (born 1978), German para table tennis player
- Holger Norman-Hansen (1899–1984), Danish chess player
- Holger Nurmela (1920–2005), Swedish ice hockey player
- Holger Obermann (1936–2021), German footballer and journalist
- Holger Osieck (born 1948), German football manager
- Holger Simon Paulli (1810–1891), Danish conductor and composer
- Oliger Paulli (1644–1714), Danish merchant, pamphleteer, religious fanatic and publisher
- Holger Pedersen (astronomer) (born 1946), Danish astronomer
- Holger Pedersen (linguist) (1867–1953), Danish linguist
- Holger Petersen (Canadian businessman) (born 1949), Canadian record producer
- Holger Petersen (Danish businessman) (1843-1917), Danish merchant
- Holger Pettersson (1942–2010), Swedish radiologist and educator
- Holger Pohland (born 1963), German hurdler
- Holger Pukk (1920–1997), Estonian children's writer
- Hólger Quiñónez (born 1962), Ecuadorian footballer
- Holger Quintero (born 2007), Ecuadorian footballer
- Holger Rasmusen (1894–1983), American politician and pharmacist
- Holger Christian Reedtz (1800–1857), Danish nobleman and Minister of Foreign Affairs
- Holger Reenberg (1872–1942), Danish actor
- Holger Roed (1846–1874), Danish painter
- Holger Romander (1921–2020), Swedish civil servant
- Holger Rootzén (born 1945), Swedish mathematical statistician
- Holger Rosenkrantz (1574–1642), Danish nobleman
- Holger Rune (born 2003), Danish tennis player
- Holger Salin (1911–1943), Finnish footballer
- Holger Peter Sandhofe (1972–2005), German typesetter and scholar
- Holger Scheuermann (1877–1960), Danish surgeon
- Holger Schmieding (born 1958), German economist
- Holger Schneider (born 1963), German handball player
- Holger Schön (1910–1980), Swedish ski jumper
- Holger Jens Schünemann (born 1967), German-canadian physician scientist and epidemiologist
- Holger Seebach (1922–2011), Danish footballer
- Holger Seitz (born 1974), German football player and manager
- Holger Sinding-Larsen (1869–1938), Norwegian architect
- Holger Stahlknecht (born 1964), German politician
- Holger Stanislawski (born 1969), German football manager
- Holger Stark (born 1962), German pharmacist
- Holger Stjern (1888–1968), Norwegian politician
- Holger Stromberg (born 1972), German chef
- Holger F. Struer (1846–1931), Danish chemist
- Holger Sumelius (1901–1976), Finnish sailor
- Holger Sundström (1925–2023), Swedish sailor
- Holger Thiele (1878–1946), Danish American astronomer
- Holger Toftoy (1902–1967), United States Army general
- Holger Topp-Pedersen (1868–1938), Danish landscape painter
- Holger Tou (1919–1947), Norwegian police officer
- Holger Trimhold (born 1953), German footballer
- Holger Ursin (1934–2016), Norwegian physician and psychologist
- Holger Voss, German Internet user
- Holger Waldenberger (born 1967), German professional quiz player
- Holger Walter (born 1968), German sculptor
- Holger Wehlage (born 1976), German footballer
- Holger Wick (born 1962), German biathlete
- Holger Willmer (born 1958), German former footballer
- Holger Winselmann (born 1963), German handball player
- Holger Zander (born 1943), German canoeist
- Holger Zastrow (born 1969), German politician
- Holger Zellentin (born 1976), German scholar of religious studies
- Holger Ziegeler (born 1961), German physicist and diplomat
- Holger Ziegler (born 1974), German criminologist

== See also ==
- Holger (disambiguation)
