= Hammerich =

Hammerich is a surname. Notable people with the surname include:

- Borghild Hammerich (1901–1978) Norwegian activist
- Bodil Hammerich (1877–1941), Danish American actress
- Carl Hammerich (1888–1945) Danish naval officer and admiral
- Else Hammerich (born 1936) Danish politician
- Golla Hammerich (1854–1903), Danish pianist
- Holger Hammerich (1845–1915), Danish engineer and politician
- Martin Hammerich (1811–1881) Danish art historian, educator, author and translator
- Paul Hammerich (1927–1992) Danish journalist and writer
- Rumle Hammerich (born 1954) Danish film director, screenwriter and film company director
- Asger Hammerich (born 1843) Danish composer, spelled Hamerik in USA, from 1871 in Baltimore
