= Holger =

Holger may refer to:

== People ==
- Holger (given name), includes name origin, plus people with the name
- Hilde Holger (1905–2001), Austrian-British dancer and choreographer
- Immanuel Holger (1893–1963), Chilean politician
- Rolf Holger (1903–1969), Norwegian organist, pianist, and composer

== Fictional characters ==
- Holger Danske, a legendary Danish hero

== Other uses ==
- Holger Danske (Resistance group)
- Holger Danske (opera)
- 9266 Holger, a main-belt asteroid
- Radio Holger
