= Olger =

Olger is a given name. Notable people with the name include:

- Olger B. Burtness (1884–1960), American politician and judge
- Olger Merkaj (born 1997), Albanian footballer
- Olger van Dijk (born 1979), Dutch politician

== See also ==
- Folger
- Holger (given name)
- Olga
