= Schmieding =

Schmieding is a surname. Notable people with the surname include:

- Holger Schmieding (born 1958), German economist
- Reinhold Schmieding (born 1955/56), American businessman
