= Pilestræde 42 =

Building in Copenhagen, Denmark

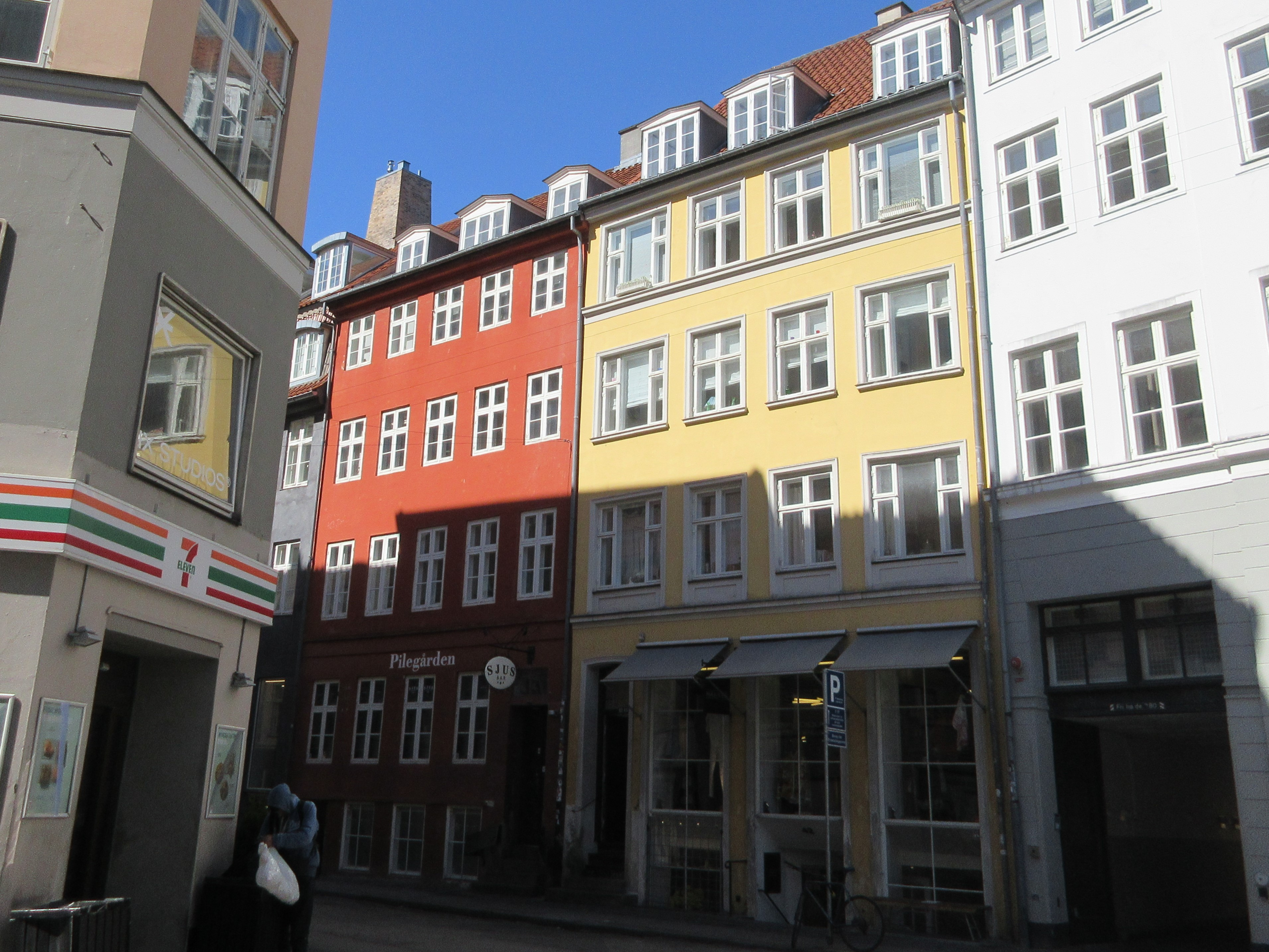
- Interactive map of the Pilestræde 42 area

General information
- Location: Copenhagen, Denmark
- Coordinates: 55°40′51.82″N 12°34′47.82″E
- Completed: 17th century

Pilestræde 42 is an 18th-century building situated in Pilestræde in the Old Town of Copenhagen, Denmark. Originally a two-storey building from the 1730s, constructed on the foundations of Christian IV's Canon Foundry, it was later in the century heightened with two storeys. Pilestræde 42 and Pilestræde 44 were merged into a single property in the early 1970s. The two buildings were listed in the Danish registry of protected buildings and places in 1985.

== History ==
=== Site history, 1510–1728 ===
Christian IV constructed a canon foundry on the site in 1610. It was later moved to a new building on Kongens Nytorv. On 31 May 1671, the property in Pilestræde was sold to stamped paper-manager Albert Heintz for 2,000 rigsdaler. His widow Magdalene Klingenberg kept the property after his death. Her property was listed in Copenhagen's first cadastre of 1689 as No. 95 in Købmager Quarter. The next owner was wine merchant Henrik Würner. In 1691, he sold the property to wine merchant Jochum Würger. The large property, upon the death of his widow, was divided into five smaller properties. The buildings on the site were all destroyed in the Copenhagen Fire of 1728. The building was later heightened with two storeys around 1780.

=== 18th century ===
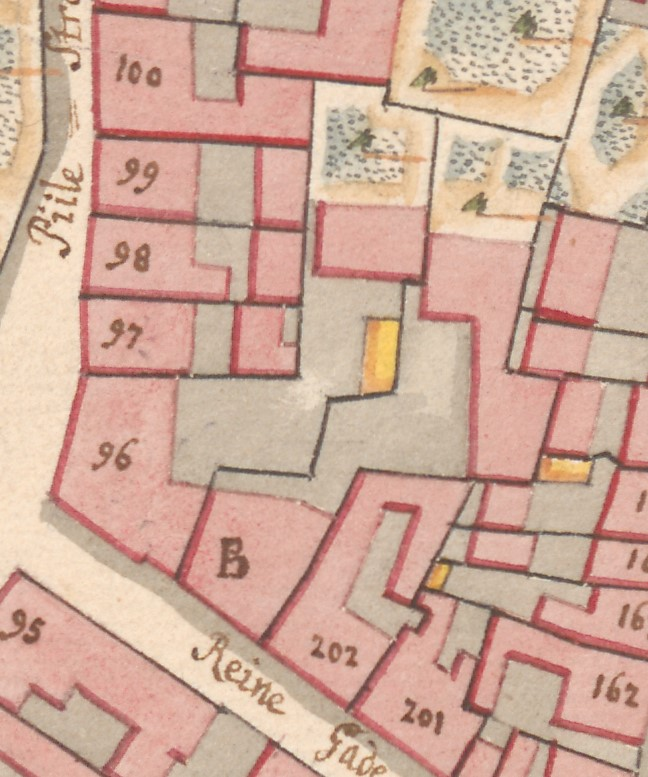
No. 98 seen on a detail from Christian Gedde's map of Jøbmager Quarter, 1757.

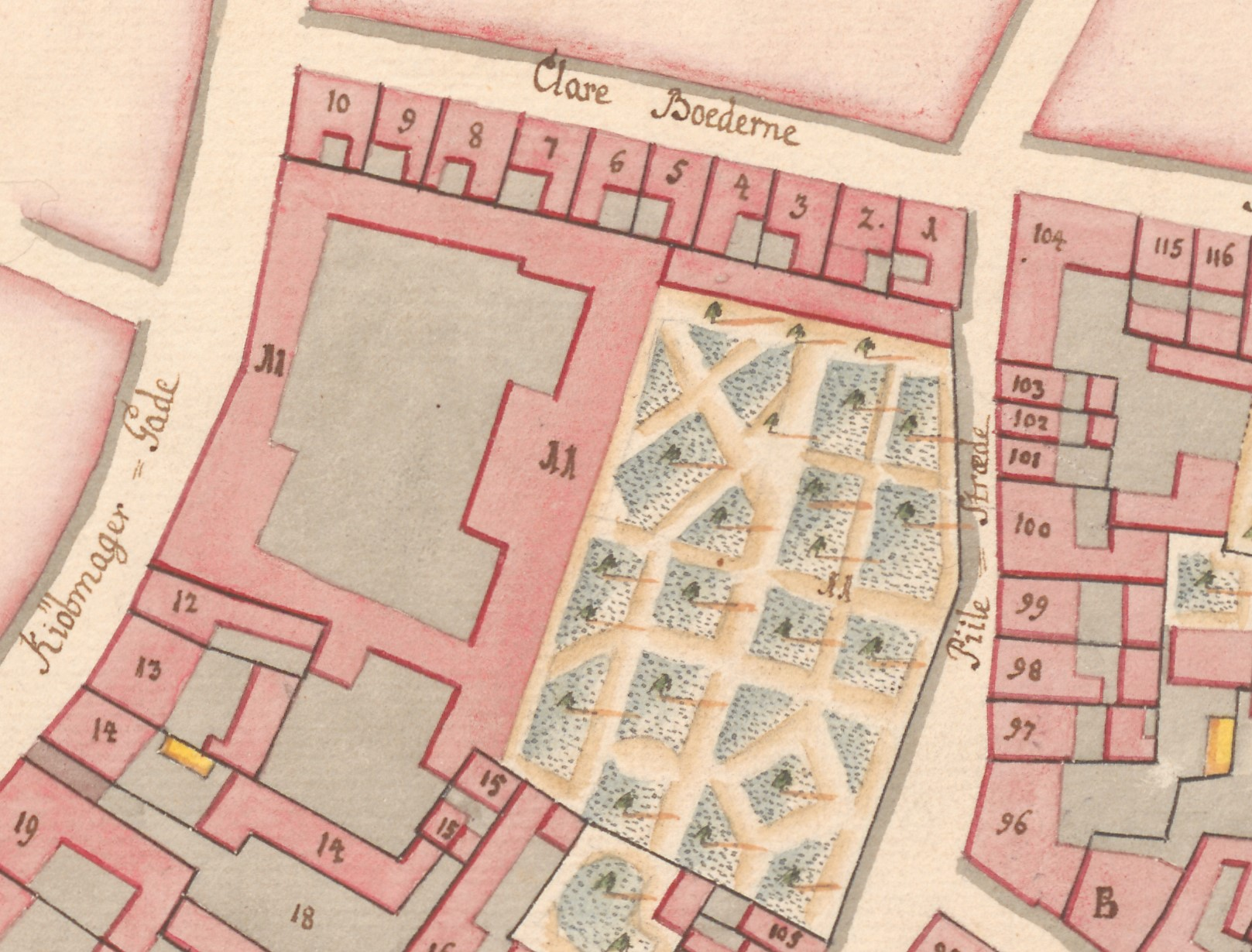
No. 97 seen on a detail from Christian Gedde's map of Købmager Quarter, 1757.

The building now known as Pilestræde 42 was constructed with two storeys some time between 1730 and 1735 for tailor Lorentz Dahl. The property was listed in the new cadastre of 1756 as No. 97 in Købmager Quarter. It belonged to stocking-weaver Jørgen Adolph Iborg at that time.

No. 97 was home to 30 residents in seven households at the 1787 census. Martinus Rydendal, a passementerie-maker, resided in the building with his wife Anne Sørensdatter and their four children (aged eight to 20). Jean Berla, a French teacher, resided in the building with his wife Catharina Elisabeth Lund and one maid. Niels Korn, a bookkeeper at Skillingekassen, resided in the building with his housekeeper Anne Lykke and one lodger. Conradt Arenhold, a soldier, resided in the building with his wife Anne Barbara Maurer, their two-year-old son Johannes Bartholomæus Arenhold and his father-in-law Johan Philip Maurer. Else Marie Sandberg, a midwife, resided in the building with her daughter Garlau Sandberg and grandson Peter Olsen. Alexander Isak, a merchant, resided in the building with his wife Eva NN, his daughter Ellen Alexander and son-in-law Aron Jacob, their two-year-old son Zizel Aron and one maid. Peer Christensen, a grocer (spækhøker), resided in the basement with his wife Birthe Olsdatter, their two children (aged five and seven) and one maid.

=== 19th century ===
After his wife's death, Martinus Rydendal married the midwife's daughter Gorlov Sandberg. Their property was home to 41 residents in eight households at the 1801 census. Martinus and Gorlov Rydendahl resided in the building with their five children aged 9 to 28, the three eldest from his first marriage) and one maid. Simon Philip, a merchant, resided in the building with his wife Birgitte Israel, his mother Juditte Philips, one maid and one lodger. Andreas Petersen, a shoemaker, resided in the building with his wife Ane Wederkindt, their three children (aged one to 11) and one lodger (shoemaker). Friderich Rosløv, a clockmaker, resided in the building with his wife Ane Cathrine Ahle, their three-year-old son Andreas Friderich [Rosløv] and one lodger. Mathias Lund, a master klein smith, resided in the building with his Bodil Cathrine [Lund]. Ane Christens, a widow beer seller (øltapper), resided in the basement with one maid and four lodgers (waiters). Niels Olsen, a coachman, resided in the building with his wife Marie Cathrine [Olsen], their three children (one to six) and three lodgers.

The property was listed in the new cadastre of 1806 as No. 122 in Købmager Quarter. It belonged to restaurateur Christian Muusfeldt at that time.

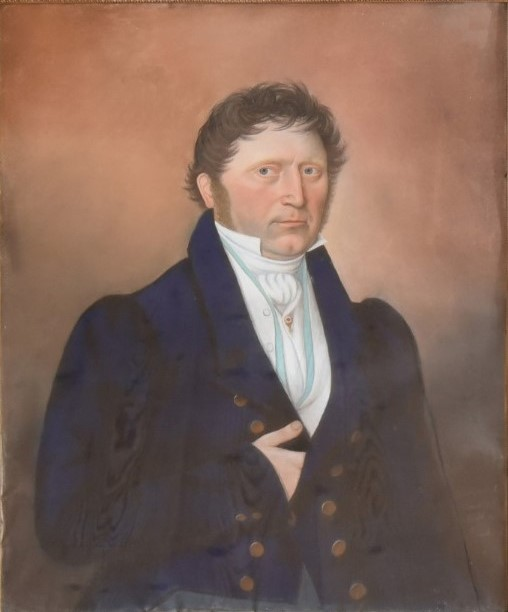
Peter Nielsen Tømmerbye (1773–1840)

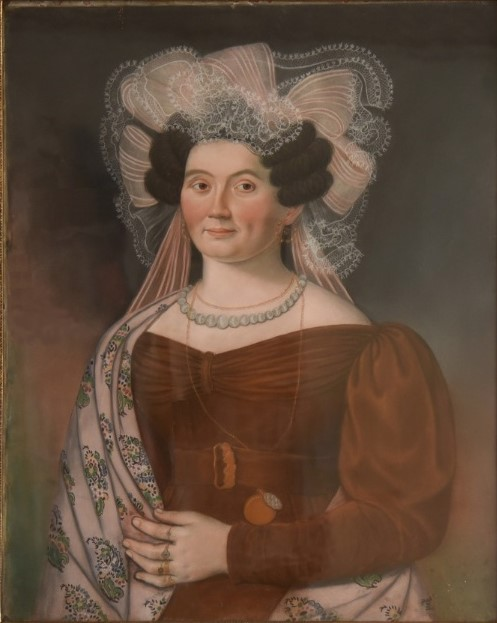
Anna Kierstin Tømmerbye, née Evaldt (1785–1858)

In 1820, No. 123 was acquired by Peter Tømmerbye (1774–1840). He continued the restaurant on the ground floor. Tømmerbye was married to Anna Maria Christiana Langemack (1785–1858). The couple had married in 1799 but their marriage resulted in no children. Tømmerbye did however have a daughter. Inger Helene Tømmerbye (born 28 February 1805), and a son, Niels Christian Reimert Tømmerbye (born 15 February 1808), both born out of wedlock with the much younger woman Ane Kirstine Evaldt. Anna Maria Tømmerbye died in 1821, In 1822, Peter Tømmerbye instead married the mother of his two children. On 15 February 1834, their daughter Inger Helene Tømmerbye married senior clerk (fuldmægtig) at the Royal Mint Peter Reimer Hinnerup, son of distiller Anders Hinnerup and Birgitte Reimer.

Anna Kierstin Tømmerbye continued the restaurant upon her husband's death in 1840. Her property was home to 27 residents at the 1845 census. Ane Tømmerbye resided on the ground floor with four maids (aged 17 to 28). Frederik Jensen, a former beer seller (øltapper), resided on the first floor with two daughters (aged 17 and 26). Anton Burgmeister, a glazier (glassliber), resided on the first floor with one maid. Jens Nielsen, a long-distance coachman (rejsekysk), resided on the second floor with his wife Ane Nielsen, two daughters (aged nine and 24) and one lodger. Juliane Abrahams, a widow with means, resided on the second floor with her 45-year-old daughter Hanne Abrahams and one maid. Eline Heining, a widow with a pension, resided on the third floor with 73-year-old Petronelle Rasmussen (unmarried, needlework) and one maid. Christopher Zalchow, an 81-year-old widower, resided in the garret. Poul Høidahl, a master basketmaker, resided in the basement with his wife Cathrine Pedersen and their three children (aged nine to 15).

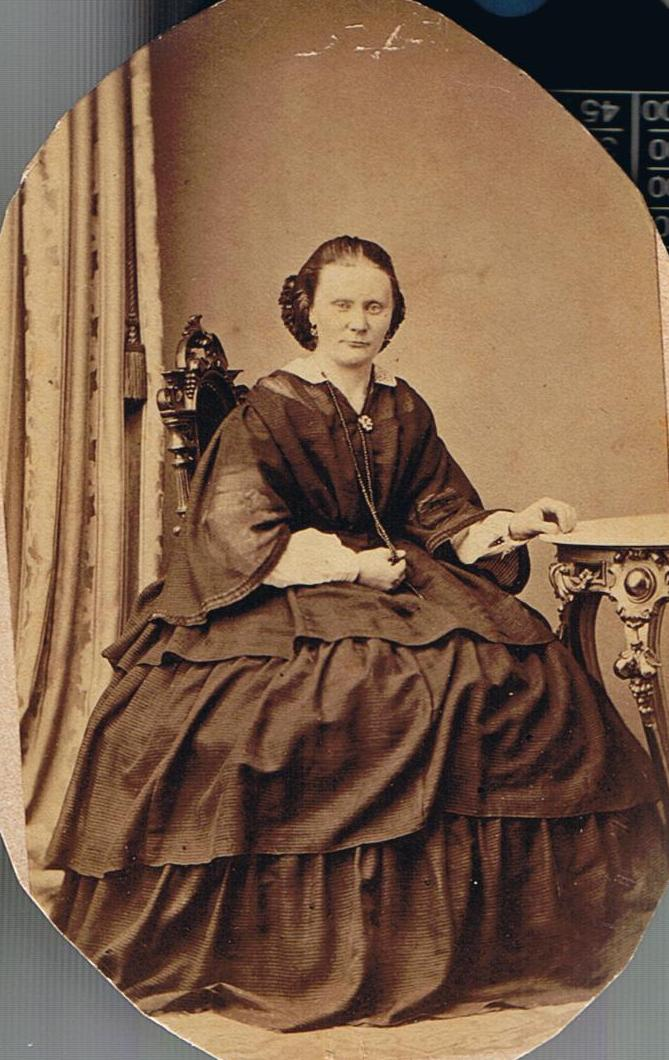
Ane Petrine Frederikke Storm (née Hinnerup),

The restaurant closed around 1850. Anna Kierstin Tømmerbye died in 1858. Upon her death, the property was passed to her 24-year-old Ane Petrine Frederikke Hinnerup (1834–1867). She was still living with her parents in Hummergade. Her mother died on 3 August 1861. The family moved to a new apartment at Nyhavn 26 shortly thereafter. In Garrison Church on 10 November 1865, Frederikke Hunnerup married royal musician Frederik Christian Valdemar Storm (born 1829), son of master shoemaker Peter Storm and wife Bertha Kirstine Rasmussen. The newly wedded couple settled down at Nyhavn 26.

Frederikke Storm (née Hinnerup) died on 25 June 1867, just five days after giving birth to their first child. Ownership of Pilestræde 42 was subsequently transferred to the newborn son, Frederik Storm, whose father stepped in as guardian.

Frederik Storm's property at Pilestræde 42 was home to 38 residents in nine households at the 1860 census. Julius Wilhelm Moyel (1825–1898, son of the architect Jacob Wilhelm Moyel), a 34-year-old aeronaut and photographer, resided on the ground floor with his wife Caroline Marie Moyel. Carl Frederik Guldberg, a businessman (kommissionær), resided in the building with his wife Lovise Magrethe Guldberg and their 18-year-old son Carl Anton Guldberg. Betty Hirsch, a widow pest controller (kammerjægerinde), resided in the building with her daughter Eva Krebs, her son-in-law Carl Frederik Krebs (junk dealer) and six-year-old son and a 19-year-old foster son. Eline Cathincka Heinig, a retired pest controller, resided in the building with one maid. Johane Christiane Hofmeister, an unmarried 38-year-old woman employed with needlework, resided in the building on her own. Sophie Hanne Behrendsen, a widow also employed with needlework, resided in the building with her five-year-old son. Carl Christian Guntel, a master cooper, resided in the building with his wife Birgitte Kirstine Guntel. their six children (aged two to 16), one cooper's apprentice and one maid. Peter Johansen, a workman, resided in the building with his wife Anna Johansen, their four children (aged two to nine) and 24-year Eline Grutzmann (needleworker). Jørgen Fred Wulf, a coachman, resided in the building with his wife Ane Wulf, their four children (aged six to 19) and 28-year-old Gustava Charlotte Wallengren (needleworker).

On 17 January 1897, Frederik Storm sold the property for DKK 38,000.

=== 20th century ===
Pilestræde 42 and Pilestræde 55 were merged into a single property in 1971. The two buildings were listed in the Danish registry of protected buildings and places in 1989.

== Architecture ==
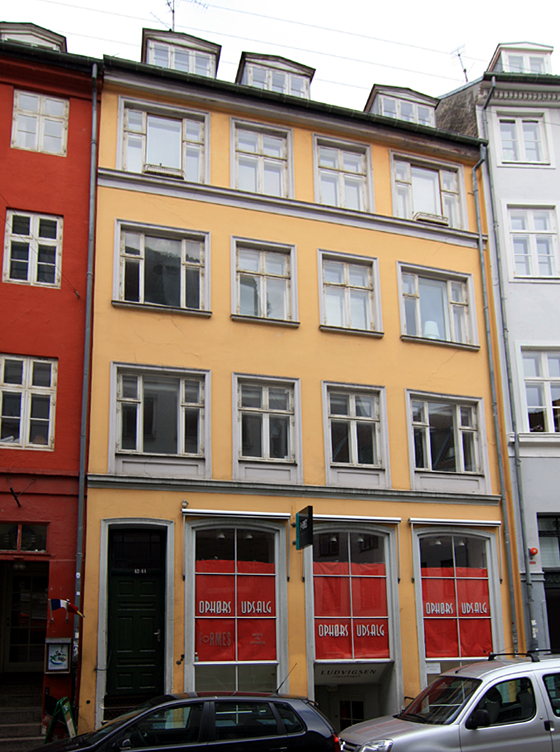
Pilestræde 42.

Pilestræde 42 is constructed with four storeys over a walk-out basement. The four-bay-wide facade is plastered and painted yellow, with white-painted windows. It is finished with a white-painted cornice band above the ground floor, a white-painted sill course below the third-floor windows and a white-painted cornice below the roof. The slightly arch-headed main entrance is topped by a transom window. The roof is clad in red tiles. It features three dormer windows towards the street. The rear side of the building faces an unusually large courtyard shared with a number of other buildings in Pilestræde and Sværtegade.

== Today ==
Pilestræde 42–44 is owned today by A/B Pilestræde 42–44. It contains a shop on the ground floor and in the basement and residential apartments on the upper floors.
