= Nybrogade 10 =

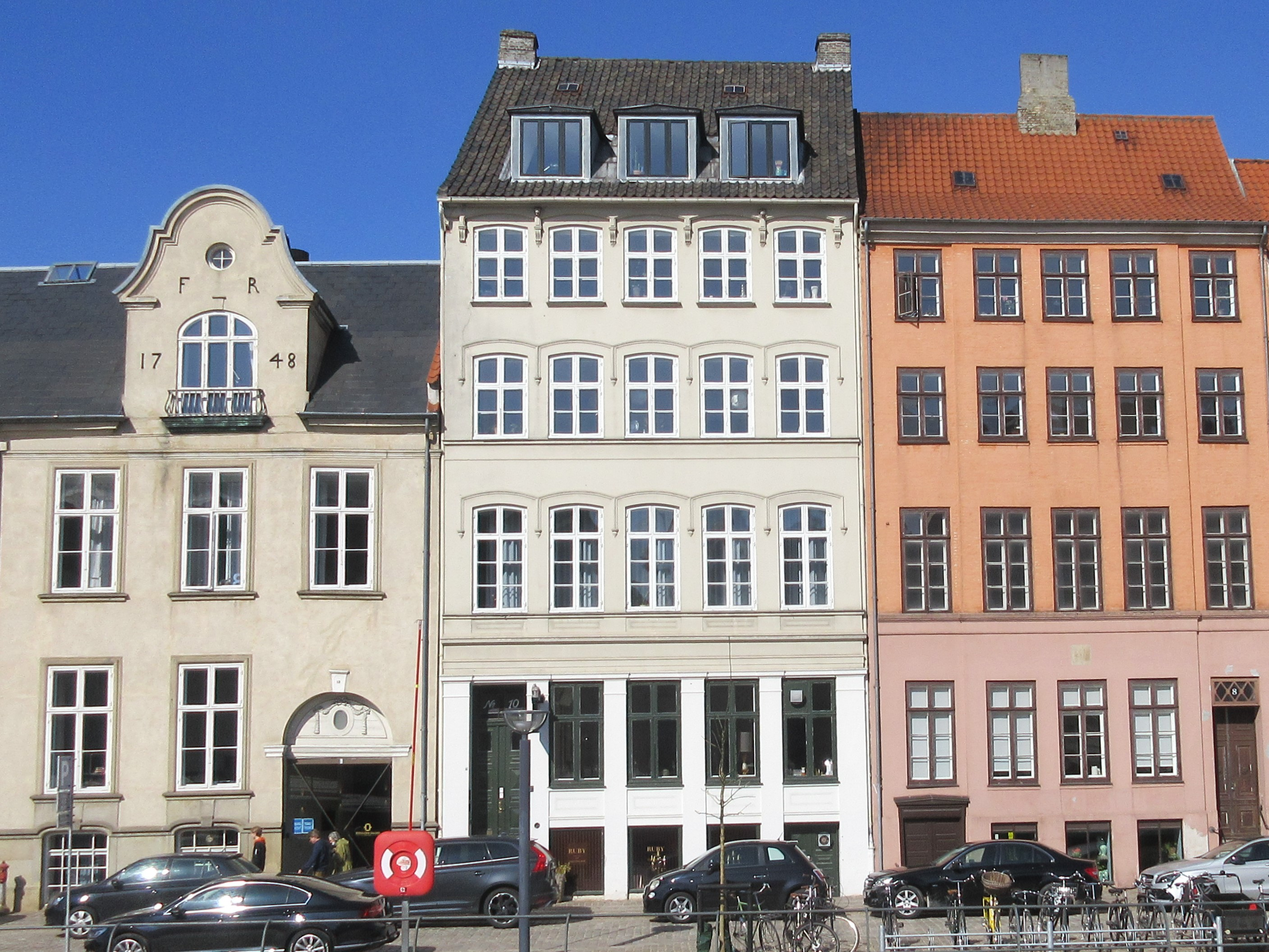
- Interactive map of the Nybrogade 10 area

General information
- Architectural style: Neoclassical
- Location: Copenhagen, Denmark
- Coordinates: 55°40′40.66″N 12°34′35.94″E
- Completed: C. 1740
- Inaugurated: 1854 (heightened)

Nybrogade 10 is a Late Neoclassical property on the Gammel Strand-Nybrogade canalfront, opposite Thorvaldsens Museum and Christiansborg Palace, in central Copenhagen, Denmark. The narrow property comprises the building at Snaregade 7 on the other side of the block as well as a perpendicular side wing that connects the two buildings along the northeast side of a small courtyard. The building on Nybrogade was constructed as a Baroque style townhouse but owes its current appearance to a major renovation in the 1850s. The complex was listed in the Danish registry of protected buildings and places in 1945. The church historian Frederik Hammerich and the philologist and educator Martin Hammerich grew up in the building. Former city engineer and publisher of the city directory Kraks Vejviser Thorvald Krak (1830-1908) resided in the apartment on the third floor from 1899 until his death.

== History ==
=== Early history ===
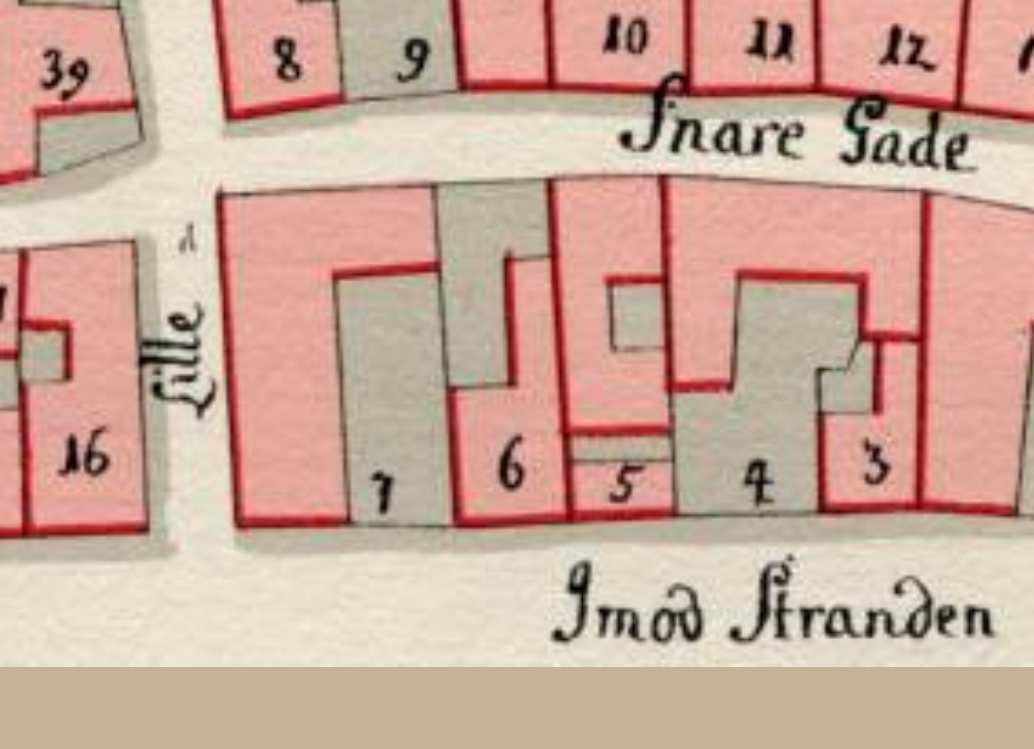
No. 6 seen on a detail from Christian Gedde's map of Snaren's Quarter, 1757.

The property was in 1689 as No. 6 in Snaren's Quarter owned by lawyer Jørgen Simonsen. The buildings were together with most of the other buildings in the area destroyed in the Copenhagen Fire of 1728. The current building in Nybrogade, then known as Imod Kanalen, literally "Towards the Canal", was constructed in 1740. In 1756, it was (still as No. 6) owned by merchant Jacob Gregorius Graae.

The property was at the time of the 1787 census home to two households. Johan Vilhelm Rathje (c. 1730 -1804), a merchant (grosserer), lived there with his wife, their son, the wife's sister, a servant and two maids. Johan Reinholdt von Grube, director of Tallotteriet, a lottery, lived there with his wife, daughter and two maids.

At the time of the 1801 census, No. 6 was still home to two households. Johan Wilhelm Rathje, now registered as a stadskaptajn (captain of the quarter's Civil Guard), was still residing there with his wife, their son, an "office boy", a caretaker and two maids. Georg Friderich Frelsen, an etatsråd was now residing in the other apartment with his wife Mette Cathrine Clemens, their two sons (aged 14 and 20) and two maids.

=== Hammerich & Olesen ===
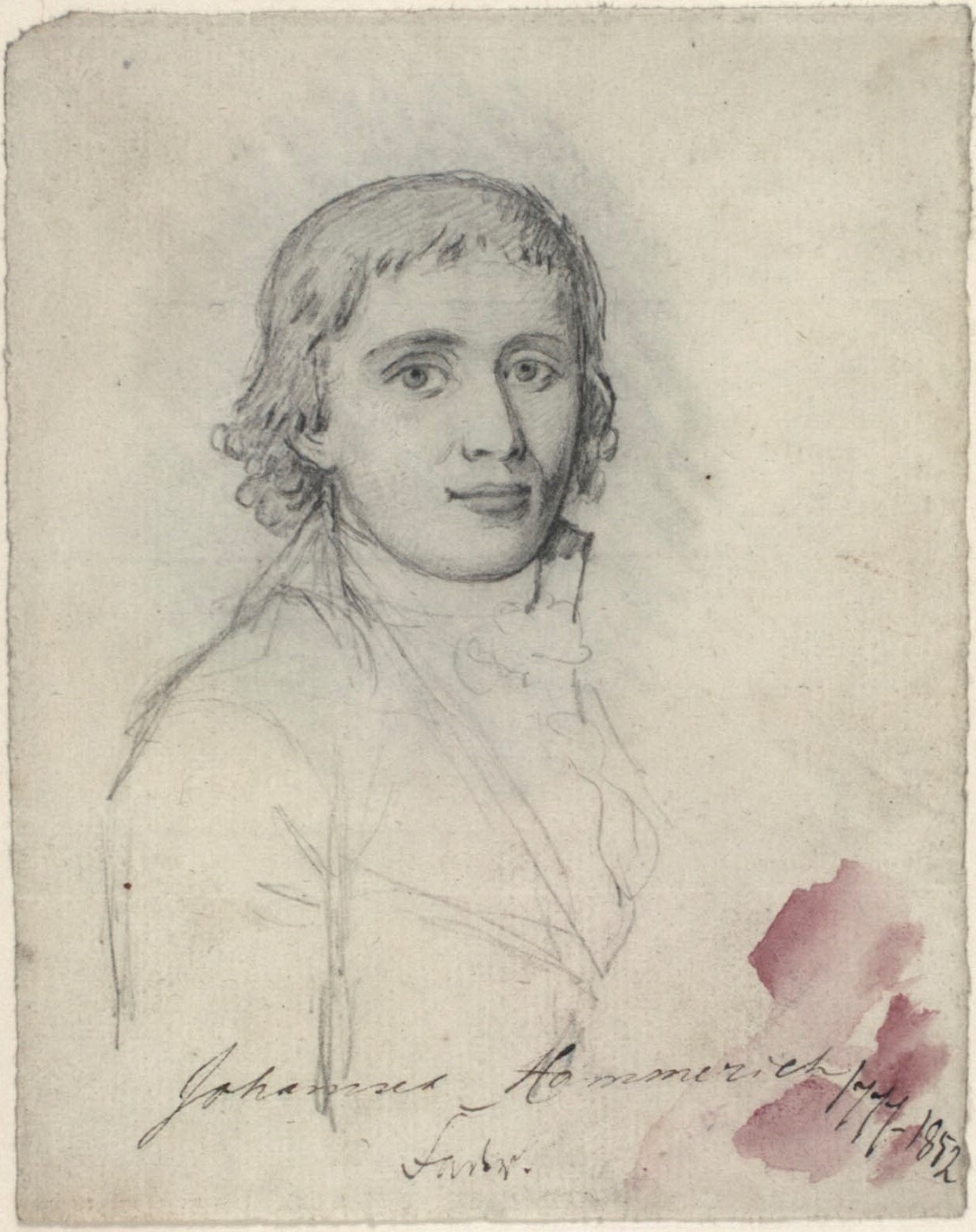
Johannes Hammerich

The property was in the new cadastre of 1806 listed as No. 5. It was by then owned by the merchants Hammerich & Olesen. Johannes Hammerich (1777-1852) was married to Metha Magdalena Adolph (1777-1823). The homeir was characterized by Herrnhut values.

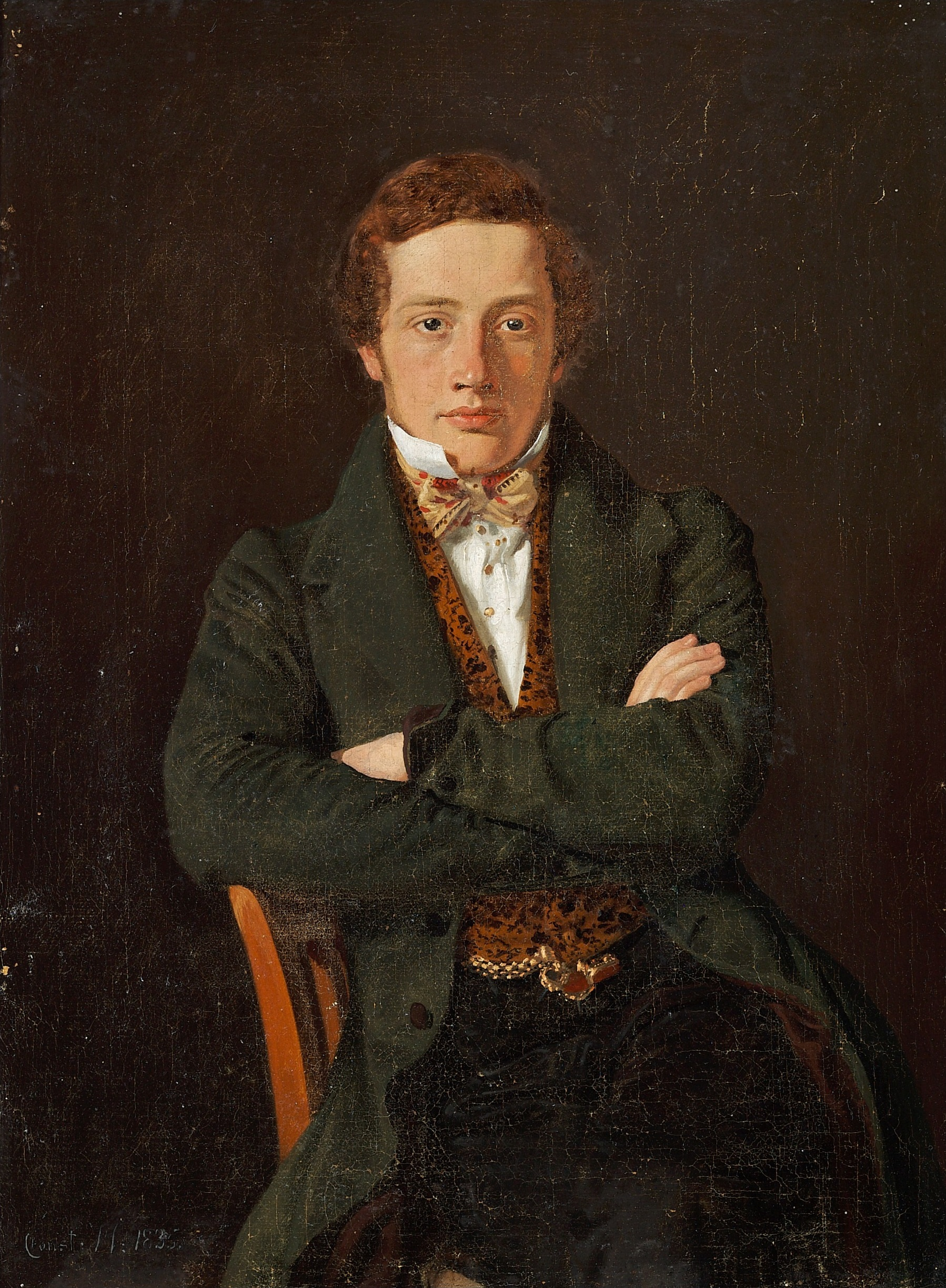
Martin Hammerich painted by Constantin Hansen in 1835.

Their eldest son, Frederik Hammerich (1809-1877), who studied theology, lived in his father's house until 1835 when he went on a longer journey in Scandinavia. He would later become a professor of church history at the University of Copenhagen. His younger brother, Martin Hammerich (1811-1991), became a classical scholar. He resided in the house in Nybrogade until the early 1840s, interrupted only by two longer journeys abroad in 1837 and 1838 – 1839. In 1843, he moved to an apartment in a now demolished building at Vester Voldgade 11. He had in 1841 married Ane Mathea Aagaard (1820-1894), daughter of the estate owner Holger Hammerich, from whom he eventually inherited Iselingen Manor at Vordingborg.

At the time of the 1840 census, Hammerich's property was home to a total of 21 residents. Johannes and Martin Hammerich resided in the first-floor apartment with their housekeeper and a maid. A customs officer and his wife resided with their five children on the ground floor. A joiner and his wife resided with three children from the joiner's first marriage and a lodger in the basement. The apartment on the second floor was occupied by a 69-year-old widow who lived there with her unmarried daughter, a 50-year-old unmarried woman and a maid.

The poet Christian Winther (1796-1876 was a resident in the building in 1849–50. The poet U. P. Overbye (1819-1879) was a resident in the building in 1943–54.

=== Later history ===
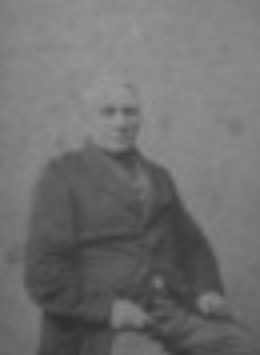
Jacob Wilhelm Moyel

In the 1850s, the building was acquired by the architect Jacob Wilhelm Moyel (1799-1865). Moyel's father, David (Ben Muel) Moyel (1753-1831), a Jewish furniture dealer who had emigrated to Denmark from Morocco, is remembered for building the Moyel House in Kongens Lyngby. Hacob Wilhelm Moyel had just completed the building at Bredgade 10. He heightened the building in Nybrogade with one storey and replaced the building on Snaregade with a new four-storey apartment building. The side wing was also refurbished.

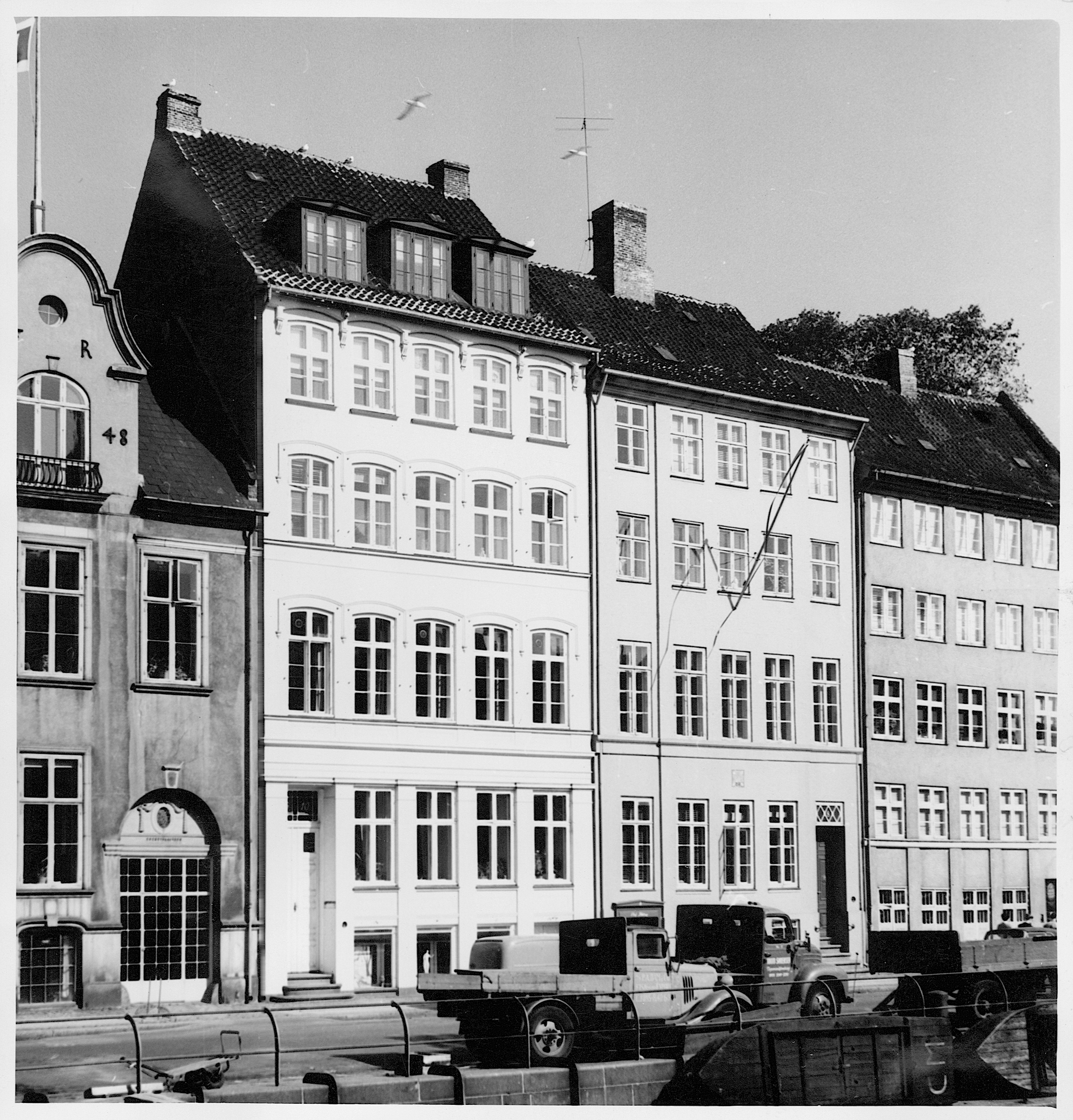
Nybrogade 10 in 1956.

Nybrogade 10 was home to a total of 27 people at the time of the 1860 census. The 35-year-old count Hans Schack Rudolph Knuth was lodger in one of the apartments.

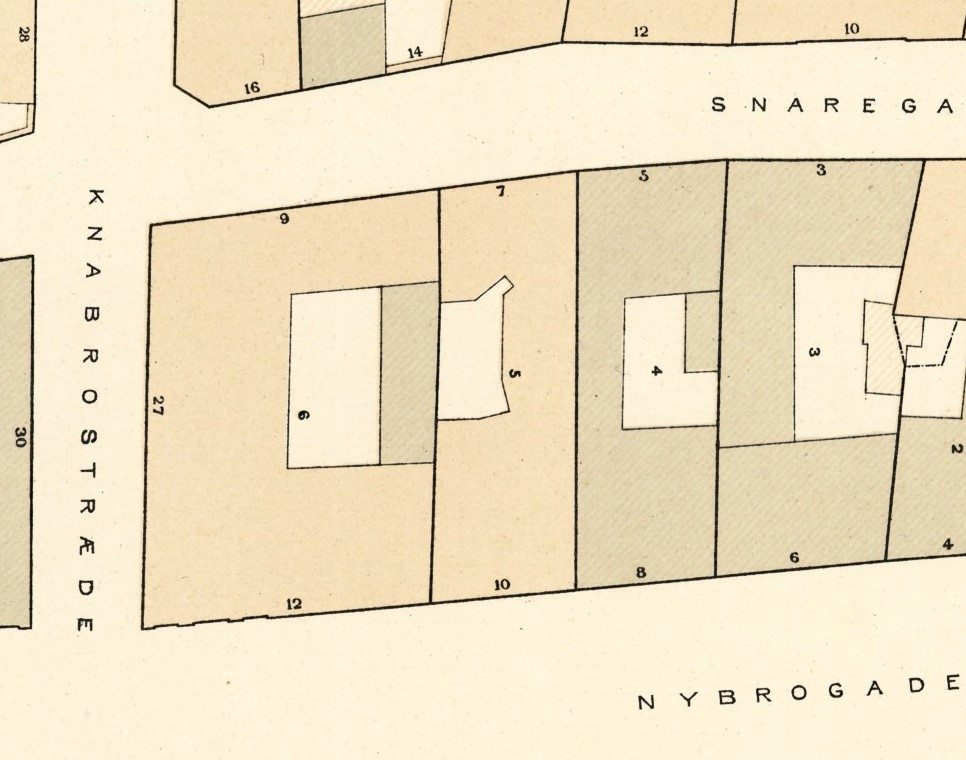
Nybrogade 10 seen on a detail from Berggreen's cadastral map of Snaren's Quarter, 1884.

The former city engineer Thorvald Krak (1830-1908) resided in the first-floorapartment from 1899 until his death. He was the publisher of Kraks Vejviser, a city directory, until in 1902 leaving it in the hands of his son, Ove Krak, a physician. Ove Krak (1862-1923) was himself a resident in the apartment on the second floor from c. 1906 to 1912. Nybrogade 10 was at the time of the 1906 census home to 13 people. The actor Otto Lagoni was lodging with a family on the fourth floor. Another 12 people were living at Snaregade 8. The Embassy of Georgia was formerly based in the building.

== Architecture ==
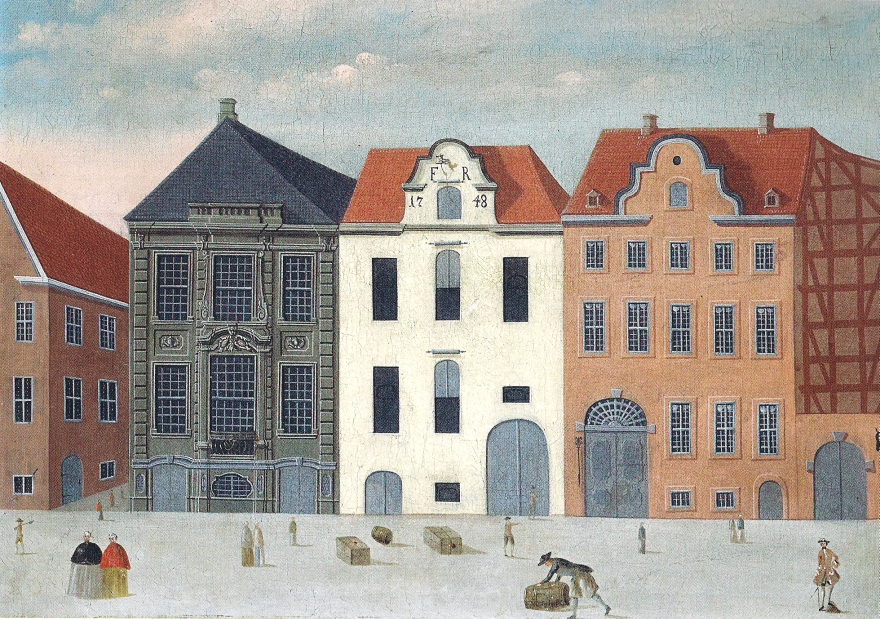
The original design of No. 10 (right), together with the two buildings that now form No. 12, on a drawing by Rach & Eeberg from 1749.

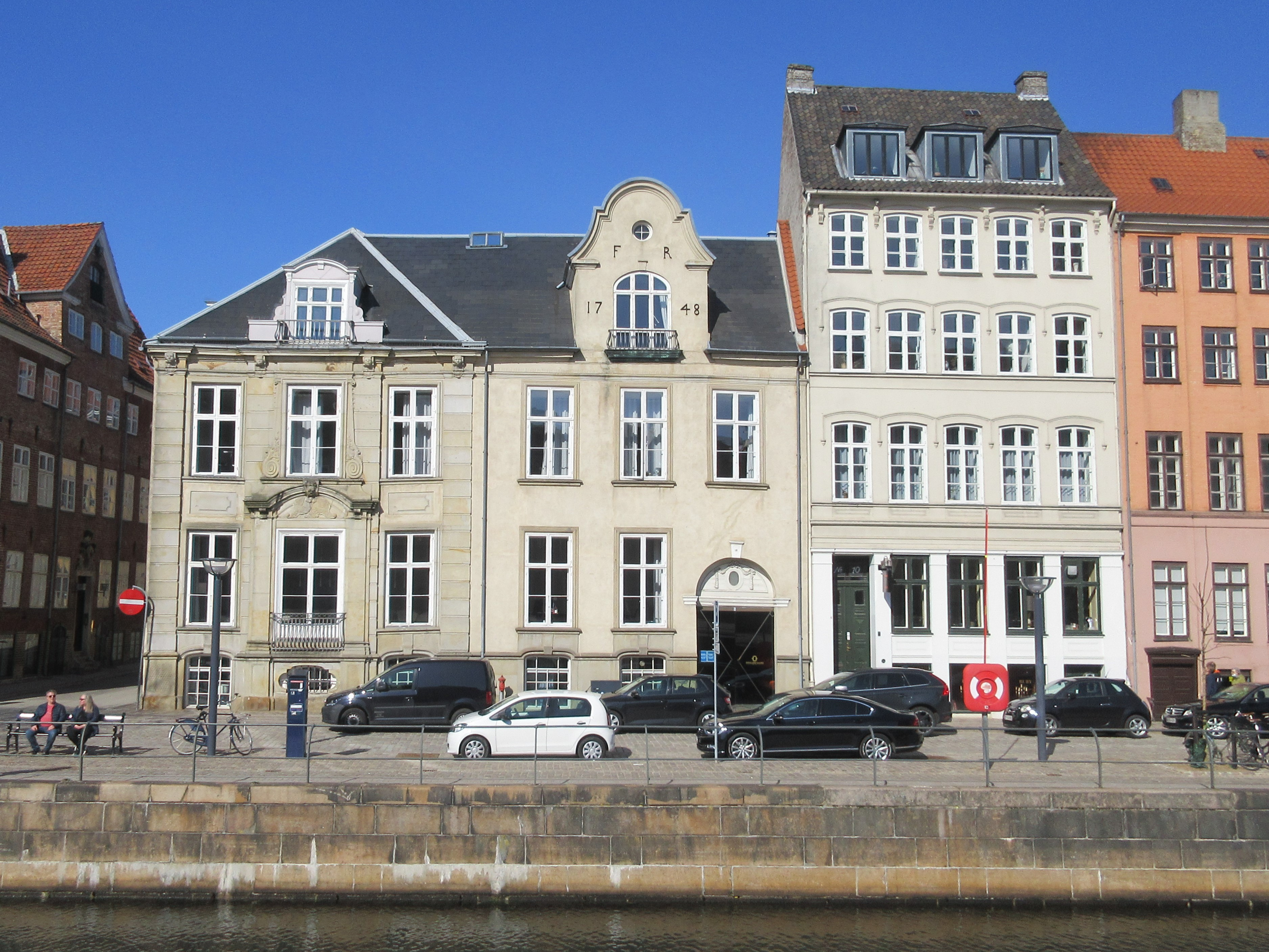
Sane site in 2021

Nybrogade 10 was at the time of its construction in c. 1740 a Baroque style townhouse, constructed with three storeys over a walk-out basement and a facade crowned by a Dutch gable dormer, reminiscent of the more intact next door Ziegler House at No. 12.

Moyel's renovation in the 1850s heightened the building with one floor and converted the original two-bay gateway into a doorway. The facade is plastered and white-painted, with pilasters with capitals on the between the windows on the ground floor, a through-going sill band below the second floor windows and decorative bands that follow slightly arched windows on the three upper floors. The decorative band above the windows on the third floor is wider and turns into a sort of cornice supported by Corbels. The pitched roof is clad in black tile and features three relative wide dormer windows. The roof ridge is pierced by two chimneys.

Snaregade 7 is constructed in brick with four storeys over a base. The facade is five bays wide, plastered and painted in a pale beige colour, with shadow joints on the ground floor, contrasted by dark-brown windows. The facade is finished by a cornice band above the ground floor, a sill in the full width of the building below the windows on the second floor and a cornice supported by relatively robust corbels. The main entrance in the bay furthest to the left is raised four steps from street level and topped by a transom window. The pitched red tile roof features three dormer windows. The roof ridge is pierced by a chimney.

The perpendicular wing is four bays long and is in both ends attached to the two front wings via an inwardly turned diagonal bay. It contains a door with access to the staircase in Snaregade as well as a separate basement entrance. The monopitched, red tile roof is pierced by a chimney. All facades facing the yard are plastered and white-painted.

== Today ==
The building is today owned by A/S Reinholt W Jorck. It is let out as office space.

== Gallery ==
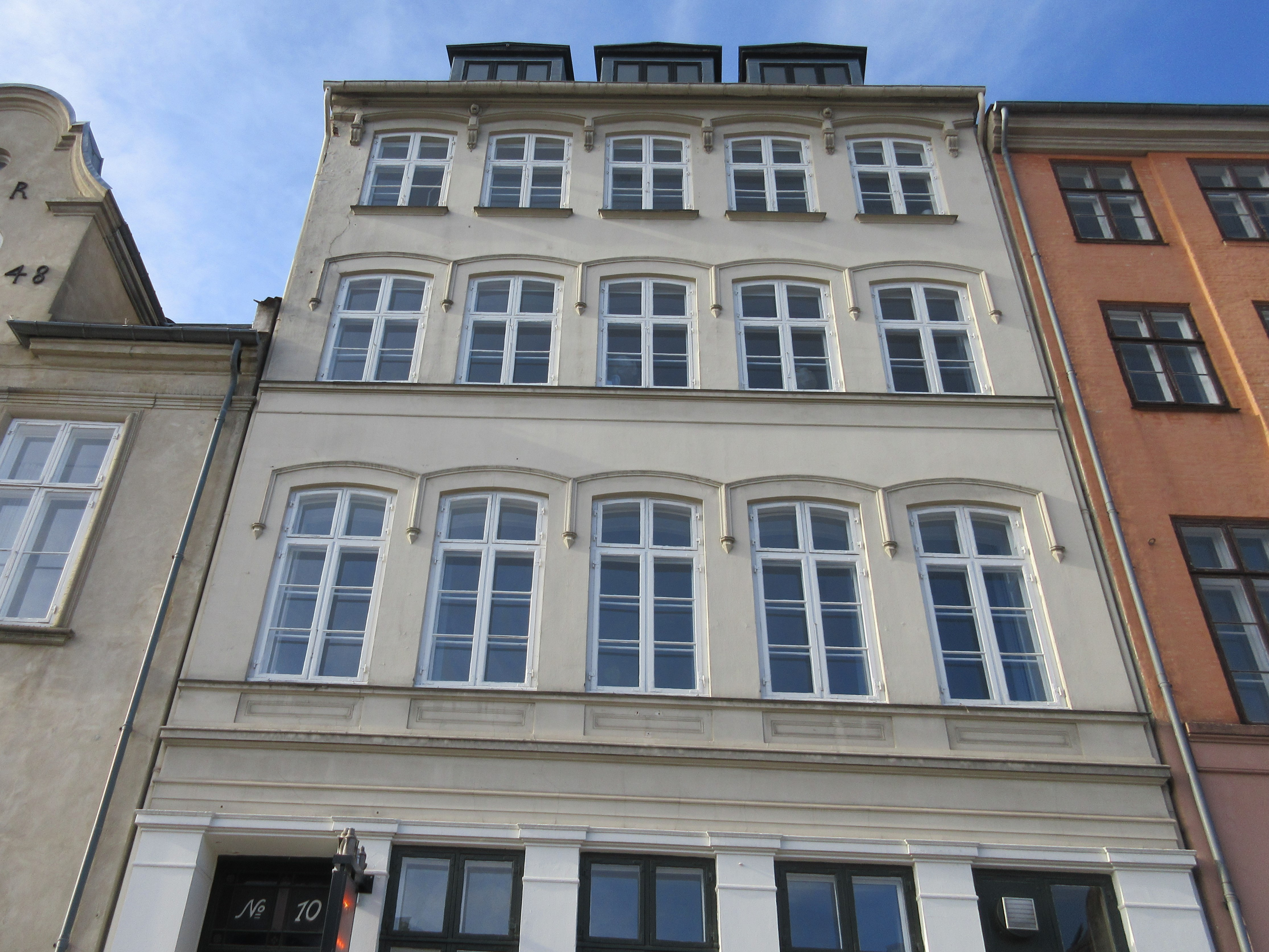
Nybrogade 10

== See also ==
- Krak House
