= Olav Werner =

Norwegian singer (1913–1992)

- Born: July 29, 1913; Geithus, Norway
- Died: March 10, 1992 (aged 78)
- Occupation: Singer

Olav Werner (July 29, 1913 – March 10, 1992) was a Norwegian singer and recording artist. He was a frequent soloist in the NRK programs Listener's Choice (Norwegian: Ønskekonserten) and Devotion (Norwegian: Andakten). He released a number of records and held many concerts, over 300 of which were with the organist Rolf Holger.

Werner was born in Geithus, Norway. He was a tenor/baritone, and he studied singing with Sigurd Hoff at the Oslo Conservatory of Music. Starting in 1937, he recorded over 800 singles and LPs. For several years he sang hits, and in 1945 he made his debut with church concerts. With NRK, Werner sang romantic songs and folk tunes. He also participated in some opera productions. For 19 years he was also a member of the Andaktskvartetten (Devotional Quartet). He sang in Arne Eggen's opera Cymbelin when it was performed at the National Theater in Oslo in 1951. He also gave concerts elsewhere in Scandinavia and in England and Germany.

On 7 June 2009, a memorial commemorating Olav Werner was unveiled in Geithus. Werner lived at Eiksmarka for most of his life. For many years, he owned and ran a funeral home in Oslo and Bærum.

== Discography ==
- "Det lyser i et vindu" (1938), debut recording
- "Under svaiende palmer" / "Mitt paradis" (Odeon), together with Eva Bereng and Guttorm Frølich's Hawaiiorkester
- "Kom til den hvitmalte kirke" (Emidisc)
- "Glade Jul" (Odeon), together with Sølvguttene
