= Rolf Holger =

Norwegian organist, pianist, and composer (1903–1969)

- Born: September 26, 1903; Kristiania (now Oslo), Norway
- Died: June 19, 1969 (aged 65)
- Occupations: Organist, pianist, and composer

Rolf Holger (September 26, 1903 – June 19, 1969) was a Norwegian organist, pianist, and composer.

== Career ==
Holger was born in Kristiania (now Oslo). He was the organist at Manglerud Church, but he is particularly known as the organist for NRK's radio devotionals, where together with Sigvart Fotland he played to hymns sung by the Andaktskvartetten (Devotional Quartet). Holger was also a sought-after accompanist, and he accompanied the singer Olav Werner at over 300 concerts throughout Norway. He also accompanied Aase Nordmo Løvberg on her concert tours. He was an accompanist on many recordings, including with Peder Alhaug. In 1950 he was a soloist at the premiere of Eivind Groven's Piano Concerto with the Bergen Philharmonic Orchestra, conducted by Olav Kielland. Rolf Holger was a Freemason and served as the organist at lodge meetings at the Freemasons' Hall (Norwegian: Stamhuset) in Oslo.

== Family ==
Holger was married to Sofie Almgren (1916–1989).

== Works ==
- Norske religiøse folketoner for en sangstemme med akkompagnement (1973)
- Å Jesus, store Gud, lyrics by Tore Ørjasæter
