= Immanuel Holger =

Intendant of Concepción Province
- In office 1958–1958
- President: Jorge Alessandri
- Preceded by: Alberto Carrasco García
- Succeeded by: Esteban Iturra Pacheco

Minister of the Interior
- In office 25 August 1948 – 27 February 1950
- President: Gabriel González Videla
- Preceded by: Jaime A. Quintana
- Succeeded by: Pedro Enrique Alfonso

Minister of the Interior
- In office 2 August 1947 – 7 July 1948
- President: Gabriel González Videla
- Preceded by: Luis Alberto Cuevas
- Succeeded by: Jaime A. Quintana

Undersecretary of the Navy
- In office 1937–1938
- President: Arturo Alessandri
- Preceded by: Guillermo Troncoso Palacios
- Succeeded by: Carlos Herrera Acevedo

Personal details
- Born: 1 June 1893 Valparaíso, Chile
- Died: 2 June 1963 (aged 70) Santiago, Chile
- Party: Independent

Immanuel Holger Torres (1 June 1893 – 2 June 1963) was a Chilean soldier and politician.

== Career ==
He served as Undersecretariat of the Chilean Navy between 1937 and 1938. During his tenure he passed the "cruise ship law".

Additionally, he served as minister of the Interior under the government of president Gabriel González Videla, in two terms: from August 2, 1947, to July 7, 1948, and from August 25, 1948, to February 27, 1950. He shut down the miners strikes in Lota in October 1947, declaring the provinces of Concepción and Arauco in a state of emergency. He was accused of a constitutional violation in November 1947, which was rejected by a wide majority in the Chamber of Deputies.

Later, he was head of the Naval Mission in Washington, D.C. (1950) and intendant of the province of Concepción (1958).
