= Thorvald Krak =

Danish road engineer

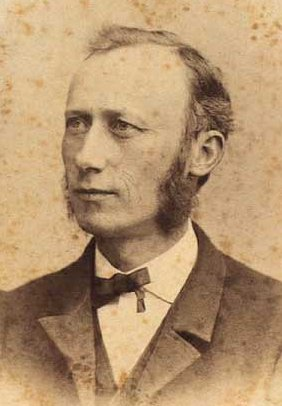
- Thorvald Krak in c. 1870
- Born: 12 June 1830; Copenhagen, Denmark
- Died: 16 November 1908 (aged 78); Copenhagen, Denmark
- Occupations: Industrialist, merchant, ship owner, ship builder
- Awards: Grand Cross of the Dannebrog

Elias Christian Thorvald Krak (12 June 1830 - 6 November 1908) was a Danish road engineer who headed the Department of Physical Planning (stadskonduktør) for 40 years in the City of Copenhagen and published the first City directory for Copenhagen.

== Early life ==
Krak was born in Copenhagen to navigator Hans Andersen Krak (1789–1844) and Karen Sophie Lind (1800–77). His last name comes from his ancestors farm Krakgård in Rutsker parish on the island of Bornholm. Thorvald Krak used the spelling "Krack" until 1890 as a result of an error in the church records. He went to school in Maribo and later received a military education in Copenhagen where he became a lieutenant in the engineering troops in 1850 and a senior lieutenant in 1853.

== Work for Copenhagen Municipality ==
In 1858, just 28 years old, he was appointed to stadskonduktør in Copenhagen and resigned from the army with status of captain. In 1859 he instigated systematic address numbering and in 1860–66 he surveyed all taxable properties in the city.

Krak resigned from his position as stadskonduktør in Copenhagen in 1898.

== Krak's City Directory ==
In 1862, Krak was awarded a license to publish a city directory for the Greater Copenhagen area. The work had been instigated by Hans Holck in 1770 but had only been sparsely updated for decades. He completely reorganized and modernized the publication with inspiration from foreign capitals before publishing his first city directory in 1863. In 1902 he passed the publication of Kraks Vejviser (Krak's Road Directory) on to his son Ove Krak, who was a physician.

== Personal life ==
Krak married Charlotte Henriette an. der Recke (27 November 1828 - 30 May1897) on 16 November 1858 in the Garrison Church in Copenhagen. She was the daughter of senior lieutenant and later Road Inspector Gengeal on Funen Peter Blankenborg Prydz van der Recke (1793–1847) and his wife Caroline Cecilie Petersen (1795–1868).

Krak is buried in the Garrison Cemetery in Copenhagen.

== See also ==
- Krak House
