= Manglerud Church =

Coordinates: 59°53′46.968″N 10°48′38.779″E

- Manglerud kirke
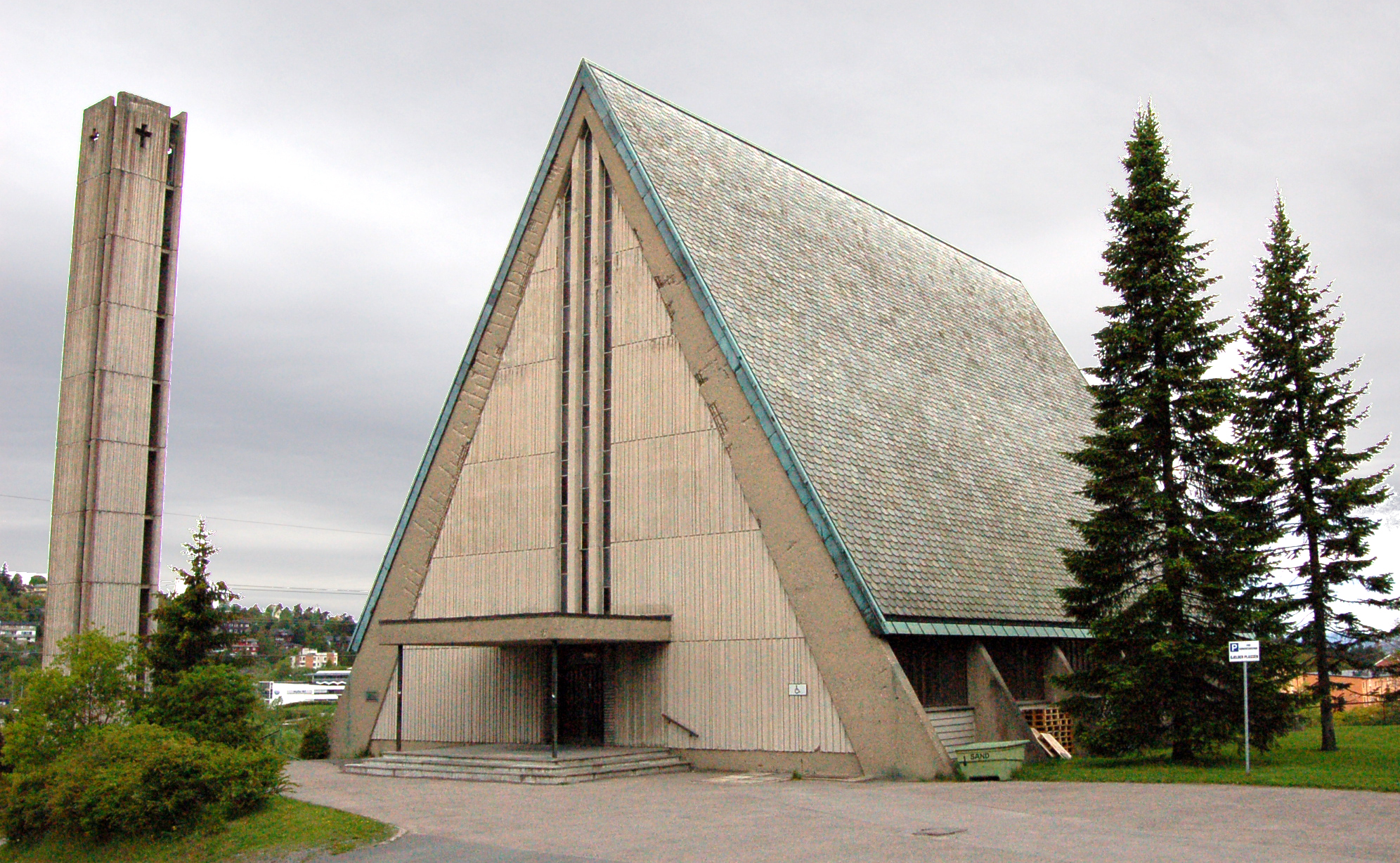

- Location within Oslo Location within Norway
- Location: Byggveien 10, Manglerud, Oslo,
- Country: Norway
- Denomination: Church of Norway
- Churchmanship: Evangelical Lutheran
- Website: kirken.no/manglerud

History
- Status: Parish church
- Consecrated: 1963

Architecture
- Functional status: Active
- Architect: Carl Corwin

Specifications
- Capacity: 600 seats

Administration
- Diocese: Diocese of Oslo
- Deanery: Søndre Aker
- Parish: Manglerud

Manglerud Church is a church in Oslo, Norway. The church was consecrated in December 1963. It is a parish church for Manglerud congregation. 400 seats, in addition to an adjacent church hall with 200 seats, as well as a smaller hall with 50 seats. There are also a small chapel, a baptismal sacristy and a youth activity room attached to the building. Manglerud Church is located above and on the south side of the E 6 highway and the subway at Ryen Station. It is easily visible with its high, steep ceilings and a slender, separate bell tower.

The 15 m high wall at the choir contains stained glass created by Sigurd Winge, it depicts "The Cross - from suffering to victory". In the choir hangs two knotted tapestries, created by Else Poulson. The pulpit and baptismal font are designed by drawings by architect Carl Corwin.

The church organ is a pipe organ with 32 voices. The three church bells are named "Joy," "Thank You," and "Prayer." They were cast at Olsen Nauen Bell Foundry and the weight are respectively. 240 kg, 480 kg and 850 kg. They have each engraved their own verse from 1 Thessalonians 5, 16-18: "Always be happy", "Pray forever" and "Thank you for everything".

Manglerud Church is listed by the Norwegian Directorate for Cultural Heritage.

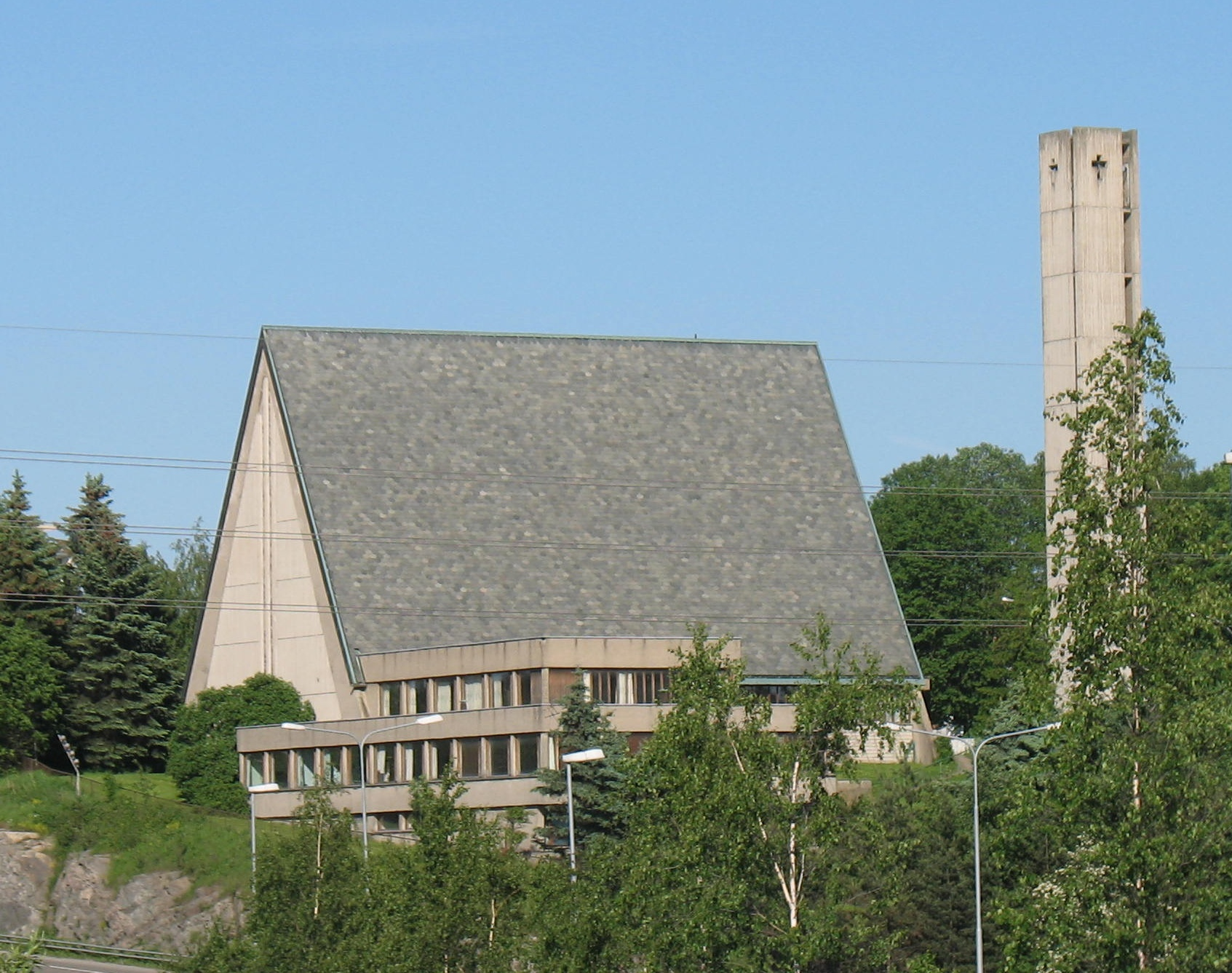
Manglerud Church, seen from Ryen Station
