= Holger Peter Sandhofe =

German typesetter and scholar (1972–2005)

Holger Peter Sandhofe (7 January 1972 – 24 May 2005) was a German typesetter and scholar of Gregorian chant.

Sandhofe studied music theory, medieval Latin, and history in Bonn. He mainly worked on producing musical editions for the older (pre-Vatican II) forms of the Roman Rite, and was involved in obtaining permission to hold services according to this form of the liturgy at the Alt-St.-Nikolaus church in Bonn. He also led a schola cantorum which sang the services according to the Germanic forms of chant in the manuscripts of Klosterneuburg. In 2002 he produced an edition of the Nocturnale Romanum containing all the chants for the observance of Matins according to the Roman Breviary throughout the year. Sandhofe drew on an "eclectic selection" of sources, writing some of the chants himself.

Sandhofe died on 24 May 2005 at the age of 33 following a long illness.
