= Alfonso Quintana =

Chilean lawyer (1891–1972)

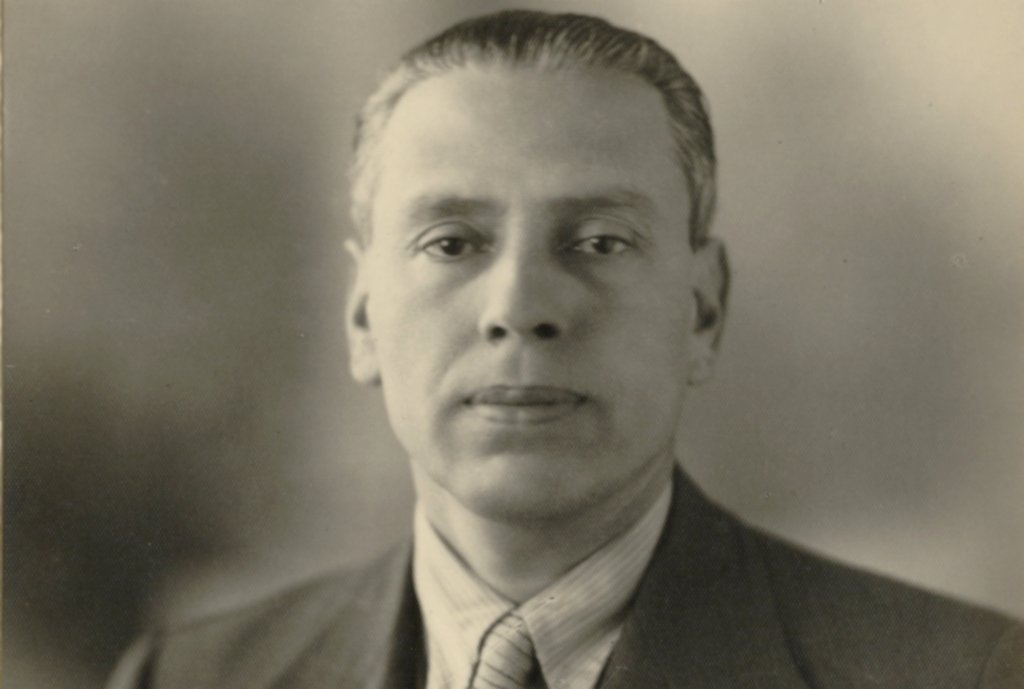
Jaime Alfonso Quintana

Jaime Alfonso Quintana Burgos (December 31, 1891 – August 27, 1972) was a Chilean lawyer, politician and diplomat.

== Biography ==
Born in the city of Chillán, Quintana studied at the Lyceum of his native city and later at the Instituto Nacional General José Miguel Carrera. He also later studied at the Faculty of Law at the University of Chile, where he was sworn in as a lawyer in 1918, having written his thesis on stock trades. He practiced in Chillán where he actively participated in the Assembly presiding Radical Chillán, with the arrival of Carlos Ibáñez del Campo to power, Quintana was banished to Aysen, finally returned after the fall of the dictatorship .

In 1923 in Yungay, had married Berta Bar Benavente had four daughters. On his return he was elected in 1933 as deputy for Chillán, Bulnes, and Yungay, economy integrate several commissions agricultural, which drew attention to Pedro Aguirre Cerda, who left it in the portfolio of Ministry of Agriculture of Chile, left office in 1941, had been alderman and Mayor of Chillán before.

In 1943 he was appointed to the same post by Juan Antonio Ríos, and October 6 of 1944 he took over as Minister of the Interior of Chile, after the failure of ministers Morales Beltrami, Hiriart, and Allard, all right-wing sector of the party, the weight Quintana was in vain as the CEN again hindered his work and was forced to resign in that position was Vice President for a few days, caused by a disease of Juan Antonio Ríos, then be replaced by Hernán Figueroa Anguita, who could not bear the office and was replaced by Luis Álamos Barros in 1945. He was appointed ambassador of Chile in Argentina in 1945, in 1948 returned to Chile and is reappointed Minister of the Interior of Chile by Gabriel González Videla, in 1950 he was appointed mayor of Santiago and 1951 to 1952 returns to the portfolio of the Interior, finally 1952 he was appointed deputy in the Ministry of Agriculture of Chile. He is honored with the Order of the Liberator Argentino rank of Grand Cross, belonging to a right-wing of the Radical Party of Chile, died militating in Radical Democracy.
