= Holger Lode =

German specialist for pediatrics (born 1967)

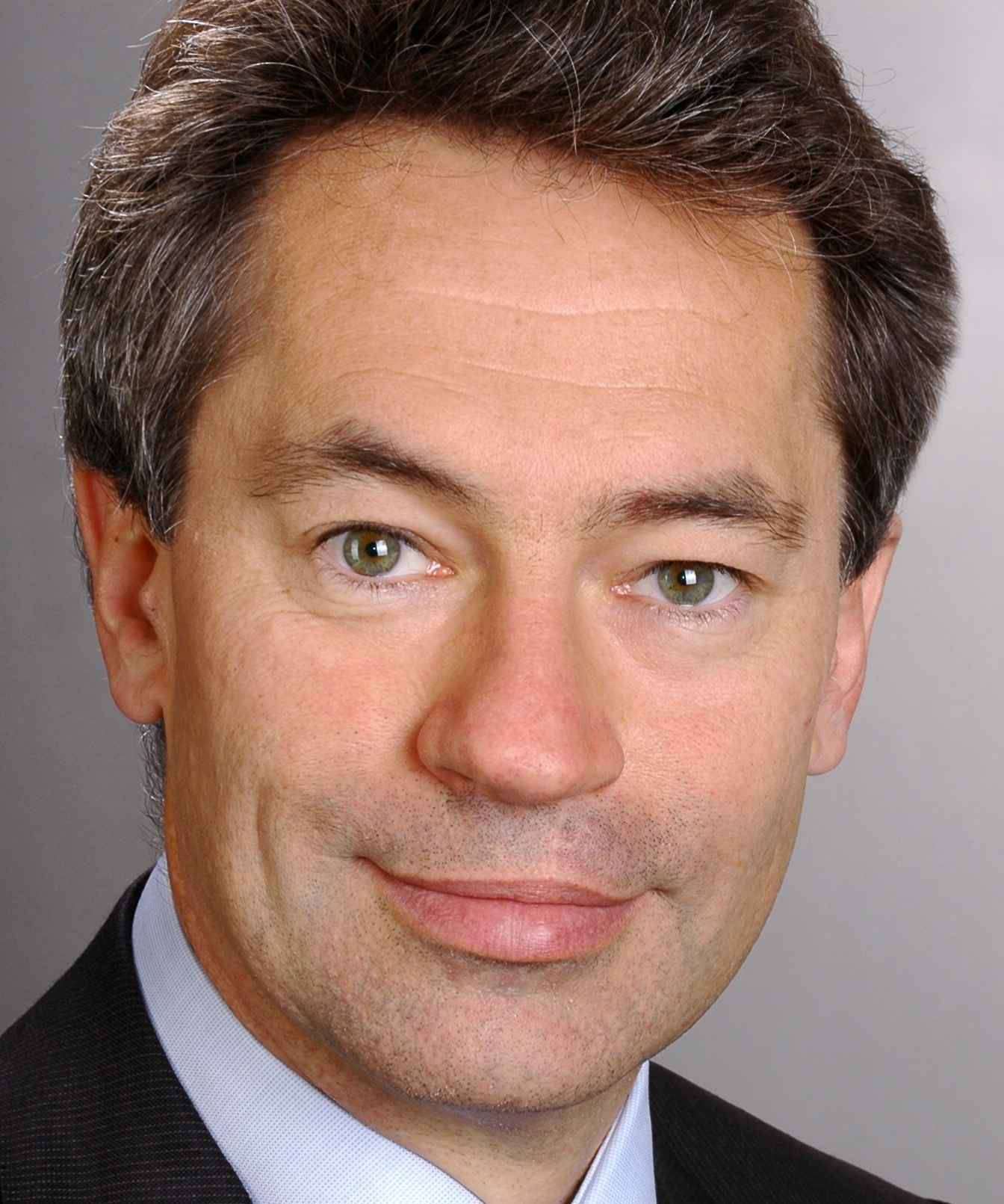
Holger Lode

Holger Lode (born 14 April 1967) is a German specialist for pediatrics. He is Professor and Chair of the Department of General Pediatrics and Pediatric Hematology and Oncology at the University Medicine Greifswald. He is also the director of the Center of Pediatrics and Adolescent Medicine in Greifswald. Lode is well known for his clinical and scientific work on immunotherapy of neuroblastoma.

== Biography and scientific contribution ==
Lode completed his undergraduate training in medicine at the University of Tübingen in 1992 and received his M.D. summa cum laude in 1993. He was awarded a research fellowship of the “Deutsche Forschungsgemeinschaft” in 1996, which he used for postdoctoral training at the Scripps Research Institute, La Jolla, CA in the area of tumor immunology. In 1999 he became a junior faculty member at Scripps, where he developed a tumor model to study immunotherapeutic approaches in a deadly malignancy in childhood called neuroblastoma. He demonstrated that treatment with immunocytokines, which are antibody-cytokine fusion proteins, is effective in this model and that this approach is synergistic with inhibition of angiogenesis as well as tumor vaccines. This seminal discovery was translated to clinical application and is subject to ongoing clinical trials (PM Sondel). In 2000 he continued training in Pediatrics at the Charité, University Medicine Berlin. At the same time he was awarded an “Emmy-Noether” Fellowship by the “Deutsche Forschungsgemeinschaft” with focus on immunotherapy approaches in neuroblastoma. In this time period, he developed novel approaches by means of genetic vaccination to treat malignant disease. In particular combinations of DNA vaccines with tumor specific delivery of immunocytokine lead to important step forward to optimize efficacy of DNA vaccination. In 2002 he became a member of the SIOPEN group and got involved in the clinical development of a monoclonal antibody directed against ganglioside GD2 (ch14.18/CHO). He investigated for the first time a novel delivery method of this antibody (patent) and he is currently leading two international clinical trials with this antibody.

== Awards ==
- 2005 Science4life, Venture Cup

== Memberships in scientific organizations ==
Lode is member of numerous German, European and American scientific organizations like the German Society for Children and Adolescent Medicine (DGKJ), the German Society of Pediatric Hematology and Oncology (GPOH), the International Society for Pediatric Oncology Europe Neuroblastoma (SIOPEN), the American Association for Cancer Research, the American Society of Hematology (ASH), the American Association of Immunologists (AAI) and the American Society of Clinical Oncology (ASCO). Since 2013 he is member of the SIOP Scientific Programme Advisory Committee (SPAC) of the International Society for Pediatric Oncology Europe Neuroblastoma (SIOP), chair of the Immunotherapy Committee and member of the executive Board of SIOPEN. Furthermore, Lode is contributing his expertise as a reviewer in the following scientific journals: The Journal of Immunology, Blood, Cancer Research, Cancer Gene Therapy, Clinical Cancer Research, Oncogene.

== Publications ==
- List of publications on research gate
