= Holger Pukk =

Estonian children's writer (1920–1997)

Holger Pukk (also Holger-Feliks Pukk; 14 August 1920 Tallinn – 12 March 1997 Tallinn) was an Estonian children's writer.

During the Second World War, he was a member of the Estonian Rifle Corps. From 1954 to 1974, he was chief editor for the children's magazines Pioneer and Täheke. From 1951 to 1990, he was a member of the CPSU.

== Works ==
- 1958: Seitseteist vaprat (Seventeen Brave Lads), collection of stories
- 1960: Rohelised maskid (Green Masks)
- 1970: Öine lahing (Night Battle), story
- 1974: Mida te teate Oskarist? (What Do You Know About Oskar?), story
