= Holger Stromberg =

German chef (born 1972)

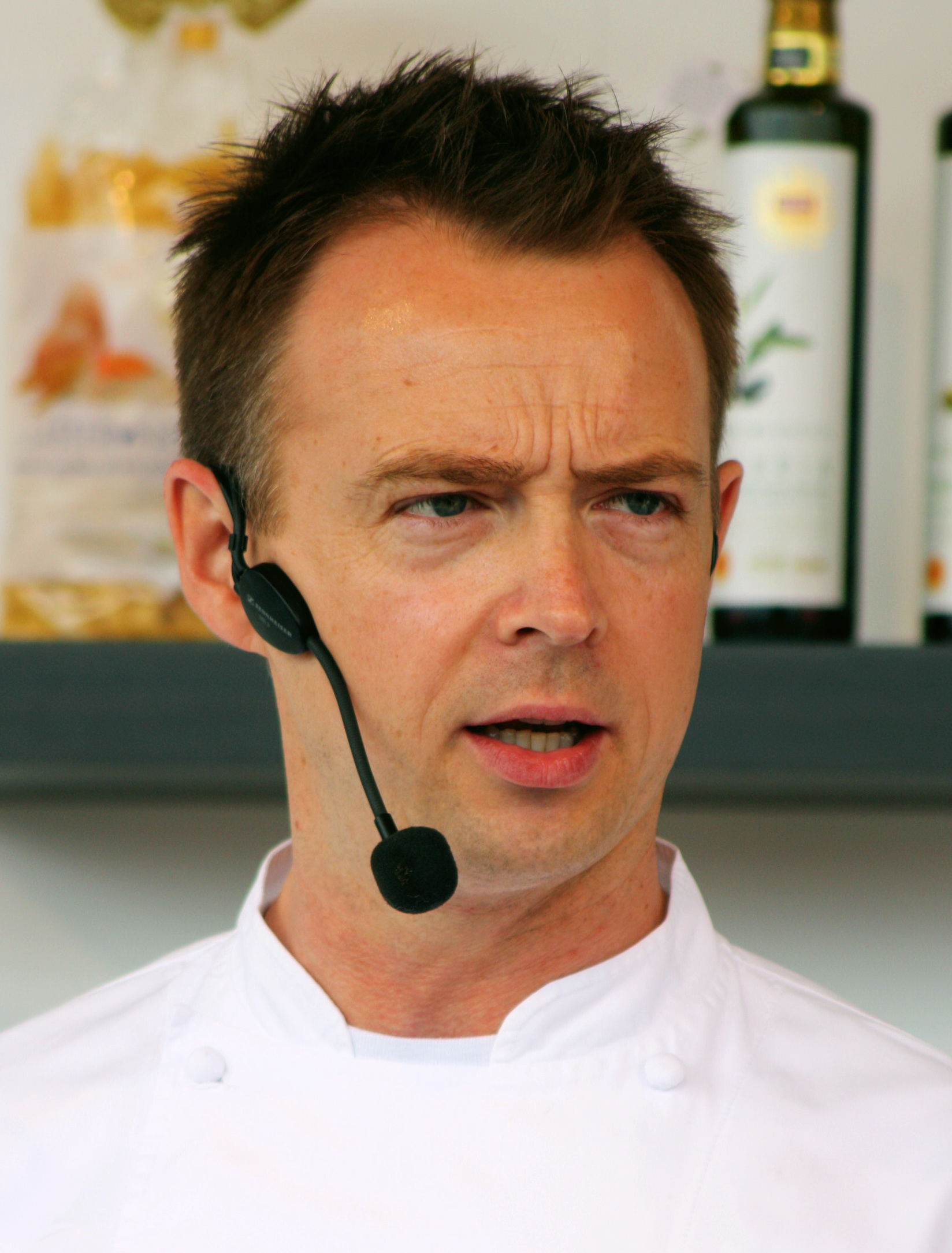
- Holger Stromberg in 2011
- Born: March 15, 1972 (age 54); Münster, North Rhine-Westphalia
- Culinary career
- Cooking style: German cuisine
- Rating: Michelin stars
- Current restaurants: Restaurant G; Gasthaus Stromberg
- Previous restaurants: Goldschmieding; Restaurant Mark’s
- Website: www.stromberg-live.de

Holger Stromberg (born 15 March 1972), is a German celebrity chef. At the age of 23 in 1994, he gained his first Michelin star whilst head chef at the restaurant Goldschmieding in Castrop-Rauxel, making him Germany's youngest Michelin starred chef. He is the owner and chef patron of Restaurant G in Munich, and the chef of the Germany national football team.

== Career ==
Stromberg trained at Zur Linde in Oberboihingen, Germany, moving afterwards to Schwarzer Adler and to Le Crocodile in Strasbourg. He became head chef at Goldschmieding in Castrop-Rauxel, where he was awarded his first Michelin star at the age of 23 in 1994, becoming the youngest chef in Germany to be awarded a star. He moved onto the Mandarin Oriental, Munich where he was head chef at Restaurant Mark’s until 2002.

In 2005 he opened his own restaurant, Restaurant G in Munich. During the same year, he also took over his parents' restaurant Gasthaus Stromberg in Waltrop. After the manager of the Germany national football team, Oliver Bierhoff, ate at Restaurant G in early 2007, Stromberg was asked to become the chef for the team. He accepted, and changed the way their pre-game menus were constructed to incorporate local ingredients for away games. Previously they had taken all the food for the team from Germany, but Stromberg changed this so that only the spices or herbs are transported. In constructing his menus he has also taken advice from the team's doctor, as one early creation of poppyseed dumplings could have resulted in the entire team testing positive for banned substances. Stromberg describes his style of cooking as "fancy", saying that he cooks what he wants to cook rather than following a particular trend.
