= Holger Ziegler =

German criminologist (born 1974)

Holger Ziegler (born December 15, 1974, in Jackson Heights, Queens, New York) is a professor of social work at the Faculty of Education at Bielefeld University. He was a member of the Research Training Group Youth Welfare and Social Services in Transition of the German Research Foundation (2000–2003), Fellow at the Department of Criminology at Keele University (UK) (2003), and an assistant professor of special education at Westfälische Wilhelms University Münster.

Since 2008, he has been a member of the North Rhine-Westphalia research school Education and Capability, and since 2010, a member of the academic advisory board of the German Soccer League. He is also a member of the Human Development and Capability Association (HDCA), and since 2010, has served as the speaker of the HDCA Thematic Group on Education.

== Academia ==
His main research fields are deviancy and social problems, research on social capital, impact research, inequality, and well-being.

== Research ==
- „Räumlichkeit und soziales Kapital in der Sozialen Arbeit – zur Governance des sozialen Raums“ [Spaciality and social capital in the field of social work – on the governance of social space] (DFG [German Research Foundation], 2003–2006)
- „Wirkungsevaluation von Maßnahmen in NRW und Schleswig-Holstein im Rahmen des Bundesprojekts „Frühe Hilfen für Eltern und Kinder und soziale Frühwarnsysteme“ [“Evaluation of the effects of the Federal project “Early aids for parents and children, and social early-warning systems” in North Rhine-Westphalia and Schleswig-Holstein” (since 2007)
- „Education as Welfare – Enhancing opportunities for socially vulnerable youth in Europe“ (EduWel, Marie-Curie ITN, since 2009)
- „Making Capabilities Work“ (WorkAble, collaborative research project within the 7th Framework Program of the European Commission, since 2009)

== Selected publications ==
- with S. Andresen, I. Diehm, and U. Sander, eds. 2010 (forthcoming). Children and the Good Life: New Challenges for Research on Children. Springer. Dordrecht.
- with H.-U. Otto, and A. Scherr 2010. Wieviel und welche Normativität benötigt die Soziale Arbeit? Befähigungsgerechtigkeit als Maßstab sozialarbeiterischer Kritik [How much and which normativeness does social work need? Fairness of competency as standard of social work criticism]. Neue Praxis (2): 137–163.
- with H.-U. Otto, eds. 2010. Education, Welfare and the Capabilities Approach – European Perspectives. Opladen & Farmington Hills: Barbara Budrich Publishers.
- with H.-U. Otto, and A. Polutta. 2009. Evidence-based Practice – Modernising the Knowledge Base of Social Work?. Opladen & Farmington Hills: Barbara Budrich Publishers.
- with N. Oelkers. 2009. Punitivität, Verantwortung und Soziale Arbeit [Punitivity, Responsibility, and Social Work]. Zeitschrift für Jugendkriminalrecht und Jugendhilfe (1): 38–44.
- with H.-U. Otto. 2008. The Notion of Causal Impact in Evidence-Based Social Work. Research on Social Work Practice 18(4): 273–277.
- with H.-U. Otto. 2007. Handlungsfähigkeiten und Verwirklichungschancen. Der Capability Approach als neue Orientierung in der Erziehungswissenschaft [Capacities to Act and Chances for Fulfillment. The Capability Approach as new Orientation in Educational Science]. Wiesbaden: VS Verlag.
- with F. Kessl, and C. Reutlinger. 2007. Erziehung zur Armut? Soziale Arbeit und die „neue Unterschicht“ [Educating into Poverty? Social Work and the „New Underclass“]. Wiesbaden: VS Verlag.
- 2006. Prävention und soziale Kontrolle [Prevention and Social Control]. In Soziologische Basics. Eine Einführung für Pädagogen und Pädagoginnen [Sociological Basics. An Introduction for Educationalists], ed. A. Scherr, 146–153. Wiesbaden: VS Verlag.
- 2005. Soziale Arbeit als Garant für ‚das Soziale’ in der Kontrolle? (Social Work as Guarantor for "the Social Aspect" in Control?). Kriminologisches Journal (2):162–183.
