= Holger Topp-Pedersen =

Danish landscape painter (1868–1938)

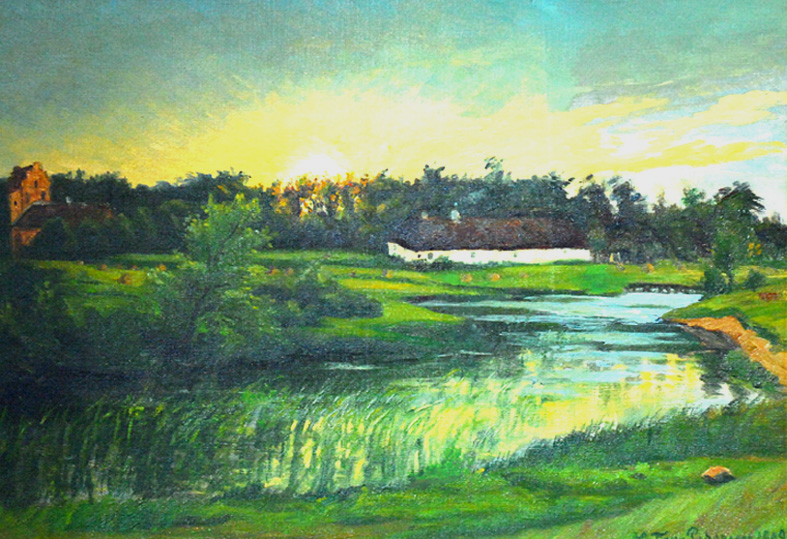

Holger Topp-Pedersen (13 October 1868 in Odense – 5 January 1938 in Odense) was a Danish landscape painter.

Holger Topp-Pedersen, son of Anders Christian Pedersen and Mariane Elise Topp, attended the technical school in his hometown. In 1884, he located to Copenhagen and studied at the Royal Danish Academy of Fine Arts from 1886 to 1891. Between 1896 and 1897, he travelled to New York and from 1897, he travelled frequently to Sweden.

From 1895 to 1935, he was an illustration teacher at the technical school in Odense. In 1901, he married Christine Samuelsen in Odense Rosa.

The artist made a name for himself as the creator of landscape paintings that almost always show typical Danish coastal and inland landscapes. He was influenced by naturalism and impressionism.
