= Martin Hammerich =

Danish art historian and politician

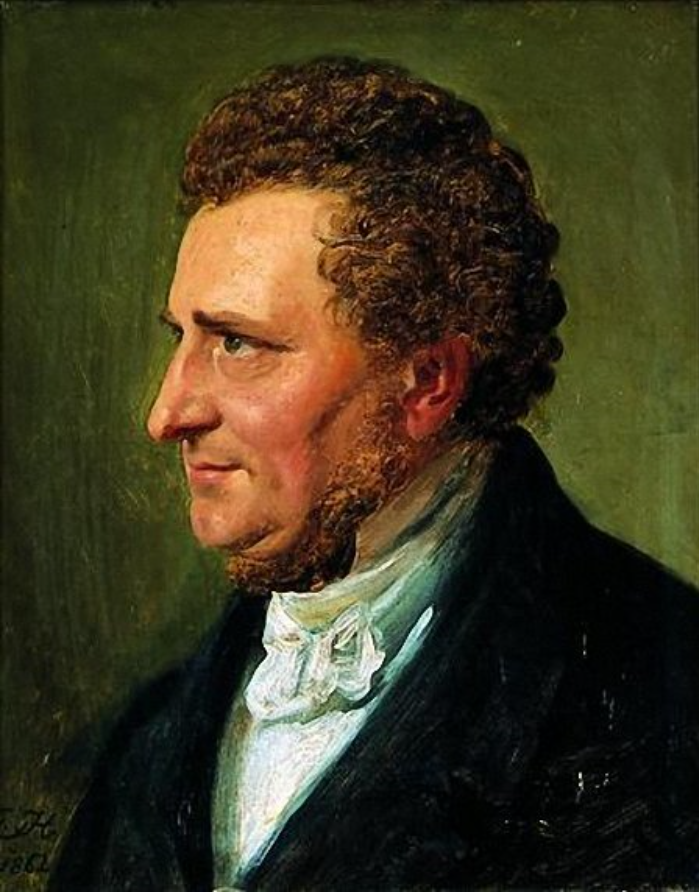
- Martin Hammerich by Jørgen Roed (1855)
- Born: 4 December 1811; Copenhagen, Denmark
- Died: 20 September 1881 (aged 69); Iselingen, Denmark
- Occupations: Scholar and educator

Martin Johannes Hammerich (4 December 1811 – 20 September 1881) was a Danish art historian, educator, author, and translator. He was part of the National Liberal movement and a member of the 1848 Danish Constituent Assembly. He was headmaster of Borgerdydskolerne from 1842 to 1867.

== Early life and education ==
Hammerich was born in Copenhagen, the son of merchant Johannes Hammerich (1777–1852) and Meta Magdalena Adolph (1777–1823). He was the brother of theologian and historian Frederik Hammerich (1809–1877) and the father of engineer Holger Hammerich (1845–1915).

He grew up in a wealthy home, graduating from Borgerdydskolerne in Christianshavn in 1828. He then enrolled at the University of Copenhagen where he won the 2nd prize for a paper on freedmen in Ancient Rome before graduating in theology in 1833. He obtained a master's degree in 1836 with a thesis on the Ragnarok myth and its role in Old Norse religion. It was the first thesis written in Danish at the university. He had pointed out the unreasonableness of treating a Nordic subject in Latin in an application and was granted a dispensation despite King Frederik VI's concerns.

== Travels and early academic career ==
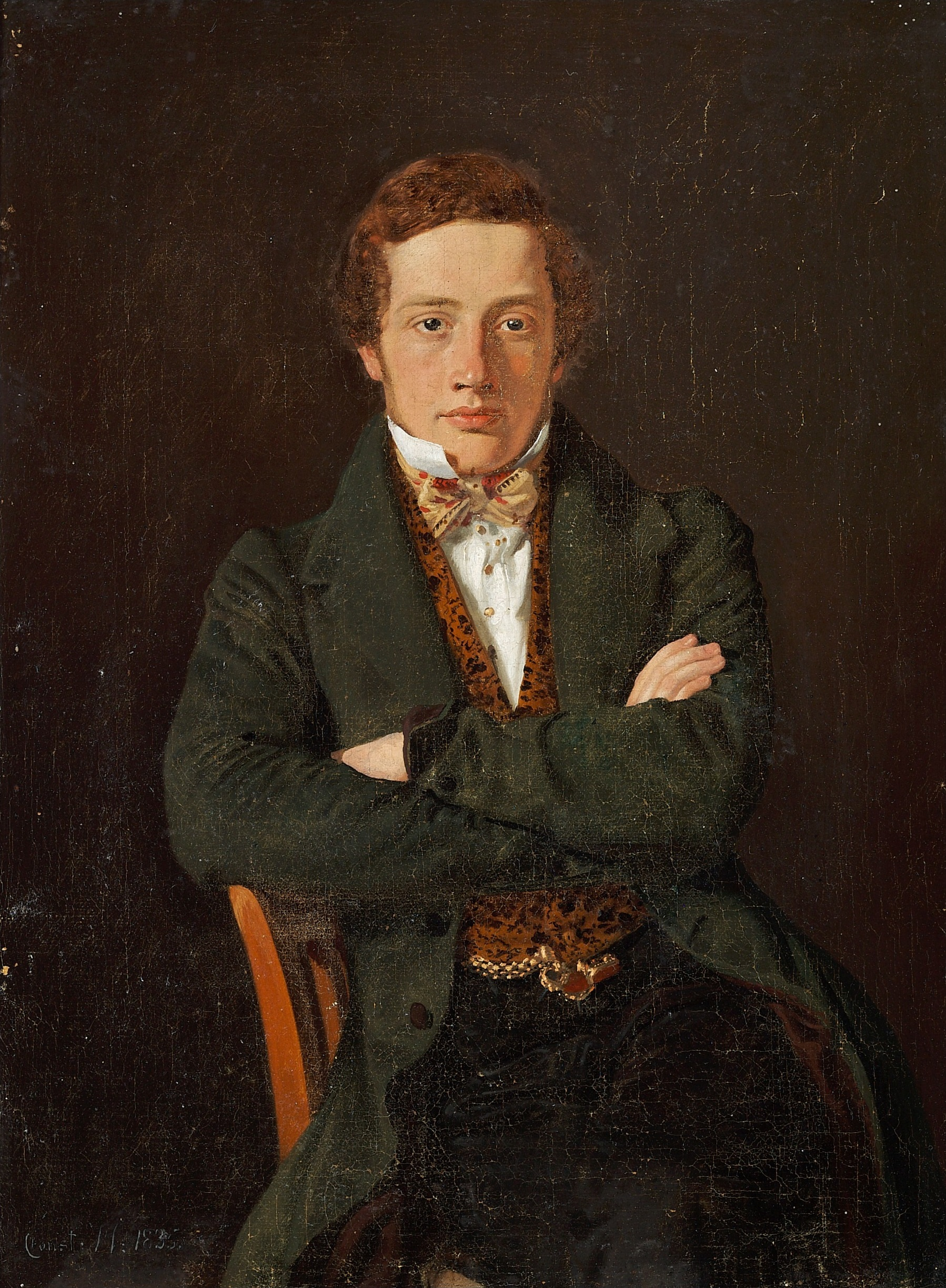
Martin Hammerich by Constantin Hansen in 1835

Hammerich's primary interests were philology and mythology, from Iceland to India. After his thesis, he went abroad to continue his studies. He initially traveled to the University of Bonn to study Sanskrit under professor August Wilhelm Schlegel (1767–1845) and later continued to Oxford University where he studied under English orientalist Horace Hayman Wilson (1786–1860). His next journey abroad, in 1838, took him to France, Italy, and Greece.

After his return to Denmark, he was a co-founder of the Liberal Student Society (Studentersamfund) alongside Carl Ploug (1813–1894), Andreas Frederik Krieger (1817–1893), Ditlev Gothard Monrad (1811–1887) and others, briefly serving as its chairman. It was already shot down by the university board (Consistorium) in 1840. From 1841–1844, he was employed as acting docent in Sanskrit at the University. His interest in Ancient Indian culture had been inspired by reading Sacontalá or The Fatal Ring as translated by Danish consul Hans West (1758-1811). In 1845, influenced by an improved version by Sanskrit scholar Otto von Böhtlingk (1815–1904), Hammerich published a Danish-language translation entitled Sacontala eller den uheldige Ring.

== Educator ==
After the death of Niels Bygum Krarup in 1842, Hammerich was appointed as the new headmaster of Borgerdydskolerne, his old school in Christianshavn. He stayed in the position for 25 years. As a member of a school commission and through numerous articles, he had a significant impact on Johan Nicolai Madvig (1804–1886) and the reorganization of the secondary school system in 1850.

== Politics ==
Danska och norska läsestycken

Hammerich was part of the Scandinavian movement. He was a co-founder of the Scandinavian Society (Skandinavisk selskab) in 1843 and the Nordic Literary History Society (Nordisk literatur-samfund in 1847 and Nordic University Journal (Nordisk Universitetstidskrift in Scandinavism) in 1854. He was a board member of the Swedish Letterstedtka Association (Letterstedtska föreningen) from 1876.

Hammerich was elected to Roskilde Provincial Assembly (Roskilde Stænderforsamling) and a member of the Danish Constituent Assembly elected in Copenhagen's 1st District.

== Publisher and writer ==
Hammerich and G. Rode published Aandelige Sjunge-Chor by Bishop Thomas Kingo (1634–1703). He also contributed to a book on Ludvig Holberg and wrote a small book on Danish and Norwegian literature as well as Evalds Levnet (1860), the biography of dramatist Johannes Ewald (1743–1781). He also wrote a book on the oeuvre of sculptor Bertel Thorvaldsen (1770–1844) posthumously published as Om Fremstillingens Kunst i Retning af det almeenlæselige (1881). His speeches, lectures and articles have been published in the five-volume Smaaskrifter om Cultur og Undervisning (1866–1882).

== Personal life ==
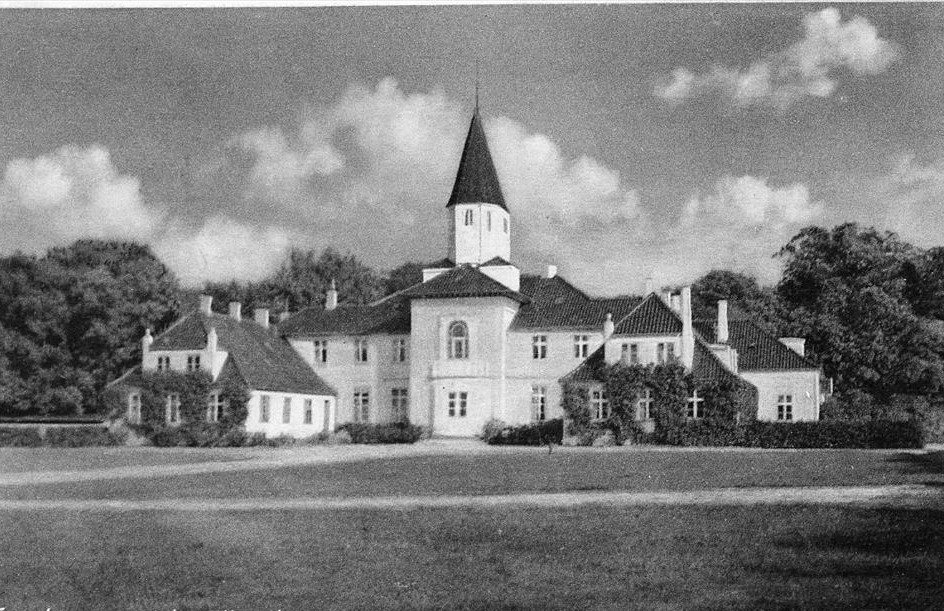
Iselingen at Vordingborg. ca 1950

Hammerich married Anna Mathea Aagaard (16 June 1820 – 28 February 1904), daughter of Holger Halling Aagaard (1785–1866) and Marie Koes (1790–1858) on 3 December 1841. The family lived at Wildersgade 5 in Christianshavn from 1844. He became a knight of the Order of the Dannebrog in 1856.

He inherited the estate Iselingen in Vordingborg from his father-in-law in 1867. He died on the estate on 20 September 1881. He is buried at Ørslev Cemetery. The headstone was designed by Thorvald Bindesbøll and features a portrait relief by Vilhelm Bissen.

== Selected works ==
- Om Ragnaroksmythen Og Dens Betydning I Den Oldnordiske Religion (Trykt hos J. D. Quist, 1836)
- Danska och norska läsestycken (Förlagt af Den Gyldendalske Boghandel, 1865)

== Other sources ==
- Jesper Brandt Andersen (2011) Martin Hammerich – kunst og dannelse i Guldalderen (Forlaget Vandkunsten) ISBN 978-87-7695-266-2
