= Holger Hammerich =

Danish engineer and politician (1845–1915)

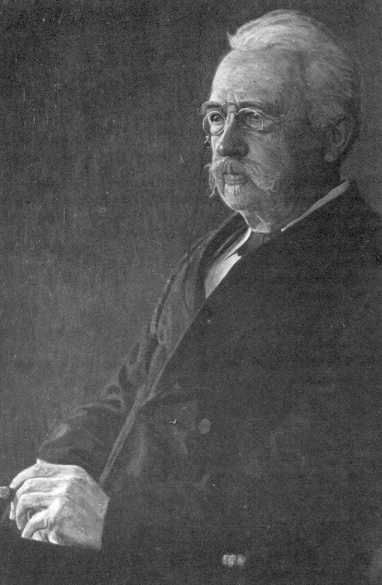
- Holger Hammerich
- Born: 20 November 1845; Copenhagen, Denmark
- Died: 4 October 1915 (aged 69); Copenhagen, Denmark
- Occupations: Engineer, politician
- Known for: Danish West India Company; Sophienholm
- Awards: Commander of the Dannebrog

Holger Aagaard Hammerich (20 November 1845 – 4 October 1915) was a Danish engineer and politician for the party Højre. He played a significant role in the foundation of the Freeport of Copenhagen in the 1890s as well as in the planning of rail lines and stations in Copenhagen. He was a member of the Danish Parliament from 1890 until his death in 1915 and represented his party in the negotiations leading up to the amendment of the Danish Constitution in 1915.

== Early life and career ==
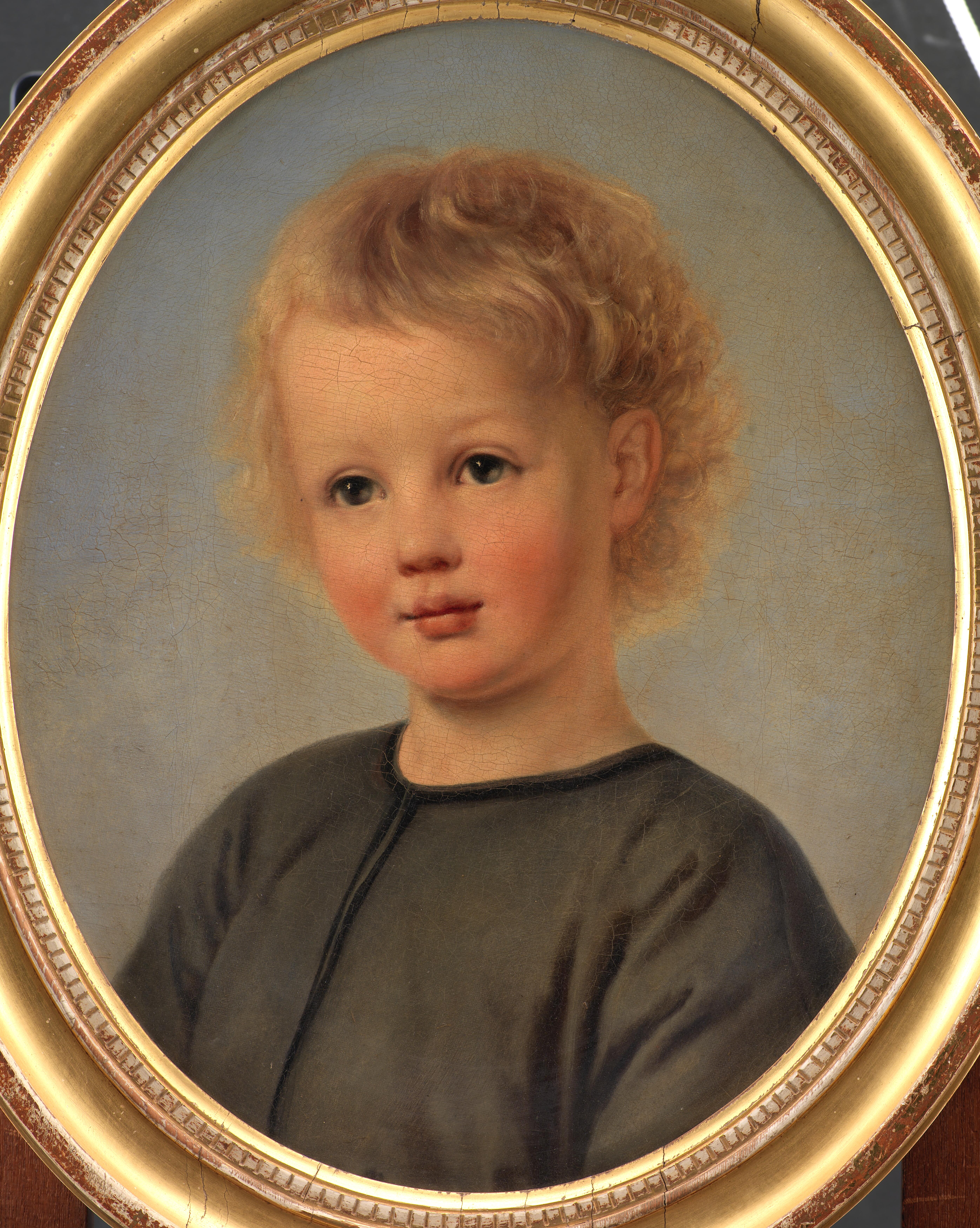
A four-year-old Holger Hammerich painted by Elisabeth Jerichau Baumann

Holger Hammerich was born in the Christianshavn neighbourhood of Copenhagen as the son of Martin Hammerich. He studied at the College of Advanced Technology from 1868 to 1871 but without completing his exams. In 1876 he travelled to America where he practiced until returning to Denmark in 1881 where he co-founded the machine factory Tuxen & Hammerich in Nakskov on the island of Lolland. On Lolland, he was also active in educating the local farmers about the potential in the cultivation of sugar beets, paving the way for the establishment of De Danske Sukkerfabrikker (lit. 'the Danish Sugar Factories'), whose construction projects he was involved in for some years.

In 1885 he made a proposal for a new arrangement of the railway network in Copenhagen which received considerable attention among politicians and in the media. His ideas were with certain modifications used by a commission which was established the following year. The establishment of the Boulevard Line was his proposal.

== Political career ==
In 1887 Hammerich was elected to the City Council in Copenhagen. In 1889 he was elected to the Folketinget, representing Nakskov, a mandate he kept until 1915. As a politician, Hammerich took a particular interest in issues of a technical nature and was a driving force behind the act which provided for the establishment of the Freeport of Copenhagen in 1891. He was also involved in the masterplanning of the complex and its surroundings in collaboration with H.C.V. Møller. The creation of the Langelinie Pier which both protected the new harbour basins and restored the recreational values of the area was his idea.

== Personal life and legacy ==
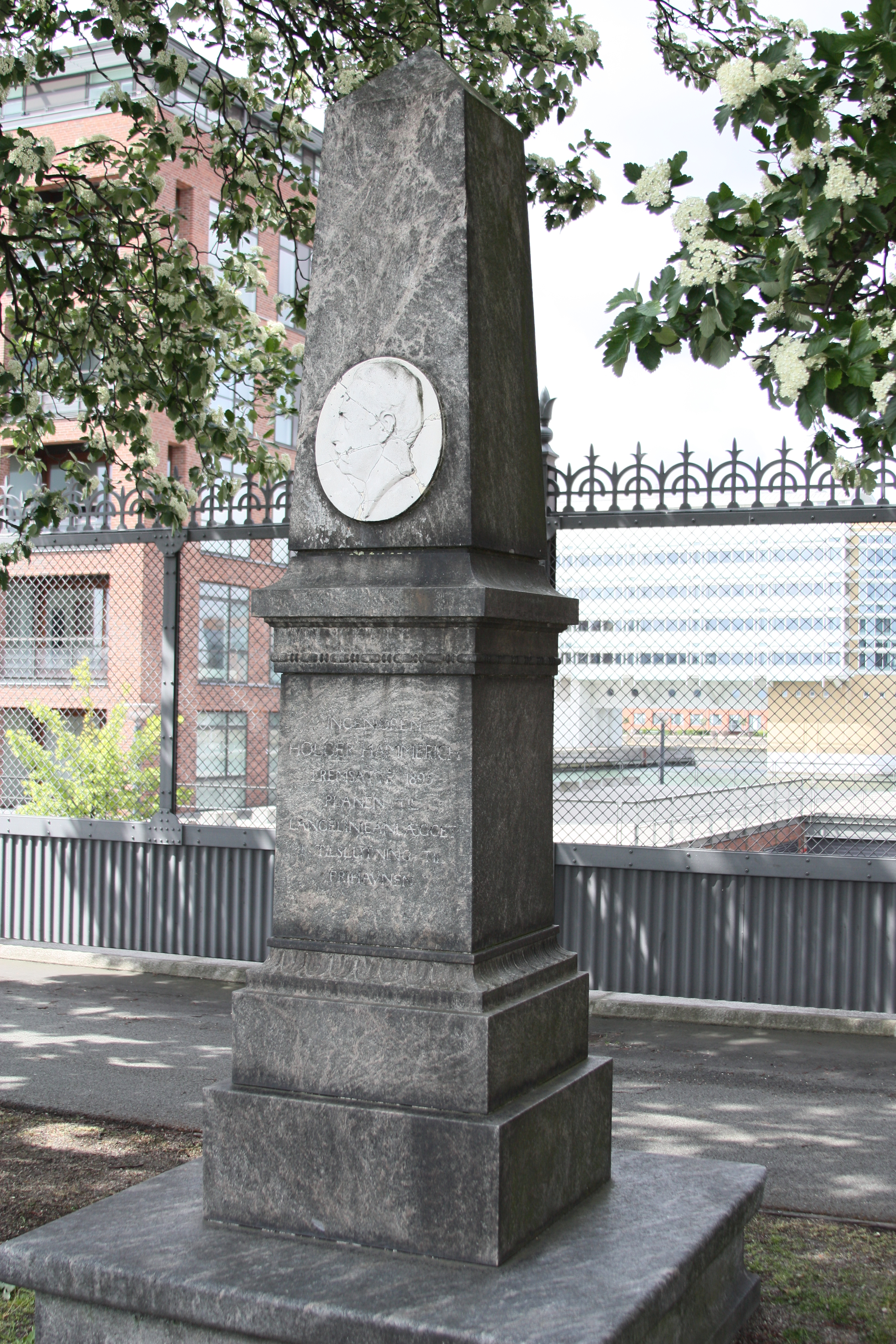
Holger Hammerich Memorial at Langelinie, Copenhagen

Hammerich married Pouline Christine Elisabeth Mølmark (4 December 1854 – 25 November 1927), a daughter of medical doctor Frederik Mørck (1811–1867) and Nielsine Caroline Hansen (1819–1858), on 12 November 1876 in Vordingborg. He was the father of Martin Hammerich (1883–1940).

Hammerich died on 4 October 1915 in Copenhagen and is buried in the city's Western Cemetery.

He is commemorated by a memorial at Langelinie in Copenhagen. The street Hammerichsgade is named after him.
