= Holger Schmieding =

German economist (born 1958)

Holger Schmieding (born 10 January 1958) is a German economist, the current Chief Economist at Berenberg Bank based at their London office (since 2010) and a frequent broadcaster and commentator on economic affairs in the media. Before joining Berenberg, he was a Senior Economic Advisor to the International Monetary Fund, a Senior Strategist at the Bank of America and worked for Merrill Lynch, based in Washington D.C., London and Frankfurt. The Financial Times Deutschland placed him at the top of the list of 50 analysts for the proven accuracy of his forecasts over the last six years in 2007. He worked as a journalist 1976–78 and studied economics in Munich, London and Kiel, obtaining a doctorate in economics at the University of Kiel with a dissertation on the integration of central and eastern European countries in the western European economy. He has also co-authored a book on German economic history since 1948, with Herbert Giersch and Karl-Heinz Paque.

== Publications ==
- “From Plan to Market: On the Nature of the Transformation Crisis,” Weltwirtschaftliches Archiv 129 (2), pp 216–253, doi:10.1007/BF02707696
- The Fading Miracle, by Herbert Giersch, Karl-Heinz Paque and Holger Schmieding, Cambridge University Press, 1992, ISBN 0-521-35351-3
- Lending Stability to Europe's Emerging Market Economies, On the Potential Importance of the EC and the ECU for Central and Eastern Europe, by Holger Schmieding, J.C.B. Mohr (publishing company), 1992, ISSN 0340-6989, ISBN 3-16-146035-9
